= 47 Meters Down (film series) =

Horror film series

- Official film series logo
- Starring: Mandy Moore; Claire Holt; Sophie Nélisse; Corinne Foxx; Brianne Tju; Sistine Stallone; John Corbett; Various actors (See below)
- Distributed by: Entertainment Studios Motion Pictures
- Country: United States
- Language: English

The 47 Meters Down film series consists of American-produced standalone survival natural-horror movies. The series includes two released theatrical movies, while a third feature film is in post-production. Based on characters created by Johannes Roberts and Ernest Riera, the plot of each installment follows a collection of characters who must work together in self-preservation to avoid being hunted by apex oceanic animals while taking part in different shark tourism activities.

Though the movies received mixed critical reception, they were each considered financial successes by turning a profit at the box office. The series has accumulated fans through the years since their release, earning a status of cult classics within their sub-genre of horror. Continued analyses from critics following their release, has given the movies ranking among the greatest shark movies of all-time by various sources. Such acclaim has been noted by a variety of sources which includes, but is not limited to: The Hollywood Reporter, IGN, Collider, Vulture, Entertainment Weekly, IndieWire, Comic Book Resources, Fangoria, Forbes, Screen Rant, Syfy, JoBlo, and Bloody Disgusting.

== Films ==
| Film | U.S. release date | Director | Screenwriter(s) | Producer(s) |
|---|---|---|---|---|
| 47 Meters Down | June 16, 2017 | Johannes Roberts | Johannes Roberts & Ernest Riera | James Harris and Mark Lane |
| 47 Meters Down: Uncaged | August 16, 2019 | Johannes Roberts | Johannes Roberts & Ernest Riera | James Harris, Mark Lane and Robert Jones |
| 47 Meters Down: The Wreck | TBA | Patrick Lussier | Johannes Roberts & Ernest Riera | James Harris, Mark Lane and Johannes Roberts |

=== 47 Meters Down (2017) ===
After experiencing a difficult breakup with her boyfriend, Lisa takes a vacation with her sister Kate to Mexico. On the trip the duo determine to create new memories, and to live adventurous experiences. When a flirtatious exchange with two single men provides them with an opportunity to see great whites in their oceanic environment through cage diving, Kate convinces Lisa to accept their offer.

Though the boat and its gear seem questionable, the pair convince the captain that they are experienced divers. Wearing advanced masks that allow them to communicate, they initially enjoy the opportunity of seeing apex predators in the wild. The two sisters are soon faced with a perilous fight for survival when the winch crane breaks, the shark-proof cage rapidly descends to the ocean flow 47 meters below the surface. Out of range to communicate with the boat's crew, Lisa and Kate work together to stay calm, and devise a plan for surviving the experience before they run out of oxygen. Further risks arise with potential hallucinations through nitrogen narcosis, the bends, limited visibility, and swarm of great white sharks on the hunt.

=== 47 Meters Down: Uncaged (2019) ===
Mia and Sasha are stepsisters, with the former becoming victim to bullying at school by Sasha's friends. Mia's father Grant is an experienced scuba diver who offers the girls an opportunity for bonding, by way of a boating trip to see great whites in the wild through one of his professional tours. On the first day of the trip, Mia is surprised that Sasha's friends who have been unkind are also onboard; including Catherine, Alexa, and Nicole. As they begin to overcome their differences, the group visits an isolated lagoon, which Alexa reveals to the group has an underwater secret entrance to a cave system that leads to a submerged ancient Mayan city. Explaining that her boyfriend works for Grant and that the location is being prepared for future study exhibition by archeologists, the group of girls determine to witness the locale for themselves.

With the help of their scuba gear, and the advanced masks that allow them to communicate under water, the friends begin their descent through the caves. Arriving in the ancient sacrificial chamber, Nicole is started by a cavefish and accidentally collides with a stone column. A chain reaction begins to occur with collapses surrounding them, and the girls become separated with visibility obstructed from the silt in the water. Realizing the entrance to the caves is now obstructed, the group of friends must work together to navigate 47 meters deeper into the ocean through the caves and the Mayan city before they run out of oxygen; all while surviving a number of blind great white sharks that have begun to hunt them through sound waves via a genetic mutation adaptation the animals have accumulated while living for years in the underwater labyrinth.

=== 47 Meters Down: The Wreck (TBA) ===
In February 2020, Roberts announced that a third 47 Meters Down movie was in early development. Stating that the next film is "definitely" happening and citing the second movie's financial successes, the filmmaker acknowledged that while he wouldn't be directing the project he is involved in its realization.

By May 2024, a third film was officially announced with the title 47 Meters Down: The Wreck. Directed by Patrick Lussier from a script co-authored by Johannes Roberts and Ernest Riera; the plot was stated to revolve around a father who strives to build a relationship with his estranged daughter, only for catastrophe to befall their deep sea dive to a shipwreck. James Harris, Mark Lane, and Johannes Roberts will serve as producers with the project intended to be a joint-venture production between Allen Media Group Motion Pictures, Tea Shop Productions, and FilmNation Entertainment. Principal photography is slated to commence in fall of 2024; while distribution rights will be purchased later that year at the Cannes Film Festival.

In February 2025, Roberts announced via his social media that principal photography had commenced. By May of the same year, Roberts revealed that the first cut of the movie had been completed. While in post-production, the cast was announced to co-star Ron Livingston, Sadie Stanley, and Bo Bragason; while Gary Beadle, and Pierre Bergman feature in supporting roles.

47 Meters Down: The Wreck was tentatively scheduled to release at an unspecified date in 2025; though this was later changed to an unspecified date.

== Main cast and characters ==
List indicators

This section includes characters who will appear or have appeared in the franchise in main roles.

- An empty grey cell indicates the character was not in the film, or that the character's official presence has not yet been confirmed.
- ^{C} indicates a cameo role.
- ^{V} indicates a voice-only role.

| Character | Films | | |
| Character | 47 Meters Down | 47 Meters Down: Uncaged | 47 Meters Down: The Wreck |
Principal cast
| Lisa | Mandy Moore (Note: Promotional materials featured Vanessa Kirby as the primary protagonist for the movie. Though the actress never appeared in the movie, she starred in a proof of concept short teaser trailer created by writer/director Roberts prior to being greenlit to use in pitching the project to studios.) | | |
| Kate | Claire Holt | | |
| Cpt. Taylor | Matthew Modine | | |
| Mia | | Sophie Nélisse | |
| Sasha | | Corinne Foxx | |
| Grant | | John Corbett | |
| Jennifer | | Nia Long | |
| Catherine | | Brec Bassinger | |
| Nicole | | Sistine Stallone | |
| Alexa | | Brianne Tju | |
| TBA | | | Ron Livingston |
| TBA | | | Sadie Stanley |
| TBA | | | Bo Bragason |
Supporting cast
| Louis | Yani Gellman | | |
| Benjamin | Santiago Segura | | |
| Javier | Chris J. Johnson | | |
| Ben | | Davi Santos | |
| Carl | | Khylin Rhambo | |

== Additional production and crew details ==
| Film | Crew/Detail | | | | | |
| Film | Composer(s) | Cinematographer | Editor | Production companies | Distributing companies | Running time |
|---|---|---|---|---|---|---|
| 47 Meters Down | Thomas Hajdu & Andy Milburn | Mark Silk | Martin Brinkler | Entertainment Studios Motion Pictures, Tea Shop Productions, The Fyzz Facility, Dimension Films, Altitude Film Entertainment, Dragon Root, Flexibon Films, Lantica Pictures | Altitude Film Distribution | 1 hr 25 mins |
| 47 Meters Down: Uncaged | Thomas Hajdu & Andy Milburn | Mark Silk | Martin Brinkler | Entertainment Studios Motion Pictures, Tea Shop Productions, The Fyzz Facility | Altitude Distribution, Entertainment Studios Motion Pictures | 1 hr 30 mins |
| 47 Meters Down: The Wreck | TBA | TBA | TBA | Allen Media Group Motion Pictures, Tea Shop Productions, FilmNation Entertainment | TBA | TBA |

== Reception ==
=== Box office and financial performance ===
| Film | Box office gross | | | Box office ranking | | Total home video sales | Worldwide total gross income | Budget | Worldwide total net income | Ref. |
| Film | North America | Other territories | Worldwide | All-time North America | All-time international | Total home video sales | Worldwide total gross income | Budget | Worldwide total net income | Ref. |
|---|---|---|---|---|---|---|---|---|---|---|
| 47 Meters Down | $44,307,193 | $18,326,512 | $62,633,705 | #2,163 | #3,867 | $3,407,286 | $66,040,991 | $5,300,000 | $60,740,991 | |
| 47 Meters Down: Uncaged | $22,260,900 | $25,321,663 | $47,582,563 | #3,672 | #3,254 | $1,392,007 | $48,974,570 | $12,000,000 | $36,974,570 | |
| 47 Meters Down: The Wreck | | | | | | | | TBA | | —N/a |

=== Critical and public response ===
| Film | Rotten Tomatoes | Metacritic | CinemaScore |
|---|---|---|---|
| 47 Meters Down | 53% (157 reviews) | 52/100 (24 reviews) | C |
| 47 Meters Down: Uncaged | 44% (88 reviews) | 43/100 (17 reviews) | C+ |
| 47 Meters Down: The Wreck | | | |
