= Tea Shop Productions =

Film production company based in London

- Formerly: The Tea Shop & Film Company
- Industry: Film production
- Founded: 2010; 16 years ago
- Founder: James Harris; Mark Lane
- Headquarters: London
- Key people: Leonora Darby (producer)
- Products: Motion pictures
- Website: www.teashopfilm.com

Tea Shop Productions, also known as Tea Shop (formerly The Tea Shop & Film Company), is a film production company based in London. It was co-founded in 2010 by producers James Harris and Mark Lane, who now run the company with producer Leonora Darby.

One of Tea Shop Productions' goals is to elevate undiscovered directors. The company has helped filmmakers like James Nunn, Ronnie Thompson, Jeffrey Darling, and Keir O'Donnell by producing their directorial debuts. Some of Tea Shop's other notable projects include 47 Meters Down (2017), Fall (2022), The Surfer (2024), and Curry Barker's Obsession (2025), the company's highest-grossing film.

== History ==
James Harris and Mark Lane were university roommates at the Surrey Institute of Art & Design in the 2000s. After graduating, the two lived together in London, with Harris working on low-budget independent films and Lane starting in film sales, working for UK film industry veteran Simon Crowe of SC Films International. Around 2009, Harris asked Lane to help produce and sell a few films he was developing. These included Tower Block (2012) and Cockney vs. Zombies (2012). Lane left his day job to work with Harris full time.

In 2016, it was reported that UK film financing company The Fyzz Facility had formed a strategic partnership with Tea Shop Productions (then The Tea Shop & Film Company) to launch The Fyzz Facility Pictures. They had already collaborated on three films together. Harris and Lane were appointed as directors of the company, alongside Fyzz's producers Wayne Marc Godfrey and Robert Jones. Harris and Lane would exit the Fyzz partnership in 2019 and relaunch Tea Shop Productions with film financier Head Gear Films.

The 2017 survival horror film 47 Meters Down marked the first time Harris and Lane helped fund a movie, investing $8,000 in the project. The film would make over $62 million world wide. Two years later, the sequel 47 Meters Down: Uncaged (2019) would make more than $47.5 million worldwide on a $12 million budget. In 2024, a third film, 47 Meters Down: The Wreck, was green lit.

Tea Shop Productions' next big film was Fall (2022), a survival/psychological thriller that made $21 million worldwide on a $3 million budget. As part of the film's production, Tea Shop created a 20-foot tower on a 100-foot hill to help provide false perspective. In February 2026, Fall was No. 2 on Netflix's Top 10 streaming chart in the U.S. In May 2024, it was announced that a sequel, Fall 2: Deadpoint, had been green lit by Lionsgate, with the Spierig Brothers set to direct.

In 2023, Harris contacted filmmaker and YouTuber Curry Barker about turning his short film The Chair into a feature. Barker instead pitched Obsession (2025), a supernatural horror film that would go on to premiere at the Toronto International Film Festival (TIFF), be picked up by Focus Features for $15 million, and make over $459 million worldwide. Obsession is the company's highest grossing film.

In May 2023, it was reported that film tech company and generative AI firm Flawless, which was co-founded by Fall director Scott Mann, was partnering with XYZ Films and Tea Shop Productions to acquire rights to foreign-language films and convert them into English for distribution. In September of that year, Tea Shop, along with Flawless and XYZ Films, acquired the rights to Ryoo Seung-wan's crime film, Smugglers (2023), ahead of its Gala Premiere at the TIFF.

In April 2024,The Surfer, an Australian psychological thriller starring Nicolas Cage, received a six-minute standing ovation after its Midnight Screening premiere at the Cannes Film Festival. Lionsgate and Roadside Attractions would acquire distribution rights for North America in July.

In May 2024, Tea Shop Productions signed a production venture with Flawless, for a $100 million fund, to produce and fully finance up to 10 commercial genre films.

As of 2026, the company employed five people, including Leonora Darby, who first joined Tea Shop Productions as an assistant but was quickly promoted to producer. Darby has described the essence of a Tea Shop project as "bold, commercial, authored genre".

== Filmography ==
=== Feature films ===
Year	Title	Director(s)	Distributor(s)	Ref.
2012	Tower Block	James Nunn, Ronnie Thompson (directorial debuts)	Lionsgate UK (UK), Shout! Factory (US), and others (international)	
2013	Cockney vs. Zombies	Matthias Hoene	StudioCanal	
2013	Green Street 3: Never Back Down	James Nunn	Lionsgate Home Entertainment	
2014	The Anomaly	Noel Clarke	Universal Pictures	
2014	I Am Soldier	Ronnie Thompson	SC Films International, Lionsgate UK	
2016	I Am Not a Serial Killer	Billy O'Brien	IFC Midnight	
2016	Eliminators	James Nunn	Universal Pictures	
2017	47 Meters Down	Johannes Roberts	Entertainment Studios (US), Entertainment One (UK)	
2017	Revolt	Joe Miale	Vertical Entertainment	
2017	Romans/Retaliation*	Ludwig Shammasian, Paul Shammasian	Saban Films	
2017	Slumber	Jonathan Hopkins	Vertical Entertainment	
2019	47 Meters Down: Uncaged	Johannes Roberts	Entertainment Studios (US), Altitude Film Distribution (UK)	
2021	Wrong Turn	Mike P. Nelson	Saban Films	
2021	A Banquet	Ruth Paxton	IFC Midnight	
2021	Bull	Paul Andrew Williams	Signature Entertainment	
2022	Fall	Scott Mann	Lionsgate (US), Signature Entertainment (UK)	
2022	Into the Deep	Kate Cox	Lionsgate	
2022	Gatlopp: Hell of a Game	Alberto Belli	XYZ Films	
2022	Bar Fight!	Jim Mahoney	IFC Films	
2023	Little Bone Lodge/The Last Exit	Matthias Hoene	SC Films International	
2023	All Souls	Emmanuelle Pickett	Lionsgate Home Entertainment	
2024	The Surfer	Lorcan Finnegan	Vertigo (UK, Ireland), Madman Films (Australia), Roadside Attractions and Lionsgate (US)	
2024	He Went That Way	Jeffrey Darling (directorial debut)	Vertical Entertainment	
2024	Marmalade	Keir O'Donnell (directorial debut)	Signature Entertainment	
2024	The Wasp	Guillem Morales	Shout! Studios (US), Universal (UK)	
2024	The Cut	Sean Ellis		
2025	Tornado	John Maclean	Lionsgate UK, IFC Films and Shudder (North America)	
2025	Giant	Rowan Athale	Vertical (US), True Brit Entertainment (UK)	
2025	The Bayou	Taneli Mustonen, Brad Watson	Vertical Entertainment	
2025	Abraham's Boys	Natasha Kermani	RLJE Films, Shudder	
2025	Obsession	Curry Barker	Focus Features (US), Universal Pictures (some international)	
2026	Fall 2: Deadpoint	Peter and Michael Spierig	Lionsgate	

*Note: Romans premiered at the 2017 Edinburgh International Film Festival. It was released in the US in 2020 under the title Retaliation.

=== Short films ===
Year	Title	Director(s)	Notes	Ref.
2020	The Plague	Johannes Roberts	Proof-of-concept short film	
2023	Everybody Dies... Sometimes	Charlotte Hamblin	Won awards at the Kino London Short Film Festival, premiered at the Tribeca Film Festival	

=== Upcoming films ===
Title	Director(s)	Ref
The Cycle	Jordan Downey	
47 Meters Down: The Wreck	Patrick Lussier	
The Red Triangle	Johannes Roberts	
The Broodmare	Anna Zlokovic	
Boutique	Jim Gavin	
Feature based on Julia Armfield's short story Manti	TBA	
