= Conrad Goode =

American football player (born 1962)

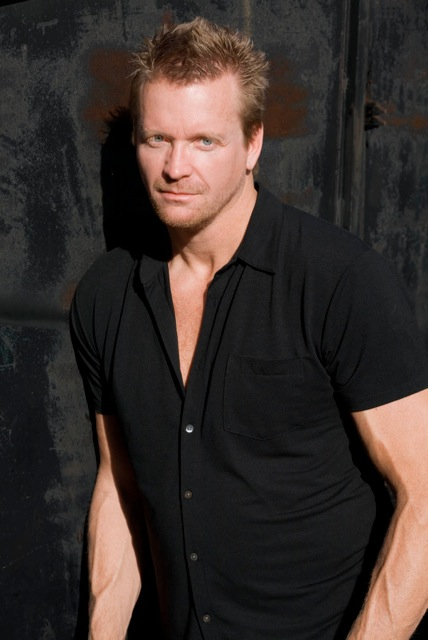
- Goode in 2012
- Born: Conrad Lawrence Goode; January 9, 1962 (age 64); Columbia, Missouri, U.S.
- Occupations: actor, screenwriter, film producer, musician, artist, poet
- Years active: 1987–present
- Football career

No. 62, 79
- Position: Offensive lineman

Personal information
- Listed height: 6 ft 6 in (1.98 m)

Career information
- High school: Parkway Central (Chesterfield, Missouri)
- College: Missouri
- NFL draft: 1984: 4th round, 87th overall pick

Career history
- New York Giants (1984–1985); Tampa Bay Buccaneers (1987)

Awards and highlights
- First-team All-American (1983); First-team All-Big Eight (1983); 2× Second-team All-Big Eight (1981, 1982)

Career NFL statistics
- Games played: 45
- Games started: 4
- Stats at Pro Football Reference
- Website: http://www.conradgoode.com

Conrad Lawrence Goode (born January 9, 1962) is an American actor, screenwriter, film producer, musician, artist and former professional football player. He played as an offensive lineman in the National Football League (NFL). He played college football for the Missouri Tigers, earning first-team All-American honors in 1983.

== Early life and education ==
Goode was born in Columbia, Missouri, and attended Parkway Central High School. He is the stepson of Irv Goode and the son of former Mizzou All-American Conrad Hitchler. He played college football at the University of Missouri and was named a first-team All-American in 1983 by the United Press.

== Career ==
Goode was selected in the fourth round of the 1984 NFL draft by the New York Giants. He played two seasons with the Giants and one with the Tampa Bay Buccaneers, appearing in 35 games and starting in four of them. His acting debut was with Joe Piscopo in a Miller Lite commercial in 1986. In 1987, he moved into television with an appearance on Saturday Night Live and The Adventures of Superboy.

In 1990, he moved to Los Angeles. Over the next thirty-two years he appeared in commercials, motion pictures and television. He is a published poet and is also a composer. He produced his first feature film, Watercolor Postcards. Goode has appeared in more than thirty films, including Paul Blart: Mall Cop 2, Don't Say A Word, Con Air, Anger Management, Me, Myself and Irene and The Longest Yard. He has appeared in 40 national commercials and a dozen television shows. He most recently wrote, produced and starred along with Laura Bell Bundy and Bailee Madison in the film Watercolor Postcards in 2014.

== Filmography ==
=== Film ===
Year	Title	Role	Notes
1995	Sex and the Other Man	John	
1996	Bulletproof	Biker	
1997	Beverly Hills Ninja	Bouncer	
1997	Con Air	Viking	
1998	Dirty Work	John	Uncredited
1998	Ringmaster	Sexy Male Neighbor	
1999	Made Men	Jessop	
2000	Me, Myself & Irene	Softball Player	
2000	Desperate but Not Serious	Security Guard	
2001	Tomcats	Repo Man	
2001	Don't Say a Word	Max	
2002	Highway	Gibby	
2002	The New Guy	Billy Ray	
2003	Anger Management	Bailiff / Lexus Man	
2003	Sunset Stripper Murdrs	Willis	
2005	The Longest Yard	Guard Webster	
2013	Straight A's	Craps Table Player #1	
2013	Watercolor Postcards	Butch	Also producer and writer
2014	Looking for Lions	Kevin Fitzpatrick	
2015	Accidental Love	The Father	Uncredited
2015	Paul Blart: Mall Cop 2	Scott	
2019	After She Wakes	Intruder	

=== Television ===
Year	Title	Role	Notes
1988	Saturday Night Live	Big Red	Episode: "Danny DeVito/The Bangles"
1990	Superboy	Bouncer	Episode: "Johnny Casanova and the Case of Secret Serum"
1991	Hi Honey, I'm Home!	Ron	Episode: "Make My Bed"
1993	Lois & Clark	Hans	Episode: "Pheromone, My Lovely"
1994	The Mommies	Gunnar	Episode: "Five Minutes Apart"
1994	New Eden	Golyat	Television film
1996	Circuit Breaker	Group Leader	Television film
1999	Justice	Biker	Television film
2001	Going to California	Titus	Episode: "The Naked and the Nude"
2002	Cedric the Entertainer: Starting Lineup	Slave	Television film
2003	Blitt Happens	Security Guard	Television film
2006	One Tree Hill	Bear	4 episodes
