= 47 Meters Down: The Wreck =

Upcoming film by Patrick Lussier

- Directed by: Patrick Lussier
- Written by: Johannes Roberts; Ernest Riera
- Produced by: James Harris; Mark Lane; Johannes Roberts
- Starring: Ron Livingston; Bo Bragason; Sadie Stanley; Gary Beadle; Pierre Bergman
- Cinematography: Mark Silk
- Edited by: Tommy Aagaard
- Music by: Michael Wandmacher
- Production companies: Allen Media Group; Tea Shop Productions
- Distributed by: Lionsgate
- Country: United States
- Language: English

47 Meters Down: The Wreck is an upcoming survival horror film written by Johannes Roberts and Ernest Riera, and directed by Patrick Lussier. The latest entry in the 47 Meters Down franchise, it is a standalone sequel to 47 Meters Down: Uncaged (2019). The film is about a father who strives to build a relationship with his estranged daughter, only for catastrophe to befall their deep sea dive to a shipwreck. In February 2026 Roberts said he thought it would be out sometime this year, released by Lionsgate, with a 4th movie to follow after.

== Cast ==
- Ron Livingston
- Bo Bragason
- Sadie Stanley
- Gary Beadle
- Pierre Bergman

== Production ==
In February 2020, Roberts announced that a third 47 Meters Down movie was in early development, and while he wouldn't be directing the project he would be involved. By May 2024, a third film was officially announced with the title 47 Meters Down: The Wreck. Directed by Patrick Lussier from a script co-authored by Johannes Roberts and Ernest Riera; the plot was stated to revolve around a father who strives to build a relationship with his estranged daughter, only for catastrophe to befall their deep sea dive to a shipwreck. James Harris, Mark Lane, and Johannes Roberts will serve as producers with the project intended to be a joint-venture production between Allen Media Group Motion Pictures, Tea Shop Productions, and FilmNation Entertainment.

In February 2025, Roberts announced via his social media that principal photography had commenced. By May of the same year, Roberts revealed that the first cut of the movie had been completed.

FilmNation Entertainment sold international distribution rights at the 2024 Cannes Film Festival.

== Release ==
In September 2026, the film received a PG-13 rating from the Motion Picture Association.
