= 47 Meters Down =

2017 film by Johannes Roberts

- Theatrical release poster
- Directed by: Johannes Roberts
- Written by: Johannes Roberts; Ernest Riera
- Produced by: James Harris; Mark Lane
- Starring: Claire Holt; Mandy Moore; Matthew Modine
- Cinematography: Mark Silk
- Edited by: Martin Brinkler
- Music by: Tomandandy
- Production companies: The Fyzz Facility; Dragon Root; Flexibon Films; Lantica Pictures; Dimension Films
- Distributed by: Entertainment Studios (North America); Entertainment One (United Kingdom)
- Release dates: 12 June 2017 (Regency Village Theatre); 16 June 2017 (United States); 26 July 2017 (United Kingdom)
- Running time: 85 minutes
- Countries: United Kingdom; United States
- Language: English
- Budget: $5.3 million
- Box office: $62.6 million

47 Meters Down is a 2017 survival horror film directed by Johannes Roberts, written by Roberts and Ernest Riera, and starring Claire Holt and Mandy Moore. The plot follows two sisters who are invited to cage dive while on holiday in Mexico. When the winch system holding the cage breaks and the cage plummets to the ocean floor with the two girls trapped inside, they must find a way to escape, with their air supplies running low and great white sharks stalking nearby.

47 Meters Down was released in the United States on 16 June 2017 and in the United Kingdom on 26 July 2017. The film received generally mixed reviews from critics, but was commercially successful, grossing $62 million worldwide against a budget of about $5 million.

A sequel, 47 Meters Down: Uncaged, was released on August 16, 2019.

== Plot ==
Sisters Lisa and Kate are on vacation in Mexico after Lisa's boyfriend recently broke up with her. They decide to go shark watching from a diving cage with two local men. Arriving at the docks, Lisa, who has never dived, is wary of the boat and its owner, Captain Taylor, as well as this off-the-books activity. They also lie to him and tell him that they are both experienced scuba divers. Taylor doesn't question it and agrees to take them out.

Lisa and Kate make a descent in a cage, with masks that allow them to talk to Taylor on the surface and to each other. They are soon surrounded by great white sharks, but the winch boom breaks free and the cage sinks to the ocean floor, 47 m (154 ft) below the surface and out of communication range with the boat. Kate swims up until she is able to resume communication with Taylor, who tells her that one of his men, Javier, will be coming down with a spare winch cable. He advises them to stay in the cage because the sharks are close by, and to avoid swimming up directly no matter what, due to the high possibility of having nitrogen bubbles form in their brain, being most likely fatal. Both women are running out of air but soon see a flashlight in the distance.

Lisa swims out to attract attention, managing to avoid a shark which tries to attack her. She becomes disoriented and Javier attempts to usher her back towards safety, but he is killed by a shark. Lisa takes his spear gun and the winch cable and swims back to the cage. The spare cable is attached, but it snaps and the cage sinks back down, landing on Lisa's leg and pinning her. Kate tells Taylor they are low on air and Lisa is trapped. He sends air tanks down and tells them the coast guard is an hour away. He also warns that the second tank may cause nitrogen narcosis, which can lead to hallucinations. Kate leaves the cage to retrieve the air tanks and also finds three flares, but as she returns to the cage, she is attacked and apparently devoured by a shark.

Using the spear gun laying nearby, Lisa manages to pull one of the air tanks to her but cuts her hand in the process. She manages to attach her second air tank in the last possible second, finding herself waiting for the coast guard alone. Suddenly, Kate's voice comes through her radio, saying she's alive but badly hurt and surrounded by sharks. Lisa uses her BCD to lift up the cage, freeing her leg, and she swims to Kate. Due to the nature of Kate's injuries, as well as the shark having punctured her BCD and air tank, with oxygen escaping rapidly, the sisters decide to swim to the surface, using one of the flares to scare off the sharks. At the 20-meter mark, Taylor reminds them they must wait five minutes to decompress and avoid the bends. Kate accidentally drops the second flare and lights the third, discovering that they are surrounded by sharks.

As the third flare goes out, they drop their gear and make a break for the surface. A shark bites one of Lisa's legs, but she escapes and both women make it to the boat. Lisa is attacked again, and when the men finally manage to pull the sisters onto the boat, they see that she has lost half of her leg.

It is then revealed that Lisa has been hallucinating due to nitrogen narcosis and that she is still at the bottom of the ocean with her leg pinned under the cage, with Kate gone. As Coast Guard divers arrive to rescue her, she begins coming out of her hallucination, calling out for Kate, who she realizes was killed earlier by the shark.

== Cast ==
- Claire Holt as Kate
- Mandy Moore as Lisa
- Matthew Modine as Captain Taylor
- Chris Johnson as Javier
- Yani Gellman as Louis
- Santiago Segura as Benjamin

== Production ==
Principal photography took place in the Dominican Republic, and Pinewood Indomina Studios, Dominican Republic in July 2015, and concluded the following month. Lukas Seoane worked as a consultant to authenticate the shark behaviors. Additional photography took place in January 2016.

== Release ==
Original distributor Dimension Films had initially set a North American DVD and VOD release date for 2 August 2016. However, on 25 July 2016, Variety reported that Dimension had sold the rights to Entertainment Studios. Entertainment Studios cancelled the 2 August home release and instead committed to a theatrical release in the United States in summer 2017. The working title for the film was 47 Meters Down, which Dimension had changed to In the Deep for their home release, but upon acquiring the film Entertainment Studios reverted to the original title. Dimension had already sent out screeners and shipped DVDs to retailers before the deal took place. The DVDs, under the title In the Deep, were recalled. However, several retailers broke the street date, and a handful of physical copies were sold and have since turned up on eBay as collector's items.

The film was released theatrically in the United Kingdom on 26 July 2017 and in the United States on 16 June 2017, and spent about $30 million on prints and advertising.

== Reception ==
=== Box office ===
47 Meters Down grossed $44.3 million in the United States and Canada and $17.4 million in other territories for a worldwide total of $61.7 million, against a production budget of $5.5 million.

In North America, 47 Meters Down was released alongside All Eyez on Me, Rough Night and Cars 3 and was initially projected to gross around $5 million from 2,300 theatres in its opening weekend. It made $4.5 million on its first day (including $735,000 from Thursday night previews), increasing weekend estimates to $11 million. It went on to debut to $11.5 million, finishing 5th at the box office. In its second weekend, the film dropped 34%, grossing $7.4 million and finishing 4th at the box office. It was the second highest grossing indie film of 2017.

=== Critical response ===
On Rotten Tomatoes, the film has an approval rating of 53% based on 161 reviews, with an average rating of 5.4/10. The website's critical consensus reads, "47 Meters Down doesn't take its terrifying premise quite as far as it should, but its toothy antagonists still offer a few thrills for less demanding genre enthusiasts." On Metacritic the film has a weighted average score of 52 out of 100, based on 24 critics, indicating "mixed or average" reviews. Audiences polled by CinemaScore gave the film an average grade of "C" on an A+ to F scale, while PostTrak reported filmgoers gave it a 55% overall positive score.

Joe Leydon of Variety wrote: "Director Johannes Roberts' mostly underwater thriller is a compact and sturdily crafted B-movie that generates enough scares and suspense to qualify as — well, maybe not a pleasant surprise, but a reasonably entertaining one."

=== Accolades ===
47 Meters Down was nominated for the 44th Saturn Awards as Best Horror Film in 2018 but lost to Get Out.

== Sequel ==
On 8 September 2017, it was announced that production studio, The Fyzz Facility, is working on a sequel titled 48 Meters Down, in which Roberts, Riera, and Harris & Lane will return as director/writer, co-writer, and producers, respectively. The sequel is set in Mexico and centers around a group of young women who decide to explore some hidden underwater ruins located off-the-beaten trail. None of the cast from the previous film returns in the sequel. The new cast members are John Corbett, Nia Long, Sophie Nelisse, Corinne Foxx, Sistine Stallone, Brianne Tju, Davi Santos, Khylin Rhambo and Brec Bassinger. 47 Meters Down: Uncaged was released August 16, 2019.

== See also ==
- 47 Meters Down (film series)
- List of killer shark films
- Open Water (film)
- The Reef (2010 film)
- The Shallows (film)
