= Baby Blue (2023 film) =

2023 American film

- 2024 Tubi streaming poster
- Directed by: Adam Mason
- Written by: Simon Boyes; Adam Mason
- Produced by: Aramis Knight; Adam Mason; Bradley Pilz; Phil Rose
- Starring: Aramis Knight; Ally Ioannides; Cyrus Arnold; Dylan Sprayberry; Lia McHugh; Paris Berelc; Khylin Rhambo; Oliver Cooper; Jorge-Luis Pallo; Ellen Karsten; Anthony Turpel
- Cinematography: Mac Fisken
- Edited by: Adam Mason; Andrew Wesman
- Music by: Jimmy LaValle
- Production company: Microdose Entertainment
- Distributed by: XYZ Films
- Release date: June 24, 2023 (United States)
- Running time: 85 minutes
- Country: United States
- Language: English
- Box office: $67,017

Baby Blue is a 2023 American supernatural horror film directed by Adam Mason and starring Aramis Knight (who was also a producer), Ally Ioannides, Cyrus Arnold, Dylan Sprayberry, Lia McHugh, Paris Berelc, Khylin Rhambo, Oliver Cooper, Jorge-Luis Pallo, Ellen Karsten, and Anthony Turpel. Written by Mason and Simon Boyes, the film follows a group of teenagers who decide to make a true crime video podcast about deceased serial killer Baby Blue (Turpel), only for the killer to continue his murder spree.

== Premise ==
A group of teens stumble across the story of deceased serial killer Baby Blue and decide he'd be the perfect subject of a true crime video podcast. But when they start digging, they quickly discover that his murder spree never stopped. Now the teens are being targeted from beyond the grave.

== Cast ==
- Aramis Knight as JJ
- Ally Ioannides as Alice
- Cyrus Arnold as August
- Dylan Sprayberry as Hutch
- Anthony Turpel as Baby Blue
- Oliver Cooper as Mo
- Lia McHugh as Laura
- Khylin Rhambo as Kelvin Jones
- Paris Berelc as Joy Glass
- Sal Lopez as Bud
- Jorge-Luis Pallo as Manos Sloan
- Bries Vannon as David
- Ellen Karsten as Mama
- Hayley Autumn as Sadie
- Brooks Hayes as Ellen
- Michole Briana White as Dr. Barrett
- Heather Wake as Brends
- Bradley Pilz as Hardware Store Clerk

== Production ==
Baby Blue, which was produced by Microdose Entertainment, was shot in Los Angeles, California. Jackrabbit Media helped executive produce the film. Johannes Roberts was an executive producer on the film. Director Adam Mason described the film as a "love letter to the kind of books and movies I grew up loving, particularly the Stephen King novels that I loved so much as a teenager. It felt like no one was making those kinds of films for the YA market, and the teenage me would be really missing out today."

== Release ==
Baby Blue was digitally released by XYZ Films in the United States on June 24, 2023. The film was also released on Tubi as an original film from the streaming service. The film received a theatrical release in Russia on January 23, 2025.

== Reception ==
=== Box office ===
In Russia, Baby Blue grossed $34,194 during its opening weekend. The film ended its run in the country with a gross of $67,017.

=== Critical response ===
Sam Panico of B&S About Movies gave the film a positive review, stating, "There are a lot of people complaining about the acting in this movie, so I ask you, fellow movie watchers, tell me you didn’t rent tons of direct-to-video horror in the 90s without telling me."
