= Darren Day =

English actor, singer and TV presenter (born 1968)

- Born: Darren Graham; 17 July 1968 (age 58); Colchester, Essex, England
- Occupations: Actor, singer, television presenter
- Years active: 1987–present

Darren Day (born Darren Graham; 17 July 1968) is an English actor, singer and television presenter, known for his West End theatre starring roles.

== Early life ==
Day was born in Colchester, Essex, and attended Sir Charles Lucas Arts College. He undertook drama classes at evenings and weekends until he was 13, when he turned his attention to snooker. He became a professional snooker player at 17, but found himself drawn to entertainment.

== Career ==
Day started his career as part of a comedy cabaret trio when he was 17. He also worked as a Butlin's redcoat for a season. He later went solo and auditioned for BBC's talent show Opportunity Knocks in 1987 and appeared on the show in 1988, introduced by host Bob Monkhouse. He won several heats and came fourth in the final.

Day made his breakthrough as an actor in London's West End theatre, starring in Joseph and the Amazing Technicolor Dreamcoat when he replaced the departing Phillip Schofield. He then starred in many West End shows, such as Grease, Summer Holiday and Godspell and went on to develop a career as a television presenter, presenting programmes such as You Bet!, and Don't Try This at Home!. In 1991, Day presented the Classic Nursery Rhymes video.

Day has appeared in many touring stage musicals, including Summer Holiday, Grease, The Rocky Horror Show, Hello Dolly and Great Expectations. In 2007, Day made a guest appearance in July on ITV's police drama The Bill.

In 2001, he appeared in Lily Savage's Blankety Blank, and in 2002, he appeared in the first series of the reality television show I'm a Celebrity... Get Me Out of Here!

In 2007, Day returned to pantomime at the Lowry, Salford as King Rat in Dick Whittington. In 2009 he changed management and was then cast in the musical, We Will Rock You, alongside Kevin Kennedy, which toured the UK. From October 2010 to January 2011, Day played soap villain Danny Houston in the popular series Hollyoaks.

In early 2012, Day took on the role of American author Paul Sheldon in a production of Misery. The production was nominated for a Time Out Theatre Award. In Autumn 2012, he played HIV-positive gospel singer Gideon in the European premiere of the award-winning USA musical The Last Session; he was nominated for Offie for Best Actor. In September 2013, he starred in the new musical comedy "Stand Up" with Lionel Blair and Billy Pearce. In 2014, he revisited his cabaret roots when he stepped in for his old friend, Joe Longthorne, who was ill. He then guested on the Holby City Christmas Special, playing panto dame Michael Evans. In 2015, he toured his solo cabaret internationally.

On 5 January 2016, Day entered the Celebrity Big Brother house as a housemate. On 5 February, he reached the final and finished in third place. On 27 July 2016 it was announced that Day would head the cast of the new Robert J. Sherman musical Bumblescratch at the Adelphi Theatre on 4 September 2016. The event was in aid of Variety and Day was named a Celebrity Ambassador for the charity.

In February 2016, Day released This is the Moment, an album of his favourite musical theatre songs. He joined the tour of Priscilla, Queen of the Desert in the same month, sharing the role of Tick/Mitzi with Duncan James and Jason Donovan. The feature film White Island in which he plays villain Rik Searle was premiered in London on 10 October 2016.

A regular in pantomime, in 2016 he played Captain Hook at the Alhambra Bradford, and reprised the role in 2017 at the Hull New Theatre.

In March 2017, Day toured in Grease in the role of Teen Angel, a revival of the show in which he had previously played Danny Zuko. In October 2017, he joined the cast of the Sky 1 show, Stella, playing new family member Will Morgan.

Darren returned to pantomime in 2022 starring in Peter Pan as Captain Hook at the Regent Theatre, Ipswich

In 2023, the feature film Rudy was released where Day played the character of Thomas Wallace, for which he won the award for Best Supporting Actor at the British Independent Film Festival.

In 2021 and 2025, Day toured the UK and Ireland in Chicago: The Musical playing the role of lawyer Billy Flynn.

In the 2025–26 pantomime season, Day appeared as Fitzwarren in Dick Whittington and His Cat at the Gordon Craig Theatre, Stevenage.

== Personal life ==
In the 1990s, Day was engaged to Anna Friel, Tracy Shaw and Isla Fisher. In the 2000s, he was engaged to Adele Vellacott and Suzanne Shaw. Day is the father of Shaw's first child, a son named Corey MacKenzie Shaw-Day (born 16 December 2004). In 2007, he married actress Stephanie Dooley; they had a son named Dalton Day (born 1 November 2011) and daughter named Madison Day (born 2 October 2006), before divorcing in 2019.

In April 2010, Day was found guilty of his second drink-driving offence in two years, and banned from driving for five years. He was also convicted of possessing an offensive weapon, namely a kubotan-style keyring, by a court in Edinburgh.

In August 2020, Day got engaged to Sophie Ladds, an actress and disclosed his borderline personality disorder.

== Filmography ==
=== Film ===
Year	Film	Role	Notes
1991	Classic Nursery Rhymes	Himself	Direct to video
2002	Alice	Jonathan	Short film
2004	Hellbreeder	Sam	Feature film, directed by James Eaves & Johannes Roberts
2016	White Island	Rik Searle	Feature film, directed by Benjamin Turner
2017	Dangerous Game	Demetri	Feature film, directed by Richard Colton
2018	The Krays: Dead Man Walking	Don Dunn	Feature film, directed by Richard John Taylor
2023	Rudy	Thomas Wallace	Feature film, directed by Shona Auerbach

=== Television ===
Year	Show	Role	Notes
1996–97	You Bet!	Presenter	2 series; 20 episodes
2001	Doctors	David Wilde	Recurring; 8 episodes
2002	I'm a Celebrity...Get Me Out of Here!	Himself	Campmate
2004	French and Saunders	Inman/Jude Law	2 episodes
2007	The Bill	Jeff Slade	1 episode: Copy Cat Killer
2010	Hollyoaks	Danny Houston	Recurring; 26 episodes
2010	Come Dine with Me	Himself	Celebrity Special
2012	Crime Stories	Graeme Watts	1 episode; Episode 5
2014	Holby City	Michael Evans	1 episode; Christmas Special
2016	Celebrity Big Brother 17	Himself	Housemate, third place
2017	Stella	Will Morgan	3 episodes

== Discography ==
=== Singles ===
- "Young Girl" (1994), No.42 UK
- "Summer Holiday Medley" (1996), No.17 UK
- "How Can I Be Sure?" (1998), No.71 UK
- "Wired For Sound" (2007), No.66 UK
- "Only The Good Die Young" (2011), For The Soldiers Charity

=== Albums ===
- Summer Holiday (1996)
- Darren Day (1998), No.62 UK
- The Last Session (2013)
- This Is The Moment (2016)

Preceded by Matthew Kelly	Host of You Bet! 1996–97	Succeeded by Series Ended
