= Kaitlin Vilasuso =

American actress and podcast host

- Born: Kaitlin Ann Riley; July 17, 1986 (age 40); Fort Lauderdale, Florida, U.S.
- Other name: Kaitlin Riley
- Citizenship: United States; Canada
- Occupation: Actress
- Years active: 1997–present
- Spouse: Jordi Vilasuso (m. 2012)
- Children: 3
- Relatives: Bailee Madison (sister)

Kaitlin Ann Vilasuso (née Riley; born July 17, 1986) is an American actress and podcast host. She is best known for her roles in films From Justin to Kelly (2003), Monster (2003) and Watercolor Postcards (2013).

== Early life ==
Kaitlin Ann Riley was born on July 17, 1986, in Fort Lauderdale, Florida to Patricia and Michael Riley. She is one of seven children and her younger sister, Bailee Madison, is also an actress.

== Career ==
She has appeared in films Catherine's Grove (1997), In the Shadows (2001), From Justin to Kelly (2003), Monster (2003), Scavengers (2013) and Watercolor Postcards (2013). She portrayed Lexy in American television sitcom Kickin' It in the episode "Wedding Crashers".

From November 2018 to November 2019, she co-hosted the podcast Just Between Us with her sister Bailee Madison.

== Personal life ==
She is married to actor Jordi Vilasuso, and they have three children.

== Filmography ==
	Title	Role	Notes
1997	Catherine's Grove	Young Catherine	
2001	In the Shadows	Mandy	
2003	From Justin to Kelly	Ashley	
2003	Monster	Teenage Aileen Wuornos	
2012	Kickin' It	Lexy	Episode: "Wedding Crashers"
2013	Scavengers	Scavenger	
2013	Watercolor Postcards	Becky Mae	
