= Kevin Quinn (actor) =

American actor and singer

- Born: Kevin Gerard Quinn; May 21, 1997 (age 29); Chicago, Illinois, U.S.
- Other name: Kevin G. Quinn
- Occupations: Actor and singer
- Years active: 2013–present

Kevin Gerard Quinn (born May 21, 1997) is an American actor and musician. He is known for his starring role as Xander in the Disney Channel original series Bunk'd and for his roles in the 2016 Disney Channel Original Movie Adventures in Babysitting and the 2021 Netflix film A Week Away.

== Early life ==
Quinn was born Kevin Gerard Quinn on May 21, 1997 in Chicago, and grew up in Wilmette, Illinois. His parents are Brian Quinn, an advertising executive, and Tamara (née Timko) Quinn, founder of Pulling Down the Moon. He has a twin sister. Growing up, Quinn was involved in Musical Theater productions at the Children's Theater of Winnetka, a lesser known theater company near his hometown.

== Career ==
He began his professional career by appearing in episodes of Shameless and Chicago P.D. Before being on Disney, he auditioned for season 12 of American Idol. He wound up being one of the top 60 males in the country. He then played Jonny in Steppenwolf Theater's production of Lord of the Flies, and the role of “Boy” in the Chicago Shakespeare Theater adaptation of Henry V.

In 2015, Quinn was cast on the spinoff Disney Channel series Bunk'd. In 2016, he appeared in the Disney Channel Original Movie Adventures in Babysitting. In 2018, he played the supporting role of Brian Sudermill in the drama film Canal Street. In 2019, Quinn played the supporting role of Danny Scanton in the Hallmark Channel original film, A Christmas Love Story, alongside Kristin Chenoweth.

In 2020, he played a minor role in Adam Sandler's comedy film Hubie Halloween. In 2021, Quinn starred in teen Christian musical drama, A Week Away, alongside Bailee Madison, which premiered on Netflix in March 2021.

== Personal life ==
Quinn confirmed in a 2024 interview that he had been diagnosed with borderline personality disorder. He is a Christian.

== Filmography ==
Film, television and video game roles
| Year | Title | Role | Notes |
|---|---|---|---|
| 2013 | American Idol | Himself | Contestant (season 12) |
| 2014 | Chicago P.D. | Nate Hansen | Episode: "Get My Cigarettes" |
| 2015 | Shameless | 17 Year Old Boy | Episode: "I'm the Liver" |
| 2015–2017 | Bunk'd | Xander | Main role (seasons 1–2) |
| 2016 | Adventures in Babysitting | Zac Chase | Disney Channel Original Movie |
| 2017 | Kingdom Hearts HD 2.8 Final Chapter Prologue | Gula | Video game; voice role |
| 2018 | Champions | Gregg | 3 episodes |
| 2018 | Canal Street | Brian Sudermill | Film |
| 2019 | Kingdom Hearts III | Gula | Video game; voice role |
| 2019 | A Christmas Love Story | Danny Scanton | Television film (Hallmark) |
| 2020 | Hubie Halloween | Pennywise Guy | Streaming film |
| 2021 | A Week Away | Will | Streaming film |
| 2021 | Send It | Billy Johnson | Direct-to-video film |
| 2024 | You Can't Run Forever | Todd | |
