= Hellbreeder =

2004 film by James Eaves and Johannes Roberts

- DVD cover art
- Directed by: James Eaves; Johannes Roberts
- Written by: Johannes Roberts; James Eaves
- Produced by: Miguel Ruz
- Starring: Lyndie Uphill; Dominique Pinon; Darren Day
- Cinematography: John Raggett
- Edited by: Peter Dobson
- Music by: Johannes Roberts
- Production company: Cat'N'Cage Productions
- Distributed by: Trinity Home Entertainment
- Release date: 4 October 2004
- Running time: 85 minutes
- Country: United Kingdom
- Language: English

Hellbreeder is a 2004 British horror/mystery film directed by James Eaves and Johannes Roberts, and starring Lyndie Uphill. The films centres around a killer clown who returns from Hell and goes on a murderous rampage.

== Plot ==
English police are baffled after a number of children are brutally murdered. Alice (Uphill) takes a profound interest in the murders as her own son, Daniel, was killed years ago and she is haunted by recurring nightmares. The event replays in her mind, as she remembers walking her son home late one night when they stop to rest on a park bench. They sit next to a clown, who gives Daniel a balloon. A man then rushes at them from the darkness and kills Daniel, injuring his mother. Alice clearly remembers the man's face. The same man has been spotted close to each of the murders in the current slayings. She confides this to Detective Weiss, the investigating officer.

Alice finds and confronts the man, and holds a gun to his head but can't bring herself to kill him. She instead takes him prisoner in an effort to hear his story. The man's name is Sam and informs Alice that he is hunting a creature from hell who kills children. Alice is unsure whether to believe him when she receives a call informing her that another child has been killed in front of witnesses, who report the murderer as being a clown. It is now that she comes to the realization that it wasn't Sam who killed her child but the clown and that her memory was wrong. She agrees to help Sam, who has been present at the murders not as a perpetrator but as the hunter of the monster, known as the Hellbreed.

Meanwhile, Detective Weiss has pulled up Alice's files and it is revealed that she has been committed to a mental institution in 1989. She escaped in 1995 and is still wanted by the authorities. Alice is handcuffed and taken to the institute. Outside they encounter the Hellbreed who kills Detective Weiss but leaves Alice unharmed and backs away. Sam arrives and kills the Hellbreed.

The film is interspersed with footage of Alice being interviewed, supposedly back at the institution after the events occurred. In this way she acts as a narrator. It is seen at that Alice has not obtained peace and breaks down in front of the camera before the image fades to black.

== Cast ==
- Lyndie Uphill as Alice, an escaped mental patient who is haunted by the murder of her son Daniel, for which her family blamed her. After hearing of a new wave of child slayings she is compelled to investigate.
- Dominique Pinon as Detective Weiss, an alcoholic police officer who is investigating the current murders.
- Darren Day as Sam, the man that Alice remembers as killing Daniel. He seems to be mysteriously close by during each of the murders.

== Release ==
Hellbreeder was released on DVD by MTI Home Video on 16 March 2004. Later that same year, it was released by Mosaic, and Trinity Home Entertainment on 4 and 19 October respectively. It was released for the first time on Blu-ray by Allegro Corporation on 1 February 2011. Allegro also released the film on DVD that same day.

== Reception ==
Matt Ferraz from HorrorNews.net noted that the film was essentially a rip-off of Stephen King's It, criticizing the film's overuse of surreal atmosphere and voice-overs, storytelling, repetitive dialogue, and lack of charisma from its lead actress. However, Ferraz concluded his review by writing, "looking from another point of view, the chaotic script and editing does make the movie look like a nightmare, what can be a good thing if you are more interested in atmosphere than in storytelling. That is not to say that the movie is scary, but there sure is a uncomfortable and distressing feel to it, something that is more than welcome in the genre."
