= A Week Away =

2021 film directed by Roman White

- Official poster
- Directed by: Roman White
- Screenplay by: Alan Powell; Kali Bailey
- Story by: Alan Powell; Kali Bailey; Gabe Vasquez
- Produced by: Alan Powell; Gabe Vasquez; Steve Barnett
- Starring: Bailee Madison; Kevin Quinn; Jahbril Cook; Kat Conner Sterling; David Koechner; Sherri Shepherd; Iain Tucker; Amy Grant; Steven Curtis Chapman
- Cinematography: James King
- Edited by: Parker Adams
- Music by: Adam Watts
- Production companies: Monarch Media; Rove Productions
- Distributed by: Netflix
- Release date: March 26, 2021
- Running time: 97 minutes
- Country: United States
- Language: English

A Week Away is a 2021 American Christian musical romance film directed by Roman White. The film was written by Alan Powell, Kali Bailey, and Gabe Vasquez. The film's songs were produced and mixed by Adam Watts and co-produced by Cory Clark (the team also co-wrote the film's original songs with Powell).

The film stars Bailee Madison, Kevin Quinn, David Koechner, and Sherri Shepherd with cameos from Amy Grant and Steven Curtis Chapman. Producers for the film are Alan Powell, Gabe Vasquez, and Steve Barnett. The film premiered on March 26, 2021, on Netflix. The film introduces songs of Christian artists such as Michael W. Smith, Amy Grant, and Steven Curtis Chapman to a younger generation with modern renditions of songs like "The Great Adventure", "Dive", "Baby, Baby", and "Place in This World."

== Plot ==
After Will Hawkins gets arrested for 'borrowing' a police car, he is told he now faces juvenile hall. This is because, as a minor in the foster system for six years, he has been expelled from seven schools and has changed foster homes 22 times. Police officer Mark tells Will his last option is juvie. Panicked, he begs for an alternative.

Just then, foster mother Kristin with her son George, visits Mark. As he is handling Will's case, she offers Will a home for the coming year, under the condition that he attend a week-long summer camp. Uninterested, when he is told he must choose between the camp and juvie, he changes his mind.

On the bus there, it is revealed to be a Christian camp, which Will is unfamiliar with. When he reaches the camp, a girl named Avery catches his eye. George introduces Will to Sean, who asks how they know each other. Not wanting to share his back story, he quickly makes up one about being cousins.

George and Will share a cabin, and there Will finds out that George likes a girl named Presley. So, he makes a deal with him to help each other out with their love interests, which includes not revealing Will's troubled background.

Signing up for paintball, through Avery and Presley, Will sees how shy George acts around her. After they have moved away from the booth, it is revealed that she is also interested, but his extreme shyness makes Presley unsure of his interest.

At night all the campers attend The Tribunal to organize the camp’s war game competition. There, the new campers are put into one of the three existing groups...red, blue or green. The red team captain is Avery, George leads green and Sean has blue.

The next day's competition includes dodgeball, where Presley gets pummeled by the blue team. Will tries to get George to check in with her, but he chickens out. The following morning, Will and Avery bump into each other in the woods, and she takes him to the special spot she and her dad maintain in tribute to her mother, who died a decade ago.

The following competitions are paint ball, flag football, pie eating contest, cornball, tug of war, three-legged race and hula hooping. Will and Avery call a temporary truce to wipe out blue team, but once they do she takes him out so red team wins. Red team is declared the winner, with the resentful Sean's team in third place.

That night, Will almost tells Avery the whole truth about his background, but chickens out. Meanwhile, Sean sneaks into the office, reading Will's file. He interrupts the green group's talent show practise to inform Will that he knows.

After the truth about his situation is revealed by Sean to Will's friends, Will leaves the camp to run away. Avery drives after him and tries to get him to return without success. He struggles with the thought of there being a loving God after what happened to his family.

In the end, Will decides to return to the camp and talent show, their song wins the green team the ultimate victory and he and Avery share a moment and a kiss together. When he least expects it, he discovers people who care about him.

== Cast ==
- Kevin Quinn as William "Will" Hawkins
- Bailee Madison as Avery
- Jahbril Cook as George Tanella
- Kat Conner Sterling as Presley Borsky
- Iain Tucker as Sean Withers
- David Koechner as David Farrell
- Sherri Shepherd as Kristin Tanella
- Ed Amatrudo as Mark Pearson
- Mari Kasuya as Dancer
- Brooke Maroon as Dancer
- Chelsea Corp as Dancer
- Brooklyn Wittmer as Camper
- Rena MacMonegle as Camper
- Steven Curtis Chapman as Lifeguard (cameo)
- Amy Grant as Camp Counselor (cameo)

== Soundtrack ==
=== Track listing ===
#	Title	Writer(s)	Performer(s)	Length
1	"Let's Go Make A Memory	Adam Watts, Alan Powell, Cory Clark	Kevin Quinn, Bailee Madison, Jahbril Cook, Kat Conner Sterling, Iain Tucker	2:33
2	"The Great Adventure"	Geoff Moore, Steven Curtis Chapman	Kevin Quinn, Bailee Madison, Jahbril Cook, Kat Conner Sterling, Iain Tucker & Sherri Shepherd	3:43
3	"Good Enough"	Adam Watts, Alan Powell, Cory Clark	Kevin Quinn, Bailee Madison, Jahbril Cook & Kat Conner Sterling	2:47
4	"Dive"	Steven Curtis Chapman	Kevin Quinn, Bailee Madison, Jahbril Cook, Kat Connor Sterling & Iain Tucker	3:01
5	"Baby, Baby"	Amy Grant, Keith Thomas	Jahbril Cook	2:22
6	"Place in This World"	Amy Grant, Michael W. Smith, Wayne Kirkpatrick	Kevin Quinn & Bailee Madison	3:12
7	"Big House"	Barry Blair, Bob Herdman, Will McGinniss and Mark Stuart	Kevin Quinn, Bailee Madison, Jahbril Cook, Kat Conner Sterling & Iain Tucker	3:40
8	"Awesome God" / "God Only Knows" (Campfire Medley)	Rich Mullins, Joel Smallbone, Jordan Reynolds, Luke Smallbone, Tedd Tjornhom & Josh Kerr	Kevin Quinn, Bailee Madison, Jahbril Cook, Kat Conner Sterling, Iain Tucker	2:20
9	"Where I Belong"	Adam Watts, Andy Dodd & Alan Powell	Kevin Quinn	3:48
10	"Best Thing Ever" (Stage Version)	Adam Watts, Alan Powell, Cory Clark	Kevin Quinn and Cast	2:23
11	"Best Thing Ever (Reprise)"	Adam Watts, Alan Powell, Cory Clark	Kevin Quinn, Bailee Madison, Jahbril Cook, Kat Conner Sterling, Iain Tucker	1:20
12	"Best Thing Ever"	Adam Watts, Alan Powell, Cory Clark	JOHNNYSWIM	4:04

== Awards and nominations ==
Award	Date of ceremony	Category	Result
Dove Award	2021	Inspirational Film of the Year	Won
