= Ally Ioannides =

American actress (born 1998)

- Born: Alexia Ioannides; January 1998 (age 28); Atlanta, Georgia, United States
- Occupation: Actress
- Years active: 2009–present

Alexia "Ally" Ioannides (born January 1998) is an American actress, best known for playing Dylan Jones in the NBC drama series Parenthood from 2014 to 2015, and Tilda in the 2015–2019 AMC martial arts drama series Into the Badlands.

== Early life ==
Ioannides was born in Atlanta, Georgia, and raised in Park City, Utah. Her grandfather was a Greek genocide survivor who moved to the United States as a teenager.

== Career ==
Ioannides gained her first professional acting role at age 11 as Esther in the stage adaptation of A Christmas Story. She continued with roles in plays such as White Christmas, Annie, and The Sound of Music.

By 2015, Ioannides was focusing mostly on film and television, notably as Dylan Jones on NBC's Parenthood. Her 2013 short film with Mark Moses, The Tsarevich, was shown at various film festivals and another short, Stray (2014), put her the top 200 for consideration in the fourth season of the series Project Greenlight. She also appeared as a guest star on Law & Order Special Victims Unit.

== Filmography ==
=== Film ===
Year	Title	Role	Notes
2009	The Alice Winter	Lyndie	Short film; as "Alexia 'Ally' Ioannides"
2012	Escape from Paper City	Older Daughter	Short animated film; voice role; as "Alexia 'Ally' Ioannides"
2013	The Tsarevich	Grand Duchess Anastasia	Short film
2013	Ephraim's Rescue	Martha Hanks - 15 years of age	Credited as Alexia Ioannides
2013	The Choir	Chorister	Documentary
2014	Served Cold	Sarah Richards	Short film
2014	Stray	Sammy	Short film
2014	The Hands		Short film
2014	Easy Money		Short film
2015	ANiMUS	Danielle Burling	
2015	Easy Money	Stephanie Livingston	Straight-to-video short film
2019	Synchronic	Brianna Dannelly	
2022	V/H/S/99	Lily	Segment: "Suicide Bid"
2023	Baby Blue	Alice	
2023	Trim Season	Harriet	
2023	Jesus Revolution	Janette Smith	
2025	Sweet Revenge	Eve	Short film

=== Television ===
Year	Title	Role	Notes
2014	Scarlett	Courtney	Web series; 3 episodes
2014–2015	Parenthood	Dylan Jones	Recurring role; 7 episodes
2015	Law & Order: Special Victims Unit	Heather Manning	Episode: "Devastating Story"
2015–2019	Into the Badlands	Tilda	Main role
2016, 2019	Elementary	"Mina Davenport"/Cassie Lenue	Episodes: "Miss Taken", "Miss Understood"
2022	The Good Doctor	Cady Stinson	Episode: "A Big Sign"
2022	The Sex Lives of College Girls	Sara	Episodes: "Winter Is Coming", "Frat Problems"
TBA	Bishop †	Mountain Girl	TBD episodes

Key
†	Denotes television productions that have not yet been released

=== Music videos ===
Year	Title	Artist(s)	Role	Ref.
2021	"Girlfriend"	Rebecca Black	Rebecca's Girlfriend	

=== Stage ===
Title	Role	Venue
Annie	Pepper	Pioneer Theatre
White Christmas	Susan Waverly	Pioneer Theatre
A Christmas Story	Supporting	Pioneer Theatre
The Sound of Music	Louisa Von Trapp	Hale Centre Theatre
Gypsy	Baby Louise	Egyptian Theatre
Hansel & Gretel	Chorus	Utah Opera
Annie	Annie	Egyptian Theatre
