= Jordi Vilasuso =

American actor (born 1981)

- Born: Jordi Alejandro Vilasuso; June 15, 1981 (age 45); Miami, Florida, U.S.
- Occupation: Actor
- Years active: 1996–present
- Spouse: Kaitlin Riley (m. 2012)
- Children: 3
- Relatives: Bailee Madison (sister-in-law)

Jordi Alejandro Vilasuso (/vɪləˈsuːsoʊ/; born June 15, 1981) is an American actor best known for originating the role of Tony Santos on the CBS soap opera Guiding Light from August 2000 until August 2003. He has also portrayed the roles of Griffin Castillo on All My Children from 2010 to 2011 and 2013, Dario Hernandez on Days of Our Lives from 2016 to 2017 and Rey Rosales on The Young and the Restless from 2018 to 2022. In 2017 portrayed Luke Byers, air marshall, in movie Altitude.

== Early life ==
Vilasuso was born in Miami, Florida. He was raised by his parents, Dr. Frank Vilasuso and Ana Vilasuso, in Coral Gables, Florida. He also has an older brother, Javier, and a younger sister, Marianne. Vilasuso attended Ransom Everglades High School and later Glendale Community College in California.

== Career ==
Vilasuso began playing Tony Santos on Guiding Light in August 2000. In 2003, he won the Daytime Emmy Award for Outstanding Younger Actor in a Drama Series for his portrayal. Vilasuso was also nominated in the same category in 2002.

Vilasuso has appeared in the movies The Last Home Run, The Lost City, Heights and La Linea. He also appeared in other television programs such as 8 Simple Rules, Buffy the Vampire Slayer, Numb3rs and CSI: Miami. In November 2010 he was signed on to play the contract role of Griffin Castillo on the soap opera All My Children. Vilasuso joined the cast of Days of Our Lives as Dario Hernandez in 2015. In July 2017, Vilasuso announced his departure from Days of Our Lives. In July 2018, it was announced that Vilasuso would appear as Rey Rosales on the daytime soap opera The Young and the Restless. In March 2022, Vilasuso announced his departure from The Young and the Restless. In December 2025, it was announced he had joined the cast of Beyond the Gates. He made his debut as Grayson Perez on January 16, 2026.

== Personal life ==
Vilasuso is married to actress Kaitlin Riley, and they have three children.

== Filmography ==
Year	Title	Role	Notes
1996	The Last Home Run	Tommy	
2000	Buffy the Vampire Slayer	Dixon	Episode: "Primeval"
2001	Angels Don't Sleep Here	Teenage Michael	
2002	A Wedding Story: Josh and Reva	Tony Santos	Uncredited
2000–2003	Guiding Light	Tony Santos	Contract role, August 29, 2000 – October 3, 2003
2003–2004	8 Simple Rules	Luke	2 episodes
2005	Heights	Benjamin's Ex	
2005	The Lost City	Jose Antonio "Manzanita" Echeverria	
2005	Numb3rs	Gabriel Ruiz	Episode: "Assassin"
2006	Fashion House	Eddie Zarouvian	28 episodes
2007	Rumbero	Alberto	
2008	Fire Bay	Ferrer	
2009	Ready or Not	The Matador	
2009	La Linea	Diablo	
2010	Bodas de Sangre	Leonardo	
2010–2011, 2013	All My Children	Griffin Castillo	Recurring role, December 16, 2010 – September 23, 2011; April 29–May 13, 2013 (144 episodes).
2015	Circle	Soldier	
2015	The Invitation	Miguel	
2016–2017	Days of Our Lives	Dario Hernandez	Series regular
2016	Below the Surface	Shane	TV film
2018–2022	The Young and the Restless	Rey Rosales	Series regular
2026	Beyond the Gates	Grayson Perez	Recurring role
