= Haley Strode =

American film and television actress

- Born: Owensboro, Kentucky, U.S.
- Occupation: Actress
- Years active: 2008–present

Haley Strode is an American actress. In 2012, she acted alongside Giovanni Ribisi in Gangster Squad, playing his character's wife. She has since starred in Nick@Nite's Wendell & Vinnie and in ABC's The Astronaut Wives Club, playing the role of Jane Conrad.

== Early life ==
Strode attended the University of Mississippi in Oxford, from which she graduated in 2007 with a BFA in Theatre Arts. While at college, Strode appeared in A Streetcar Named Desire as Stella, Noises Off! as Brooke, and The Importance of Being Earnest as Cecily.

== Career ==
Haley Strode's career in television began with a role on Comedy Central's Lewis Black's Root of All Evil.

Strode provided the voice of Jess' Mother in the independent film Jess + Moss, which was screened at the 2011 Sundance Film Festival. The film won Best Feature at the Prague Fresh Film Festival, and Best Narrative at the Dallas International Film Festival. Strode continued 2012 with roles on television series including CSI:NY, Castle, and Whitney, along with the NBC pilot, The New Normal. In 2012, Strode was series regular in the Nick at Night series Wendell & Vinnie, starring opposite Jerry Trainor.

Later that year, she appeared in the Warner Bros. release Gangster Squad (2012), directed by Ruben Fleischer. She played the role of Marcia Keeler, alongside Giovanni Ribisi as Detective Conway Keeler. Not long after, Strode played the nemesis of Laura Bell Bundy's character in the film Watercolor Postcards.

She went on to portray the role of real-life NASA wife Jane Conrad on ABC's drama series The Astronaut Wives Club. She also stars, in flashbacks, as Rita Forrester, the mother of Ed Westwick's character, in ABC's crime drama series Wicked City. That same year she was a recurring character on CMT's Still the King.

Strode co-produced the 2024 documentary film Let Them Be Naked, about sustainability in fashion, and directed the 2024 film Sidetracked.

== Filmography ==
=== Film ===
Year	Title	Role	Notes
2008	Southern Gothic	Megan	
2010	Las Angeles	Windy Stevens	
2010	The Murdererers	Miranda Winthrop	Short film
2011	Jess + Moss	Jess' Mother	
2012	Destinea, Our Island	Leah Bally	
2013	Gangster Squad	Marcia Keeler	
2013	Watercolor Postcards	Tammy	
2016	Full Moon Club	Fionna	Short film
2021	Overrun	Officer Ellen Burke	
2025	East of Wall	Laura	

=== Television ===
Year	Title	Role	Notes
2008	Mind of Mencia	Pregnant Woman	Episode #4.9
2008	Lewis Black's Root of All Evil	Sorority Girl	Episode: "Strip Clubs vs Sororities"
2009	Lost Tapes	Tracy Miller	Episode: "Oklahoma Octopus"
2011	CSI: NY	Injured Woman	Episode: "Indelible"
2012	Castle	Hot Young Woman	Episode: "Til Death Do Us Part"
2012	Whitney	Cute Girl	Episode: "Something Old, Something New"
2012	Fletcher Drive	Interventionist	Episode: "The Intervention"
2012	The New Normal	Waitress	Episode: "Pilot"
2012	Vegas	Ruth	Episode: "Solid Citizens"
2013	Wendell & Vinnie	Taryn Kleinberg	20 episodes
2013	Mob City	Ticket Girl	Episode: "Reason to Kill a Man"
2014	Perfect on Paper	Avery Goldstein	Television film
2015	The Astronaut Wives Club	Jane Conrad	4 episodes
2015	Wicked City	Rita Forrester	Episode: "The Very Thought of You"
2017	Doubt	Susan Bauer	Episode: "Clean Burn"
2017	iZombie	Macy	Episode: "Dirt Nap Time"
2017	Still the King	Regina Harper	2 episodes
2019	Doom Patrol	Dolores Mentallo (young)	Episode: "Flex Patrol"
2020	Legends of Tomorrow	Virginia Hill	Episode: "Miss Me, Kiss Me, Love Me"

=== Web ===
Year	Title	Role	Notes
2011	Level 26: Dark Revelations	Lisa	Episode: "Cyber-bridge Five"
