= Watercolor Postcards =

- Directed by: Rajeev Dassani
- Written by: Conrad Goode
- Starring: Laura Bell Bundy; Bailee Madison; Conrad Goode; Jonathan Banks; Kaitlin Vilasuso
- Cinematography: Adam Silver
- Music by: Jeff Russo
- Release date: 2013
- Country: United States
- Language: English

Watercolor Postcards is a 2013 American drama film directed by Rajeev Dassani and starring Laura Bell Bundy, Conrad Goode, Bailee Madison, John C. McGinley, Jonathan Banks, Joan Van Ark, and Claudia Christian. It was written by Conrad Goode.

== Plot summary ==
In Bent Arrow, West Texas everything seems to have moved on. Left behind are a precocious 10-year-old named Cotton and Butch, a gentle soul whose life has taken him on a path of heartache from the rough world of pro football, through heart wrenching loss to a roadside stand where he paints Watercolor Postcards. Butch starts to believe he can find happiness again when a relationship blossoms between Cotton's long-lost sister, Sunny, who returns home, disillusioned, after the loss of their mother, and ends up facing her tortured past.

== Cast ==
- Laura Bell Bundy as Sunny
- Conrad Goode as Butch
- Bailee Madison as Cotton
- Jonathan Banks as Ledball
- John C. McGinley as Merlin
- Claudia Christian as Cheryl
- Joan Van Ark as Momma
- Chad Faust as Tommy
- Kaitlin Riley as Becky Mae
- Ned Bellamy as Cricket
- Haley Strode as Tammy
- Rhett Giles as Jackson
- Steve Eastin as Morgan
- Mary-Pat Green as Tilda
- Paul Sanchez as Sheriff Perez
- Christian Ijin Link as Car Salesman / Doctor
- Elizabeth Baldwin as Nurse
- Art Bonilla as Preacher
- Wendy Schenker as Rescue Worker
- Jessica Starr Folger as Rescue Worker
- Jason Michael Lease as Dealership Patron
- Joe Ford as E.R Doctor
