= Canal Street (film) =

- Film poster
- Directed by: Rhyan LaMarr
- Written by: Adam Key; John Knitter; Rhyan LaMar
- Produced by: Amir Windom; Christopher Jennings; Eric Garnes; Rhyan LaMarr; Kevin Mullens
- Starring: Bryshere Y. Gray; Mykelti Williamson; Mekhi Phifer; Kevin Quinn; Woody McClain; Lance Reddick
- Cinematography: Nicholas M. Puetz
- Edited by: David C. Keith
- Music by: Amir Windom (music supervisor); Gretchen Yanover; Michael “Wave” Lane; Kevin “Khao” Cates; Gary Windom; Rhyan LaMarr
- Production companies: Red Guerilla Productions; NYC Films
- Distributed by: Smith Global Media
- Release dates: 13 June 2018 (American Black Film Festival); 18 January 2019 (United States)
- Running time: 89 minutes
- Country: United States
- Language: English
- Box office: $251,917

Canal Street is a 2018 American drama thriller film directed by Rhyan LaMarr. The film was distributed by Smith Global Media and opened over Martin Luther King Jr. Day weekend. It was filmed in Chicago. Canal Street was screened at the American Black Film Festival.

== Plot ==
Kholi Styles, a young black teenager, is wrongfully accused of the murder of his white classmate from Winnetka. His father, Jackie Styles, is an up-and-coming lawyer who goes to court to fight to prove his son's innocence.

== Cast ==
- Bryshere Y. Gray as Kholi
- Lance Reddick as Jerry Shaw
- Michael Beach as Ronald Morgan
- Jamie Hector as Pastor Sam Billings
- Mykelti Williamson as Jackie Styles
- Jon Seda as Detective Mike Watts
- Will Yun Lee as Officer Hank Chu
- Harry Lennix as DJ Terrance Palmer
- Mekhi Phifer as Prosecutor A.J. Canton
- FERN as (himself) FERN
- Reed Shannon as Joe
- Jacqueline Pinol as China
- William R. Moses as Bill Sudermill
- Nora Dunn as Marge Sudermill
- Tawny Newsome as Kai
- Yancey Arias as DJ Wado
- LaRoyce Hawkins as Amari Crawford
- Kevin Quinn as Brian Sudermill
- Lyric Ross as Tameka
- DeVon Franklin as The Key Note
- Juani Feliz as Zoey Swanson
- Woody McClain as MayMay
