= Sex and the Other Man =

- Directed by: Karl Slovin
- Written by: Karl Slovin
- Based on: Captive by Paul Weitz
- Produced by: John C. McGinley; Thomas J. Mangan IV
- Starring: Stanley Tucci; Kari Wuhrer; Ron Eldard; Conrad Goode; Jordan Foster
- Cinematography: Frank Prinzi
- Edited by: David Greenwald
- Music by: Anton Sanko
- Release date: June 13, 1995
- Running time: 89 minutes
- Country: USA
- Language: English

Sex and the Other Man (also known as Captive) is a 1995 American comedy-drama film written and directed by Karl Slovin, based on the 1990 play Captive by Paul Weitz. This film features music composed by Anton Sanko. The film stars Stanley Tucci, Kari Wuhrer, Ron Eldard and Conrad Goode in the lead roles.

== Plot ==
Arthur Wilkins (Stanley Tucci) becomes an unwitting hostage when Bill Jameson (Ron Eldard), frustrated by a failing sex life and suspicious that his girlfriend Jessica (Kari Wuhrer) has been unfaithful, confronts her boss in their apartment. After catching them together, Bill ties up the boss and demands hush money — only to discover that sharing the bedroom drama with a captive audience rekindles his own virility. What begins as a bizarre extortion escalates into increasingly perverse voyeuristic role-play, blending black comedy with unsettling intimacy, until the situation spirals into chaos and emotional reckoning.

== Cast ==
- Stanley Tucci as Arthur Wilkins
- Kari Wuhrer as Jessica Hill
- Ron Eldard as Bill Jameson
- Conrad Goode as John
- Jordan Foster as Bob
- Eric Slovin as Phil

== Reception ==
TV guide was very critical of the film: "Director Karl Slovin is to blame for staging this comedy with detrimental long pauses in between dialogue, and for generally mishandling his actors, but he can't take the rap for the pretentious bedroom farce bouncing on the bedsprings before us. Wuhrer is a sweet but recessive actress, so her contribution is negligible; the irrepressible Tucci tries to whip up the desired Edward Albee edge, but can't overcome the risible conception." as was Entertainment Weekly, "Bad acting, bad dialogue, and a ludicrous plot sink this awful direct-to-video black comedy" A similar assessment can be found in Leonard Maltin' Movie Guide, that mentions however that the cast was "good". Another brief review praises only Tucci's performance.
