= Play Dead (2022 film) =

2022 horror thriller film

- Theatrical release poster
- Directed by: Patrick Lussier
- Written by: Simon Boyes; Adam Mason
- Produced by: Lucas Jarach; Bradley Pilz; Johannes Roberts
- Starring: Bailee Madison; Jerry O'Connell
- Cinematography: Mac Fisken
- Edited by: Tommy Aagaard
- Music by: Steve Moore
- Production companies: Divide/Conquer; Green Light Pictures; Bradley Pilz Productions
- Distributed by: Voltage Pictures
- Release dates: December 9, 2022; January 5, 2023 (Limited release); March 17, 2023 (United Kingdom)
- Running time: 106 minutes
- Country: United States
- Language: English
- Box office: $356,840

Play Dead is a 2022 American horror thriller film directed by Patrick Lussier, and written by Simon Boyes and Adam Mason. The film stars Bailee Madison and Jerry O'Connell. The film's plot follows Criminology student Chloe (Bailee Madison) who fakes her own death to break into a morgue in order to retrieve a piece of evidence that ties her younger brother to a crime gone wrong.

== Plot ==
Chloe Albright, a young medical student, and her brother T.J. are being inundated with bills, their money is gone, and they’re about to lose their home – and this is just after the loss of their father. They’ve received no money from their father’s life insurance because his death was ruled as a suicide, they have medical bills to pay on top of all of their other debts, and they have nowhere to turn for a solution.

T.J., however, thinks he’s found a solution to their problems. Alongside his friend Ross, he plans to pull off a robbery armed with a fake gun. Whilst Ross enters the shop with the gun, T.J. sits behind the wheel of the car, ready to get them both out of there. But when Ross is shot by the store owner and the car comes under fire, T.J. flees. Whilst he’s confident that he’s destroyed all of the evidence linking him to the event, he realizes that there’s enough evidence on Ross’ phone to get him in trouble. So Chloe comes up with a plan. In order to get the phone before the police do, and prevent her brother going to jail, she fakes a drug overdose and gets herself sent to the coroner. But before she’s able to steal the phone and escape she realizes that she’s trapped inside the locked building with a monster, and the coroner can’t let her escape alive.

== Cast ==
- Bailee Madison as Chloe
- Jerry O'Connell as Coroner
- Anthony Turpel as T.J.
- Chris Lee as Ross
- Chris Butler as Sheriff Dugan
- Jorge Luis-Pallo as Mannix
- Kyler O'Neal as Randy
- Sterling Beaumon as Deputy Farmer

== Production ==
In May 2022, it was announced Voltage Pictures would be pre-selling the film to buyers at the Cannes Film Festival.

== Reception ==
Phil Hoad of The Guardian gave the film three out of five stars, praising the performances of Madison and particularly O'Connell's, stating that "Play Dead benefits most from O’Connell’s astute turn as the sharpest tailored killer since Patrick Bateman going about his business with a grim sang-froid and scarily controlled violence at the slab. It’s a terrible advert for organ donation but a compact and resourceful thriller."
