= Khylin Rhambo =

American actor (born 1996)

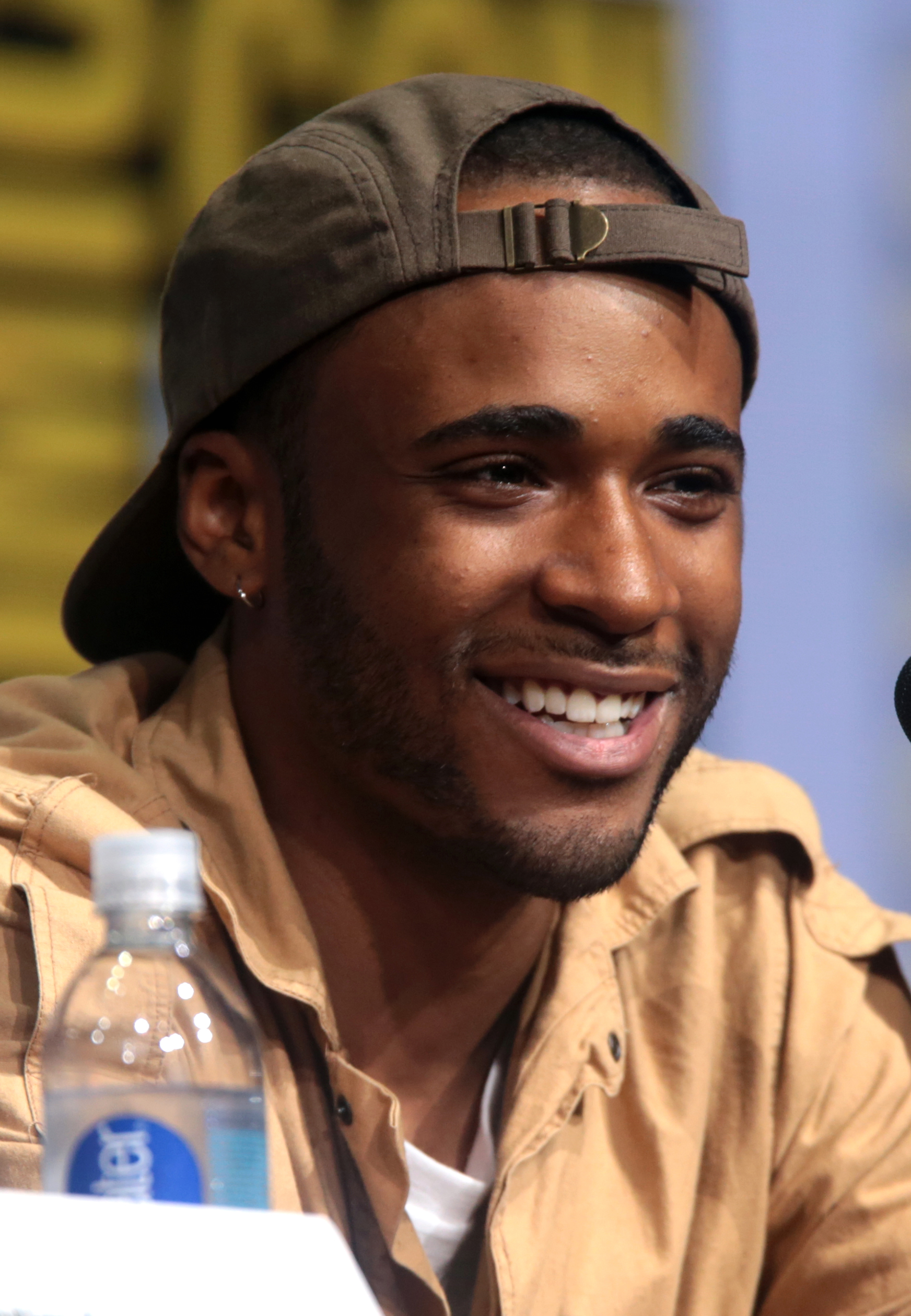
- Rhambo at the 2017 San Diego Comic-Con
- Born: January 8, 1996 (age 30)
- Occupation: Actor
- Years active: 2011–present
- Known for: The First Family; Teen Wolf

Khylin Rhambo (born January 8, 1996) is an American actor. He is best known for his roles as Charles Johnson on the television sitcom The First Family and as Mason Hewitt on MTV's show Teen Wolf.

== Early life ==
Rhambo started out his career at an early age. He modelled for various products such as Lee Jeans, Hasbro, Disney and Mattel Toys, before becoming interested in acting at the age of 8 and attending acting classes. After quickly gaining recognition by several talent agents who attended some of his acting classes, Rhambo booked work on several regional commercials.

== Career ==
Rhambo's first casting role came when he was cast as a guest star on the BET show Reed Between the Lines and later booked another guest star role on Criminal Minds. In 2013, he was cast in his first feature-film, the sci-fi thriller Ender's Game as Dink Meeker. In the following year, Rhambo began portraying, Mason Hewitt on the MTV show Teen Wolf, which is his breakthrough role and has brought him widespread recognition. He was also in the syndicated sitcom, The First Family from 2012 to 2015.

In December 2018, Rhambo was cast as Carl in 47 Meters Down: Uncaged, a sequel to the 2017 survival film 47 Meters Down.

In September 2021, it was announced that a reunion film for 2011 Teen Wolf television series had been ordered by Paramount+, with Jeff Davis returning as a screenwriter and executive producer for the film. The majority of the original cast members, including Rhambo himself, will reprise their roles. The film was released on January 26, 2023.

== Filmography ==
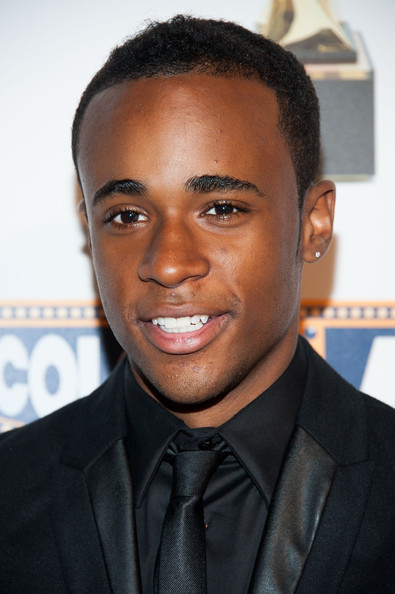
Rhambo at the 2013 ADCOLOR Awards

=== Film ===
Year	Title	Role	Notes
2013	Ender's Game	Dink Meeker	Based on the novel Ender's Game
2019	47 Meters Down: Uncaged	Carl	
2020	Just Say When	James	Short film
2023	Teen Wolf: The Movie	Mason Hewitt	
2023	Baby Blue	Kelvin Jones	
2023	Rock the Boat	Jahleel	
2024	Rock the Boat 2	Jahleel	
TBA	Don't Log Off	Brian	Filming

=== Television ===
Year	Title	Role	Notes
2011	Reed Between the Lines	Dillon	Episode: "Let's Talk About Jealousy"
2011	Criminal Minds	Damon Weeks	Episode: "There's No Place Like Home"
2012–2015	The First Family	Charles Johnson	Main role; 36 episodes
2013	Ironside	Boy #1	Episode: "Minor Infractions"
2014–2017	Teen Wolf	Mason Hewitt	Recurring role; 38 episodes
