= Someone Else's Summer =

2017 novel by Rachel Bateman

First edition (publ. Running Press)

Someone Else's Summer is the debut novel of Rachel Bateman. The novel was published in 2017 and follows seventeen year old Anna as she completes her older sister Storm's bucket list.

== Plot ==
Anna is a seventeen year old cheerleader and lifeguard whose life is turned upside down after her sister Storm dies in a car accident the day of her high school graduation. After her sister's death she finds herself feeling angry towards her best friend, Piper, and her boyfriend, Jovani, as neither one of them knew her shy sister very well. Instead she turns towards Storm's best friend Cameron.

After going into Storm's room for the first time since her death, Anna finds a bucket list of things she intended to do that summer. She ends up telling Cameron about it and they vow to live out Storm's dreams for her. Anna is set back by the fact that her still grieving mother wants to sell her sister's car and refuses to let her drive, but after confessing her plans to her father, he takes her mother on a Christian couples' retreat for grieving parents and gives her permission to go on a road trip with Cameron.

Anna and Cameron are quick to check off a few of the minor items on Storm's list as they drive along the coast hoping to end up at the dive-in movie that Storm bought tickets to before she died. Along the way Anna begins to be attracted to Cameron and notices that he is angry when she engages with other boys. At the top of a lighthouse (another item from Storm's list), Anna and Cameron kiss. The two realize that they have been attracted to one another for a long time.

One of Storm's dreams was to spend a night sleeping at the University of North Carolina at Wilmington. Cameron and Anna head there but Anna is surprised when she contacts her aunt and learns that despite being accepted into her dream college Storm never sent the cheque to secure her down payment on the university. She and Cameron go to the Carolina Beach Lake Park to the dive-in theatre and learn that it was destroyed by Hurricane Irene and never rebuilt.

Sleeping in the dorm, Anna is suspicious about why Storm wanted to spend a night there despite the fact that she was supposed to spend the following year there. Cameron confesses that Storm's cancer, which was supposedly in remission, had returned and she only had between 6 and 9 months to live. Angry that Cameron kept this secret from her and realizing that Storm probably committed suicide, Anna abandons the list and their road trip.

Anna's parents come home and Anna confesses everything to them including Storm's illness. To her surprise they both suspected that something was wrong and blamed themselves for the fact that she appeared to be refusing treatment.

Anna's mother grounds her for taking the road trip without her permission. Anna makes up with her friend Piper. A week later Piper and Jovani arrange for Cameron to come over and makeup with Anna. He then brings her to his backyard where he has assembles a series of kiddie pools and a sheet to make a homemade dive in theatre. While they watch the Lion King it begins to rain and Piper is able to cross off the second last thing she had to do on Storm's list which is kiss in the rain.

She realizes that the final item on the list which is "Be brave with my life" is an ongoing project and is happy that Storm's list will live on forever.

== Reception ==
Kirkus Reviews gave it a mixed review praising the romance aspects of the book while criticizing it for falling short as a novel about grief.

== Adaptation ==
Plans for a film adaptation of the novel were announced before the novel had been published.
