= Jorge Pallo =

American actor (born 1974)

- Born: Jorge Luis Pallo; January 8, 1974 (age 52); Queens, New York
- Occupation: Actor

Jorge Luis Pallo is an American actor of Hispanic descent. He is known for his role as Marc Molina on The Secret Life of the American Teenager and for his appearance on Sabrina the Teenage Witch. He also appeared in Murder in Mexico: The Bruce Beresford-Redman Story and played Ignacio "Iggy" Loca on Syfy’s The Lost Room.

== Early life ==
Born Jorge Luis Christian Pallo in Queens, New York, he of Puerto Rican and Ecuadorian parentage. Pallo was raised by single mother and once aspiring singer Pat Pallo. Though his mother could never figure out how to pursue a career in the entertainment industry, she encouraged all of her children to pursue their dreams by enrolling them in extra-curricular activities such as guitar, theatre, and dance. Armed with this support, he made his debut in the middle school production of "The Nutcracker". He later starred in high school productions of "Into the Woods" and "A Funny Thing Happened on the Way to the Forum".

After high school, Pallo was accepted into the TISCH School of the Arts at NYU. During his junior year Pallo finally connected to what would be his future career while starring in The Hangar Theatre's Summer Stock production of "A Few Good Men," directed by his mentor Bob Moss. After receiving his BFA, Pallo starred in several off-Broadway productions and joined the Latino sketch comedy group Vaso de Leche. A friend introduced him to his first manager who urged him to move to Los Angeles to further his career.

== Professional career ==
Pallo's move to LA was initially tumultuous, but he found solace while teaching acting classes at Scott Sedita Acting Studios. Kismet led Pallo to run into a fraternity brother, who was employed as a casting director, while playing a game of Texas Hold 'Em poker. This meeting allowed Pallo to work for six days on his fraternity brother's film, which got him a SAG card.

Pallo also works as an acting coach in Los Angeles to young Hollywood talent.

== Philanthropy ==
Pallo is also active in the Big Brothers Big Sisters program, P.S. ARTS, and The Hollywood Heart Foundation. Pallo chose Hollywood Heart and Toys for Tots because they are two charities that are near to his heart because he believes "being of service matters." Pallo participates yearly in an annual cocktail party to gather toys for kids for Christmas.

== Filmography ==
=== Film ===
Year	Title	Role	Notes
2002	Minority Report	Pre-Crime Public Service Announcer	
2005	War of the Worlds	Army Private	
2008	Eagle Eye	Intel Officer	
2013	Don't Pass Me By	Tony	
2013	Insidious: Chapter 2	Brian	
2015	Furious 7	Cop	
2015	Frankenstein	Officer Lincoln	
2016	Special Unit	Detective Rivera	by C. Titus
2016	Star Trek: Captain Pike	Captain Damien Sandoval	Fan film
2017	All I Want	Jorge	by W. Liang
2022	Play Dead	Mannix	

=== Television ===
Year	Title	Role	Notes
1997	Van-pires	Construction Worker	Episode "Mission Demolition"
1999	Ryan Caulfield: Year One	Himself	Episode: "Nocturnal Radius"
1999	Sabrina the Teenage Witch	Student	Episode: "Aging Not So Gracefully"
2000	Moesha	Dorian's Friend	Episode: "He Doth Protest Too Much"
2000	Missing Pieces	Messenger	TV movie
2000	Pacific Blue	unknown	Episode: "Kangaroo Court"
2000	Resurrection Blvd	Salvador Cabrera	4 episodes
2000	Unauthorized: The Mary Kay Letourneau Story	unknown	TV movie
2001	Charmed	Hector	Episode: "Muse to My Ears"
2001	NYPD Blue	Polo	Episode: "Love Hurts"
2002	The Shield	Gang Leader	Episode: "Our Gang"
2003	Luis	Jorge	Episode: "Bodega"
2004	Malcolm in the Middle	Driver	Episode: "Reese Joins the Army: Part 2"
2005	Medium	Armando	Episode: "Dead Aim"
2006	Numb3rs	Ignacio Nadal	Episode: "Double Down"
2006	In Justice	Jorge Rodriguez	Episode: "Badge of Honor"
2006	CSI: Miami	Javier Ravez	Episode: "Curse of the Coffin
2006	The Lost Room	Ignacio	The Key and the Clock; TV Mini Series
2006	Standoff	Kyle Fernandes	Episode: "Borderline"
2007	The Unit	Toro	Episode: "Binary Explosion"
2008	NCIS	Lt. Michael Sanchez	Episode: "Dog Tags"
2008	A Gunfighter's Pledge	Samuel	TV movie
2008	Groupidity	Kent	TV movie
2009	Eleventh Hour	Cristofer	Episode: "Pinocchio"
2009	24	Agent Kilner	2 episodes
2009	The Storm	Francisco Ramirez	The Storm, Part 2; TV mini-series
2008-2009	The Secret Life of the American Teenager	Marc Molina	35 episodes
2009	CSI: Crime Scene Investigation	John (trauma nurse)	Episode: "Death and the Maiden"
2010	Detroit 1-8-7	Luis Pena	Episode: "Shelter"
2011	Harry's Law	Detetive Maldonado	Episode: "A Day in the Life
2012	The Mentalist	Officer Downs	Episode: "His Thoughts Were Red Thoughts"
2012	Desperate Housewives	Detective Gillette	Episode: "You Take for Granted"
2012	Sons of Anarchy	Lupe	2 episodes
2012	CSI: NY	Hector "Toasty" Mendez	Episode: "Blood Out"
2012	The Blue Line	Fidel Rico	TV movie
2013	The List	Gio	TV movie
2014	Things You Shouldn't Say Past Midnight	Pedro 1	5 episodes
2015	Spin	El Chupacabra	Episode: "Pilot"
2015	Win, Lose or Love	Carlos	TV movie
2015	Murder in Mexico: The Bruce Beresford-Redman Story	Detective Ruiz	TV movie
2015	Criminal Minds	Agent Matt Lopez	Episode: "Internal Affairs"
2016	Scorpion	DEA Agent Sanchez	Episode: "Adaptation"
2013-2016	NCIS: Los Angeles	Special Agent Bomb Tech Salazar	3 episodes
2016	Fear the Walking Dead	Javier	Episode: "Shiva"
2016	Goliath	Alejandro Marquez	4 episodes
2016	Dr. Del	Dr. Guerrero	TV movie
2017	American Horror Story: Cult	Pedro Morales	3 episodes
