= Bailee Madison =

American actress (born 1999)

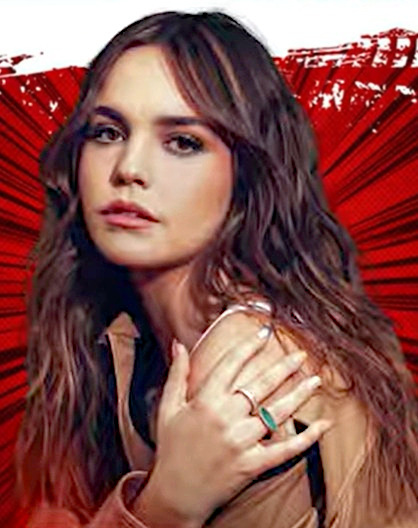
- Madison in 2025
- Born: Bailee Madison Riley; October 15, 1999 (age 27); Fort Lauderdale, Florida, U.S.
- Citizenship: United States; Canada
- Occupation: Actress
- Years active: 1999–present
- Agent: UTA
- Partner: Blake Richardson (2019–present)
- Relatives: Kaitlin Vilasuso (sister); Jordi Vilasuso (brother-in-law)

Bailee Madison (born October 15, 1999) is an American actress. Known for her work in film and television, she first gained attention as a child actress and later expanded into mature roles and in the horror genre. Her accolades include three Young Artist Awards, with nominations for a Critics' Choice Movie Award and a Saturn Award.

Madison gained recognition for her performances as a child in the films Bridge to Terabithia (2007), Brothers (2009), Just Go with It (2011), and Parental Guidance (2012). Her career progressed with recurring role in the Freeform drama series The Fosters (2014–2016) and leading roles in Hallmark's Good Witch (2015–2019) and in the Netflix musical film A Week Away (2021).

Madison subsequently garnered recognition for her performances in the horror genre, beginning with the slasher film The Strangers: Prey at Night (2018). This was followed by her portrayal of Imogen Adams in the HBO Max slasher horror series Pretty Little Liars (2022–2024), a spinoff of the eponymous original series, and independent horror film Play Dead (2022). These roles led to her being labeled a scream queen.

== Early life and background ==
Madison was born on October 15, 1999 in Fort Lauderdale, Florida, to Patricia Riley (née Williams) and Daniel Hotte. The youngest of seven children, she has four brothers and two sisters. Her elder half sister, Kaitlin Vilasuso, is also an actress. She has Canadian citizenship through her father.

Madison began her career when she was two weeks old, appearing in an Office Depot commercial. Since then, she has appeared in several national commercials for major companies including Disney, SeaWorld, and Cadillac.

== Career ==
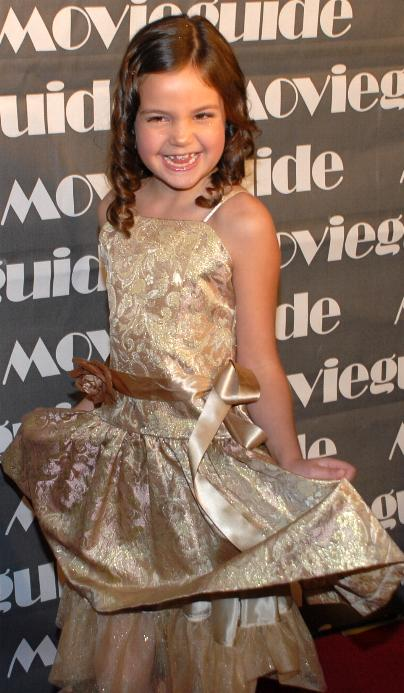
Madison at the Faith and Values Awards Gala in 2008

=== Child acting and breakthrough (2006–2013) ===
In 2006, Madison made her feature film debut in the crime film Lonely Hearts, which received mixed reviews from critics. In 2007, she appeared alongside Josh Hutcherson and AnnaSophia Robb in Gábor Csupó's fantasy drama Bridge to Terabithia, adapted from Katherine Paterson's novel of the same name. The film was Madison's first box office hit and received positive reviews from critics and audiences, with Madison's performance garnering acclaim. The New York Times critic Jeannette Catsoulis praised the film, Csupó's direction, and the leading performances, including Madison's. The performance earned her two Young Artist Awards. Also in 2007, she acted in the experimental film Look, which was shot entirely on CCTV, and in the Lifetime television drama Saving Sarah Cain. and Nickelodeon fantasy The Last Day of Summer. The latter, despite mixed reviews, won Madison another Young Artist Award.

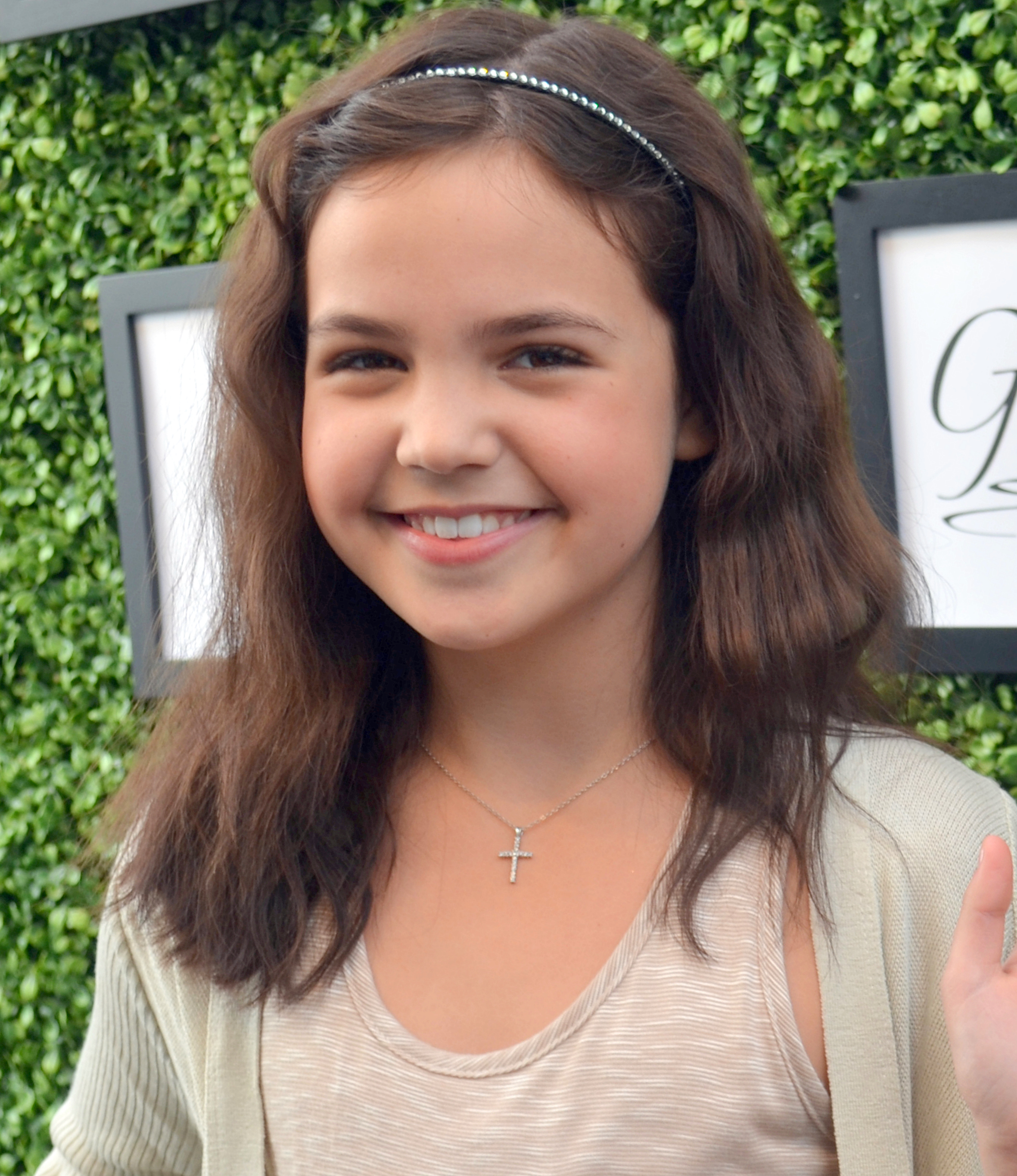
Madison at the Golden Globes Gift Lounge in 2012

Continued performances as a child actress came with Phoebe in Wonderland (2008), Brothers (2009), An Invisible Sign (2010), Conviction (2010), Letters to God (2010), and Don't Be Afraid of the Dark (2010). Brothers, a war drama in which she co-stars alongside Tobey Maguire and Natalie Portman, received praise from critics and earned Madison nominations for the Critics' Choice Movie Award for Best Young Performer and Saturn Award for Best Performance by a Younger Actor. Don't Be Afraid of the Dark, a supernatural horror film in which she portrayed the daughter of Katie Holmes and Guy Pearce's characters, was her first leading role and another critical success for Madison. Roger Ebert of the Chicago Sun-Times gave the film 3 1/2 stars out of 4, calling it "a very good haunted house film" and adding that it "milks our frustration deliciously." Released theatrically in 2011, the role earned her a nomination for Best Actress at the 19th Fangoria Chainsaw Awards. She also played roles in the comedies Just Go with It (2011) and Parental Guidance (2012), both of which were box office hits despite negative critical reception. She starred with James Cromwell in the family film Cowgirls 'n Angels (2012) and in the drama Watercolor Postcards (2013). The former was critically acclaimed for its "family-friendly" appeal.

Madison's early career was also characterized by a number of episodic guest roles on television and starring roles in television films. In 2010, she appeared in the Law & Order: Special Victims Unit episode "Locum" and, in the following year, portrayed Maxine Russo in some episodes of Wizards of Waverly Place at the time when Max Russo was turned into a girl.

=== Television and expansion (2013–2021) ===
In 2013, Madison began playing Hillary in the sitcom Trophy Wife, replacing Gianna LePera who played the character in the pilot. The following year, she began playing the recurring role of Sophia Quinn, a teenager with multiple mental health issues, in the ABC Family/Freeform drama The Fosters. From 2015 to 2021, Madison portrayed Grace Russell, the daughter of Cassie Nightingale, in the Hallmark fantasy series Good Witch. Madison continued in the role until the end of the fifth season in 2019.

In 2014 and 2015, Madison starred in the Christmas television film Northpole and sequel Open for Christmas. In his review for Variety, Brian Lowry called it "sweet and inoffensive, one needn't be a complete Grinch to wish the festive doings contained a little more spice and less saccharine." Mary McNamara of the Los Angeles Times wrote, "Northpole may be a cookie-cutter take on Christmas, but it's one with high-quality ingredients." Matt Roush of TV Guide wrote, "It's all very traditional, conventional, satisfying for those who like their schmaltz as concentrated as a double espresso".

In 2017, Madison produced and starred in A Cowgirl's Story. In the same year, it was announced that Madison would star in an adaptation of Rachel Bateman's novel Someone Else's Summer. However, it was never completed. The following year, she portrayed the leading role of Kinsey, a rebellious child in the slasher film The Strangers: Prey at Night, alongside Christina Hendricks and Martin Henderson. Although the film received mixed reviews from critics, Madison's performance was praised and the film was relatively successful at the box office.

=== Continued leading roles and musical debut (2021–present) ===
In 2021, Madison starred in two musicals, portraying the female romantic lead alongside Kevin Quinn and Michael Evans Behling, respectively, in the Netflix Christian musical drama A Week Away and Warner Bros' A Cinderella Story: Starstruck, and also performed for the soundtracks of both. The former received mostly negative reviews despite being successful on the streaming platform.

The following year, Madison played Imogen Adams in the HBO Max slasher horror drama series Pretty Little Liars, a spin-off of the eponymous original series, to critical acclaim. That year, she also led the horror film Play Dead. Phil Hoad of The Guardian gave the film three out of five stars, praising the performances including Madison's. The role, along with her other work in the horror genre, lent her recognition as a scream queen, a title the actress has admitted to "chasing down" in her career.

In 2024, Madison signed a deal with Red Van Records, releasing her first single, "Kinda Fun", on January 12, and her second single, "Chiller", on July 26. In April 2026, Madison signed with TFC Management. In 2026, she played a supporting role in the Netflix dark comedy Roommates, led by Sadie Sandler, the daughter of her Just Go with It costar Adam Sandler. The film received mixed reviews from critics. That same year, it was announced Madison would star with the latter Sandler in Grown Ups 3, the long awaited third film in the eponymous film series.

== Personal life ==
Since 2019, Madison has been in a relationship with Blake Richardson, from the band New Hope Club. She is also an avid supporter of English soccer club Manchester United.

== Other ventures ==
Since 2010, Madison has served as the national youth spokesperson for Alex's Lemonade Stand Foundation, a childhood-cancer charity organization that encourages kids to fundraise and spread awareness of pediatric cancer by running their own lemonade stands. In January 2018, Madison's first novel was published, Losing Brave, a young-adult mystery which was co-written with Stefne Miller. Since November 2018, she has co-hosted the podcast Just Between Us with her sister Kaitlin Vilasuso.

== Filmography ==
Key
| † | Denotes films that have not yet been released |

=== Film ===
| Year | Title | Role | Notes |
|---|---|---|---|
| 2006 | Lonely Hearts | Rainelle Downing | |
| 2007 | Bridge to Terabithia | May Belle Aarons | |
| 2007 | Look | Megan | |
| 2007 | Saving Sarah Cain | Hannah Cottrell | |
| 2008 | Phoebe in Wonderland | Olivia Lichten | |
| 2009 | Brothers | Isabelle Cahill | |
| 2010 | An Invisible Sign | Young Mona Gray | |
| 2010 | Conviction | Young Betty Anne Waters | |
| 2010 | Letters to God | Samantha Perryfield | |
| 2010 | Don't Be Afraid of the Dark | Sally Hurst | |
| 2011 | Just Go with It | Maggie Murphy (Kiki Dee) | |
| 2011 | 25 Hill | Kate Slater | Cameo |
| 2012 | Parental Guidance | Harper Simmons | |
| 2012 | Monica | Monica (voice) | Short film |
| 2012 | Cowgirls 'n Angels | Ida Clayton | |
| 2013 | The Magic Bracelet | Ashley | Short film |
| 2013 | Watercolor Postcards | Cotton | |
| 2016 | Annabelle Hooper and the Ghosts of Nantucket | Annabelle Hooper | Also producer |
| 2017 | A Cowgirl's Story | Dusty Rhodes | Also producer |
| 2018 | The Strangers: Prey at Night | Kinsey Roberts | |
| 2019 | Love & Debt | Melissa Warner | |
| 2021 | A Cinderella Story: Starstruck | Finley Tremaine | |
| 2021 | A Week Away | Avery | Also co-producer |
| 2022 | Play Dead | Chloe Albright | |
| 2026 | Roommates | Rebecca Anderson | |
| 2026 | 40 Dates and 40 Nights | Leah Jones | |
| TBA | Grown Ups 3 | | Post-production |

=== Television ===
| Year | Title | Role | Notes |
|---|---|---|---|
| 2007 | CSI: NY | Rose Duncan | Episode: "Boo" |
| 2007 | House | Lucy | Episode: "Act Your Age" |
| 2007 | The Last Day of Summer | Maxine | Television film |
| 2007 | Unfabulous | Young Addie Singer | 2 episodes |
| 2007 | Cory in the House | Maya | 2 episodes |
| 2007 | Judy's Got a Gun | Brenna Lemen | Television film |
| 2008 | Merry Christmas, Drake & Josh | Mary Alice Johansson | Television film |
| 2008 | Terminator: The Sarah Connor Chronicles | Little Girl | Episode: "What He Beheld" |
| 2010 | Law & Order: Special Victims Unit | Mackenzie Burton | Episode: "Locum" |
| 2010 | Hubworld | Herself | 1 episode |
| 2010–2012 | The Haunting Hour: The Series | Lilly Carbo / Jenny / Becky | 4 episodes |
| 2011 | Wizards of Waverly Place | Maxine Russo | 6 episodes |
| 2011 | Chase | Zoe | Episode: "Father Figure" |
| 2011 | Powers | Calista | Pilot |
| 2012 | A Taste of Romance | Hannah Callahan | Television film |
| 2012 | Smart Cookies | Daisy | Television film |
| 2012–2016 | Once Upon a Time | Young Snow White | 4 episodes |
| 2013 | Half | Riley Young | Television film |
| 2013 | Pete's Christmas | Katie | Television film |
| 2013 | Holliston | Bailee | Episode "Rock the Cradle" |
| 2013–2014 | Trophy Wife | Hillary Harrison | Main role; 21 episodes |
| 2014–2016 | The Fosters | Sophia Quinn | 11 episodes |
| 2014 | American Dad! | Sister | Episode: "Roger Passes the Bar" |
| 2014 | Northpole | Clementine | Television film |
| 2015–2019; 2021 | Good Witch | Grace Russell | Main role; 57 episodes |
| 2015 | Northpole: Open for Christmas | Clementine | Television film |
| 2015 | Mulaney | Ruby | Episode: "Ruby" |
| 2016 | Holiday Joy | Joy Hockstatter | Television film |
| 2016 | The Night Before Halloween | Megan | Television film |
| 2016 | Date with Love | Heidi Watts | Television film |
| 2022–2024 | Pretty Little Liars | Imogen Adams | Lead role |
| 2023 | The Hardy Boys | Drew "Darrow" / Sparewell | Recurring role |
| 2024 | Good Trouble | Sophia Quinn | Episode: "All These Engagements" |
| 2024 | Dancing with the Stars | Herself | 2 episodes |

=== Music videos ===
| Year | Title | Artist | Role | Notes |
|---|---|---|---|---|
| 2014 | "Do Life Big" | Jamie Grace | Herself | Cameo |
| 2017 | "Love You So" | Alex Lange | Alex's Girlfriend | |
| 2019 | "Foolish" | Meghan Trainor | Meghan's Party Guest | |
| 2019 | "All the Ways" | Meghan Trainor | The Bear's Love Interest | |
| 2019 | "Love Again" | New Hope Club | Blake's Girlfriend | |
| 2020 | "Worse" | New Hope Club | Blake's Girlfriend | Also director |
| 2022 | "Call Me a Quitter" | New Hope Club | Blake's Girlfriend | |

== Discography ==
=== Singles ===
List of singles as lead artist, showing year released and album name
| Title | Year | Album |
|---|---|---|
| "Kinda Fun" | 2024 | Non-album single |
| "Chiller" | 2024 | Non-album single |

== Awards and nominations ==
| Year | Association | Category | Nominated work | Result | Ref. |
|---|---|---|---|---|---|
| 2008 | Young Artist Awards | Best Performance in a Feature Film Young Actress Age Ten or Younger | Bridge to Terabithia | Won | |
| 2008 | Young Artist Awards | Best Performance in a Feature Film – Young Ensemble Cast | Bridge to Terabithia | Won | |
| 2008 | Young Artist Awards | Best Performance in a TV Series Guest Starring Young Actress | House | Nominated | |
| 2008 | Young Artist Awards | Best Performance in a TV Movie, Miniseries or Special – Supporting Young Actress | The Last Day of Summer | Won | |
| 2008 | Movieguide Awards | Most Inspirational Television Acting | Saving Sarah Cain | Won | |
| 2010 | Critics' Choice Movie Awards | Best Young Actress | Brothers | Nominated | |
| 2010 | Saturn Awards | Best Performance by a Younger Actor | Brothers | Nominated | |
| 2011 | Young Artist Awards | Best Performance in a Feature Film (Leading Young Actress Ten and Under) | An Invisible Sign | Nominated | |
| 2011 | Youth Rock Awards | Rockin' Child Performer (TV / Film) | Don't Be Afraid of the Dark | Nominated | |
| 2012 | Fangoria Chainsaw Awards | Best Actress | Don't Be Afraid of the Dark | Nominated | |
| 2012 | Young Artist Awards | Best Performance in a Feature Film – Supporting Young Actress | Just Go With It | Nominated | |
| 2013 | Young Artist Awards | Best Performance in a Feature Film – Young Ensemble Cast | Parental Guidance | Nominated | |

== Publications ==
- Losing Brave (January 24, 2018) (co-written with Stefne Miller)
