= Johannes Roberts =

English filmmaker

- Born: Johannes Christopher Edward Roberts; 24 May 1976 (age 49); Cambridge, England, UK
- Occupations: Film director, writer, producer
- Years active: 2001–present

Johannes Christopher Edward Roberts (born 24 May 1976) is an English filmmaker. He is best known for directing the horror films The Other Side of the Door (2016), 47 Meters Down (2017), The Strangers: Prey at Night (2018), Resident Evil: Welcome to Raccoon City (2021) and Primate (2025).

== Career ==
Johannes Roberts started his career making a series of micro budget horror films such as Sanitarium (2001), Hellbreeder (2003), Darkhunters (2004), Forest of the Damned (2005), Roberts wrote and directed the slasher film F (2010), which was made for only £100k, the film was picked up by Studio Canal and released theatrically in the United Kingdom.

Roberts then directed the television horror film Roadkill (2011) for Syfy and then directed the science fiction horror film Storage 24 (2012) for Magnet Releasing.

In 2016, Roberts wrote and directed the horror film The Other Side of the Door for 20th Century Fox. The film was produced by Alexandre Aja and starred Sarah Wayne Callies, Jeremy Sisto, Sofia Rosinsky, and Javier Botet.

In 2017, Roberts wrote and directed the survival horror film 47 Meters Down, starring Mandy Moore and Matthew Modine. Originally set to be released by The Weinstein Company and Dimension Films in 2016, the film was released on DVD by mistake in stores under the original title In the Deep. Entertainment Studios acquired the film and released it theatrically in 2017.

In 2018, Roberts directed the slasher film The Strangers: Prey at Night, a sequel to the 2008 film The Strangers and the second installment in The Strangers franchise, the film was released by Aviron Pictures it starred Christina Hendricks, Martin Henderson, Bailee Madison and Lewis Pullman.

In 2019, Roberts wrote and directed 47 Meters Down: Uncaged, the sequel to his film, 47 Meters Down which was released by Entertainment Studios.

In 2021, Roberts wrote and directed the action horror film Resident Evil: Welcome to Raccoon City, a reboot and seventh installment in the Resident Evil franchise, the film was released by Sony Pictures Releasing.

In 2022, Roberts wrote and directed Suicide Bid, a segment in the horror anthology film V/H/S/99, the fifth installment in the V/H/S franchise. It premiered at the 2022 Toronto International Film Festival. The film was released by Shudder and was the most watched film debut on the streaming service.

In 2025, Roberts wrote and directed the horror film Primate. The film revolves around a pet chimpanzee who contracts rabies and goes on a murderous rampage. It stars Johnny Sequoyah, Jessica Alexander and Troy Kotsur and was the opening night film at Fantastic Fest. The film was released theatrically worldwide in 2026 by Paramount Pictures.

== Filmography ==
=== Feature film ===
Year	Title	Director	Writer	Producer	Notes
2001	Sanitarium	Yes	Yes	Yes	Also composer
2004	Hellbreeder	Yes	Yes	Yes	Also composer
2004	Darkhunters	Yes	Yes	Yes	Also composer
2005	Forest of the Damned	Yes	Yes	No	
2006	When Evil Calls	Yes	Yes	No	
2010	F	Yes	Yes	No	
2012	Storage 24	Yes	Yes	No	
2016	The Other Side of the Door	Yes	Yes	No	
2017	47 Meters Down	Yes	Yes	No	
2018	The Strangers: Prey at Night	Yes	No	No	
2019	47 Meters Down: Uncaged	Yes	Yes	Executive	
2021	Resident Evil: Welcome to Raccoon City	Yes	Yes	No	
2022	Play Dead	No	No	Yes	
2023	Baby Blue	No	No	Executive	
2024	The First Omen	2nd unit	No	No	
2025	Primate	Yes	Yes	Executive	
TBA	47 Meters Down: The Wreck	No	Yes	Yes	

=== Short film ===
Year	Title	Director	Writer	Notes
2012	American Werewolf in London	Yes	Yes	Segment of Turn Your Bloody Phone Off
2020	The Plague	Yes	Yes	
2022	Suicide Bid	Yes	Yes	Segment of V/H/S/99

=== Television ===
Year	Title	Director	Writer	Notes
2011	Roadkill	Yes	No	TV movie

=== Acting roles ===
Year	Title	Role	Notes
2001	Sanitarium	Doctor	
2012	American Werewolf in London	Man with Beer	Short film
2023	Sharksploitation	Himself	Documentary
