= Corinne Foxx =

American actress (born 1994)

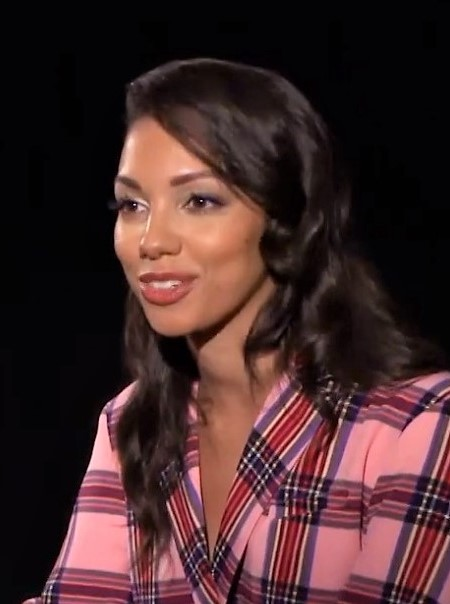
- Born: Corinne Marie Foxx; February 15, 1994 (age 32); Los Angeles, California, U.S.
- Education: University of Southern California
- Occupation: Actress
- Years active: 2000–present
- Spouse: Joe Hooten (m. 2024)
- Parent: Jamie Foxx (father)
- Website: foxxtales.com

Corinne Marie Foxx (born February 15, 1994) is an American actress. She is the daughter of actor and singer Jamie Foxx.

== Early life ==
Foxx was born in 1994. She is the daughter of Jamie Foxx. In high school, she attended Sierra Canyon School where she was a cheerleader and was featured on the cover of American Cheerleader in 2011. She attended the University of Southern California, where she was a member of the class of 2016. She studied public relations, was a cheerleader, and was a member of the Pi Beta Phi sorority. After college, she attended Howard Fine Acting Studio and the American Academy of Dramatic Arts.

== Career ==
At age six, she made a cameo in The Jamie Foxx Show and regularly served as her father's date on the red carpet growing up. She has appeared on Sweet/Vicious and served as Miss Golden Globe in 2016. She was announced as the DJ for the second season of Beat Shazam (on which her father is host) in summer 2018; Foxx has remained on the show since (with the exception of summer 2023 due to her father battling health issues at the time). Foxx had a role in her father's directorial debut, All-Star Weekend, although the film was unreleased and considered indefinitely shelved as of August 2022. She returned to her DJ role on Beat Shazam for its third season debut on May 20, 2019.

She made her formal modeling debut at the Bal des débutantes in November 2014. She began modeling in 2014, and she has represented brands such as Ralph Lauren, Dolce & Gabbana, Kenneth Cole, and Wet 'n' Wild cosmetics. She made her New York Fashion Week debut in 2016, walking for Kanye West's Yeezy line, and walked New York Fashion Week for Sherri Hill's Spring 2018 line in September 2017.

In 2019, she played Sasha in the horror sequel 47 Meters Down: Uncaged.

== Personal life ==
In September 21, 2024, she married Joe Hooten, after a private engagement, in her father's home in Thousand Oaks, California. Despite his health challenges, her father, Jamie Foxx, was in attendance to walk her down the aisle.

== Filmography ==
=== Film ===
Year	Title	Role	Notes
2019	47 Meters Down: Uncaged	Sasha	
2020	Safety	Kaycee Stone	
TBA	All-Star Weekend †	Suyin	Completed

=== Television ===
Year	Title	Role	Notes
2000	The Jamie Foxx Show		Cameo
2013	86th Academy Awards	On-Stage Dancer (with kids)	TV special; "Happy" from Despicable Me 2
2013	David Blaine: Real or Magic	Herself	TV special
2016	Sweet/Vicious	Rachel Abrams	Episode: All Eyez on Me
2018–2022, 2024–present	Beat Shazam	Herself	DJ
2018	Carpool Karaoke	Herself	Episode: Jamie Foxx & Corinne Foxx
2019	Live in Front of a Studio Audience	Thelma	Episode: 'All in the Family' and 'Good Times'
2021	Dad Stop Embarrassing Me!		Executive producer
2022	Dollface	Ruby	

=== Music video appearances ===
Year	Title	Role	Notes
2013	Pharrell Williams: Happy	Dancer (uncredited)	Music video short
