= 47 Meters Down: Uncaged =

2019 film by Johannes Roberts

- Theatrical release poster
- Directed by: Johannes Roberts
- Screenplay by: Johannes Roberts; Ernest Riera
- Produced by: James Harris; Mark Lane; Robert Jones
- Starring: Sophie Nélisse; Corinne Foxx; Brianne Tju; Sistine Stallone; Davi Santos; Khylin Rhambo; Brec Bassinger; Nia Long; John Corbett
- Cinematography: Mark Silk
- Edited by: Martin Brinkler
- Music by: Tomandandy
- Production company: The Fyzz Facility
- Distributed by: Entertainment Studios (North America); Altitude Film Distribution (United Kingdom)
- Release date: August 16, 2019
- Running time: 90 minutes
- Countries: United States; United Kingdom
- Language: English
- Budget: $12 million
- Box office: $47.6 million

47 Meters Down: Uncaged is a 2019 survival horror film directed by Johannes Roberts, and written by Roberts and Ernest Riera. A standalone sequel to 47 Meters Down (2017), none of the cast from the previous film returns. The new cast consists of Sophie Nélisse, Corinne Foxx, Brianne Tju, Sistine Stallone, Davi Santos, Khylin Rhambo, Brec Bassinger, Nia Long and John Corbett. The film also marked the film debuts for Foxx and Stallone. The plot follows a group of teenage girls who scuba dive to a sunken Mayan city, only to be trapped by a group of sharks that are swimming in it.

47 Meters Down: Uncaged was released in the United States on August 16, 2019, by Entertainment Studios. The film grossed $47 million against a $12 million budget and received mixed reviews from critics.

== Plot ==
Mia and her stepsister, Sasha, have just moved to a new school. Another student, Catherine, pushes Mia into the campus pool with Sasha as a bystander. Mia's father Grant learns about the incident and plans a boat ride for the sisters to see the great white sharks, hoping the two will bond. Grant gives Mia a tooth of a great white shark he found and recounts when Mia used to scuba dive with him.

On the day of the boat ride, Mia is shocked to see that Catherine and her friends are also there for the tour. Sasha's friends Alexa and Nicole arrive and tempt them both to go to a secret place with them. The girls get in Alexa's car and have a fun time together at the secret lagoon. Alexa reveals that the lagoon has an entrance to a submerged Mayan city where Grant and his two assistants, Carl and Alexa's boyfriend, Ben are working to prepare for a visit from a group of archaeologists the following week. After finding scuba gear, Nicole persuades the girls to dive through the city, eventually reaching an ancient sacrificial chamber. They encounter a cavefish, and Nicole accidentally knocks over a stone column, causing a chain reaction of collapses.

The girls become separated by the silt until Mia and Alexa find Ben, who is suddenly devoured by a shark and drops the guideline. The girls find each other and are chased by a shark into a tunnel, causing a cave-in to the lagoon's entrance. The girls decide to go back for the guideline but encounter a shark forcing the girls to swim deeper into the city until they reach an air pocket. Mia hears music in the water and leaves the girls behind in an attempt to get help. Elsewhere, Carl, who is listening to the music, is later attacked and killed by a shark. Mia eventually finds his body, and Grant saves her. The two reunite with the other girls, who came looking for her. They realize the shark is blind, having evolved within the caves, and they are able to distract the shark with sounds and make their escape. The group surfaces at a clearing where a pulley system ascender is set in place. However, two sharks come to the surface, and Nicole panics. She attempts to climb up the rope as Alexa is going up, inadvertently causing much of the rope and Alexa to fall back into the water. Nicole does climb up to reach an entrance, but instead she holds a loose rock, loses her grip, and also falls back, then she is ripped apart and devoured in a feeding frenzy by two sharks.

Grant explains that the only way out is to swim back down even deeper in order to find another exit, which will let them come out in the ocean, but is killed by a shark moments later. Mia, Sasha, and Alexa swim into the caves alone, eventually coming upon a strong current that catches Sasha and separates her from the others. Alexa makes it to the other entrance but is attacked by one of the sharks, and Mia is dragged into the current. Alexa escapes the shark by taking off her air tank but eventually drowns. Mia reunites with Sasha at the lower current, and they swim into a newly discovered cave. At the end of the cave, they find a crevice that leads to the surface, but a shark appears and attacks them. Climbing up the narrow crevice, both girls alternatively get caught in the tight space and must abandon their now empty air tanks to escape.

At the surface, they see a tour boat and start swimming towards it until they realize it is chumming the water to attract sharks. Mia and Sasha get the tourists' attention as they are attacked by the sharks. While Mia makes it onto the boat, Sasha is grabbed by a shark. Mia jumps back into the water and shoots the shark with a flare gun, freeing Sasha. Sasha reaches the boat, but Mia is dragged into the water by another shark. She escapes by stabbing the shark's eye with the tooth given to her by Grant. Mia swims to the boat and reunites with Sasha as a shocked Catherine watches the boat's staff tend to their wounds.

== Cast ==
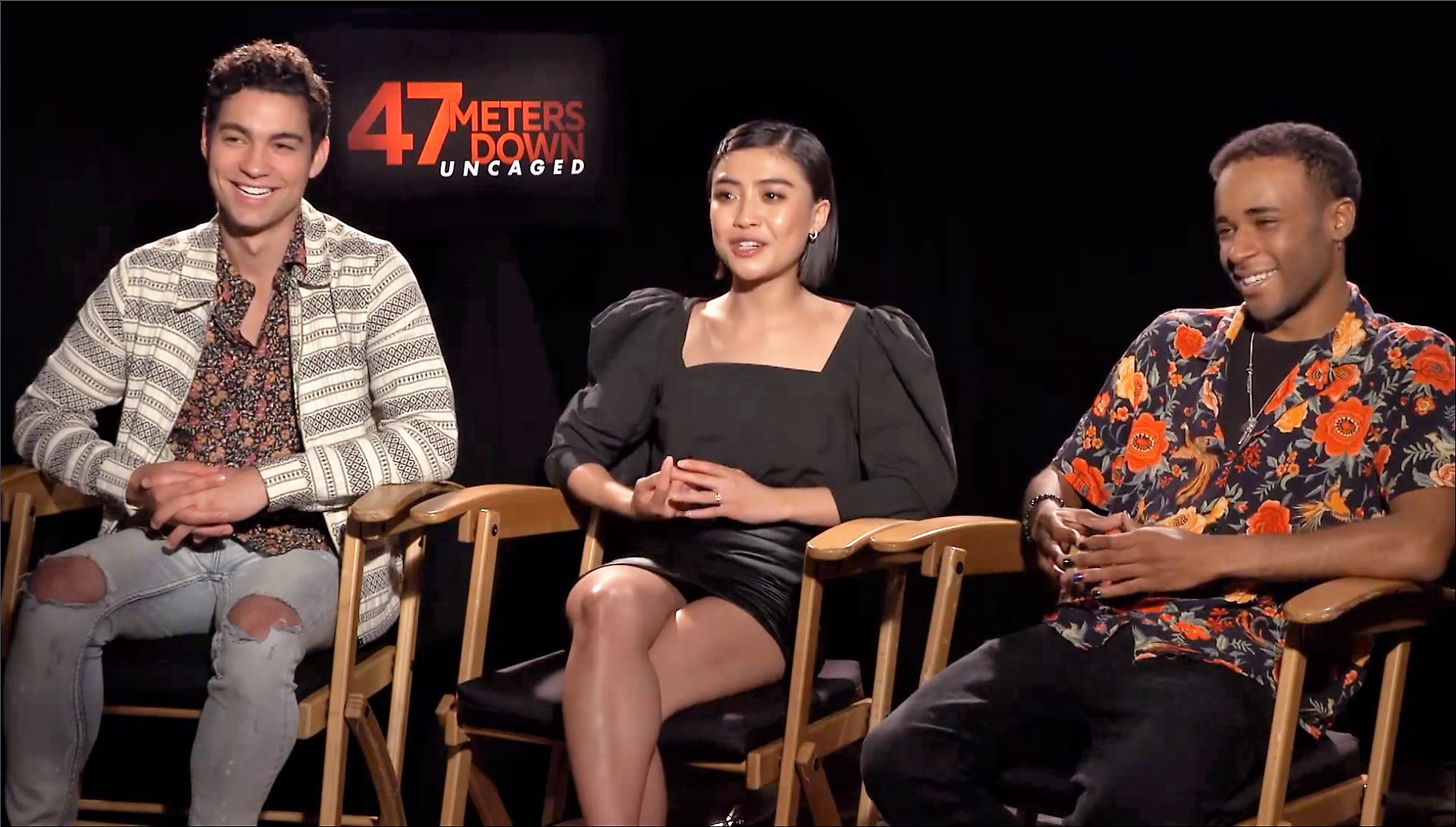
Left to right: Davi Santos, Brianne Tju, Khylin Rhambo discuss the film

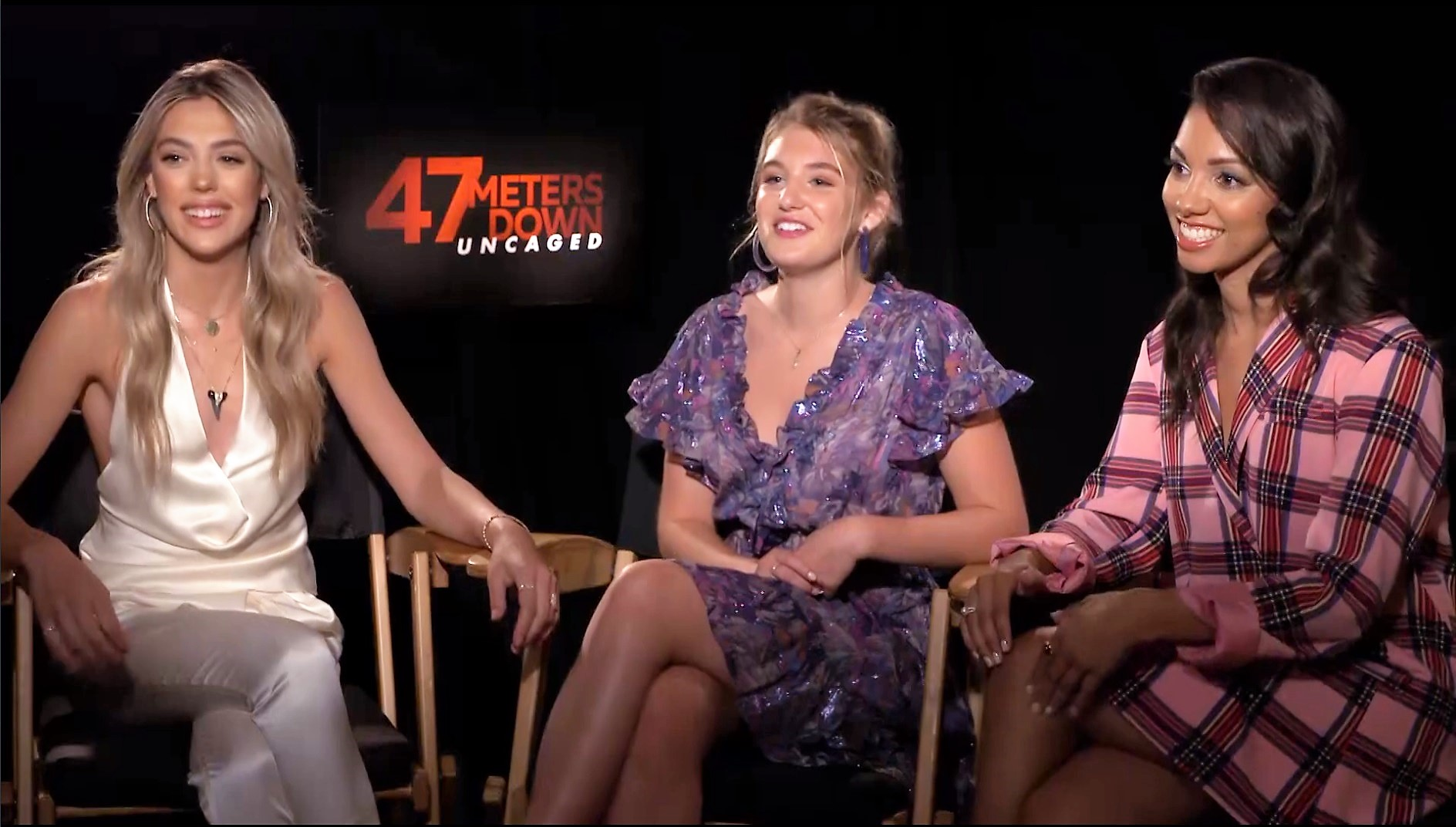
Left to right: Sistine Stallone, Sophie Nélisse, Corinne Foxx discuss the film

- Sophie Nélisse as Mia
- Corinne Foxx as Sasha
- Brianne Tju as Alexa
- Sistine Stallone as Nicole
- Davi Santos as Ben
- Khylin Rhambo as Carl
- Brec Bassinger as Catherine
- John Corbett as Grant
- Nia Long as Jennifer

== Production ==
=== Development ===
In September 2017, it was announced that production studio The Fyzz Facility was working on a sequel to 47 Meters Down, titled 48 Meters Down. Johannes Roberts returned as director, and again co-wrote the script with Ernest Riera. James Harris and Mark Lane produced the film, as they did the first, and were joined by Robert Jones.

The sequel takes place in Mexico, and centers around a group of young women who decide to explore some hidden underwater ruins located off the beaten trail. Production was overseen by Altitude Film Sales, and potential buyers were sought in Toronto.

In August 2018, a teaser trailer for the film was released, with a new official title 47 Meters Down: The Next Chapter, before filming had begun. By December of the same year, the film had been re-titled 47 Meters Down: Uncaged.

Tomandandy reteamed with director Roberts to compose 47 Meters Down: Uncaged. Varèse Sarabande Records released the soundtrack.

=== Filming ===
Principal photography for the film took place at Pinewood Indomina Studios, Dominican Republic, the Underwater Studio in Basildon and Pinewood Studios, Buckinghamshire, from December 2018 to February 2019.

== Release ==
Entertainment Studios handled distribution for the film, and initially set the release for June 28, 2019. In February 2019, it was announced the release date had been pushed back to August 16, 2019, in order to avoid competition with Annabelle Comes Home.

Release dates for other countries include August 23 (Indonesia), August 28 (South Korea), August 29 (Portugal, Singapore), August 30 (India), September 26 (Chile, Peru), October 10 (Germany) and November 20 (Brazil). The movie was released direct to DVD in the UK on February 3, 2020, and added to Netflix in April 2020, without a theatrical release in the country.

== Reception ==
=== Box office ===
47 Meters Down grossed $22.3 million in the United States and Canada, and $25.3 million in other territories, for a worldwide total of $47.6 million.

In the United States and Canada, the film was released alongside Blinded by the Light, Where'd You Go, Bernadette and Good Boys, and was projected to gross $11–14 million from 2,853 theaters in its opening weekend. It made $3.2 million on its first day, including $516,000 from Thursday night previews. The film went on to debut to $8.4 million, down from the original's $11.2 million, and finishing sixth. The film dropped 54% in its second weekend to $3.9 million, finishing 11th.

=== Critical response ===
On Rotten Tomatoes, the film holds an approval rating of 45% based on 87 reviews, with an average rating of 4.6/10. The website's critical consensus reads, "47 Meters Down: Uncaged may not be as ruthlessly efficient as its finned villains, but fans of shark peril thrillers should find it just chummy enough." Metacritic assigned the film a weighted average score of 43 out of 100, based on 17 critics, indicating "mixed or average" reviews. Audiences surveyed by CinemaScore gave the film an average grade of "C+" on an A+ to F scale, while those polled at PostTrak gave it an average 2.5 out of 5 stars and a 52% "definite recommend".

== Sequel ==
In February 2020, Roberts announced that a third 47 Meters Down movie was in early development. Stating that the next film is "definitely" happening, citing the second movie's financial successes, the filmmaker acknowledged that while he wouldn't be directing the project he is involved in its realization. By May 2024, a third film was officially announced with the title 47 Meters Down: The Wreck. Directed by Patrick Lussier from a script co-authored by Johannes Roberts and Ernest Riera; the plot was stated to revolve around a father who strives to build a relationship with his estranged daughter, only for catastrophe to befall their deep sea dive to a shipwreck. James Harris, Mark Lane, and Johannes Roberts will serve as producers with the project intended to be a joint-venture production between Allen Media Group Motion Pictures, Tea Shop Productions, and FilmNation Entertainment with distribution rights shopped around at the Cannes Film Festival. Principal photography commenced in the fall of 2024.
