= Brianne Tju =

American actress

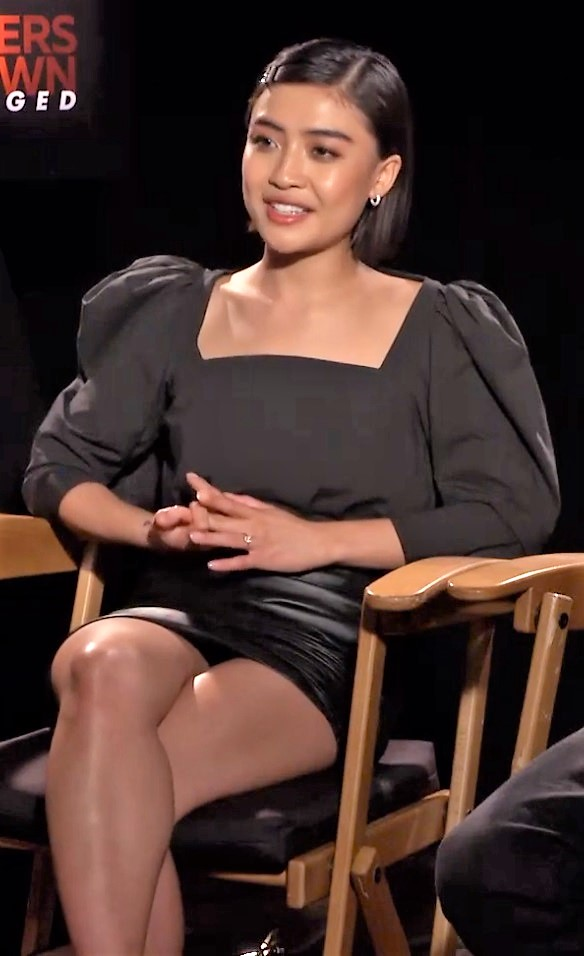
- Tju in 2019
- Born: June 14, 1998 (age 28); Chino Hills, California, U.S.
- Occupation: Actress
- Years active: 2007–present
- Relatives: Haley Tju (sister)

Brianne Tju (/ˈtʃuː/) is an American actress. She is known for her roles as Riley Marra in the MTV series Scream (2015), Alex Portnoy in the Hulu series Light as a Feather (2018–2019), Alexa in 47 Meters Down: Uncaged (2019), and Margot in the Prime Video series I Know What You Did Last Summer (2021).

== Life and career ==
Tju was born and raised in Chino Hills, California. She graduated from Ruben S. Ayala High School and currently undergoes her studies at the California State University, Fullerton. She is the older sister of actress Haley Tju. She is of Chinese and Indonesian heritage.

In 2007, Tju made her television acting debut in the Disney Channel series Cory in the House. Following on from her first role, Tju won other roles on a variety of TV shows and films including Liv and Maddie, Pass the Light, Grey's Anatomy, A.P. Bio and 9-1-1.

In 2015, Tju starred in the recurring role of Riley Marra on the MTV slasher television series Scream.

On June 4, 2018, it was announced that Tju had been cast in the series regular role of Alex Portnoy on the Hulu series Light as a Feather.

Tju co-starred in the survival horror film 47 Meters Down: Uncaged, which was released in theaters on August 16, 2019.

== Filmography ==
=== Film ===
Year	Title	Role	Notes
2015	Pass the Light	Mary Jane	
2019	47 Meters Down: Uncaged	Alexa	
2022	Unhuman	Ever	
2022	Gone in the Night	Greta	
2022	Three Months	Dara	
2024	Uglies	Shay	

=== Television ===
Year	Title	Role	Notes
2007–2008	Cory in the House	Haley	Recurring role (season 2); 5 episodes
2010	Sons of Tucson	Robin	Episode: "The Debate Trip"
2010–2011	Make It or Break It	Genji Cho	Recurring role (seasons 1–2); 4 episodes
2011	The Haunting Hour: The Series	Jessica Chen	Episode: "Bad Feng Shui"
2012	So Random!	Cassy	2 episodes
2013	Save Me	Riley	3 episodes
2013–2014	See Dad Run	Taylor	Recurring role (seasons 2–3); 7 episodes
2014–2016	Liv and Maddie	Alex	Recurring role (seasons 2–3); 4 episodes
2015	The Thundermans	Joanie	Episode: "It’s Not What You Link"
2015	Scream	Riley Marra	3 episodes
2016	Grey's Anatomy	Stacy	Episode: "Trigger Happy"
2017	Famous in Love	Xu YiFei	2 episodes
2017	Life After First Failure	Jasmine	Main role
2018	9-1-1	Hannah	Episode: "Worst Day Ever"
2018	A.P. Bio	Dallas	Episode: "Drenching Dallas"
2018–2019	Light as a Feather	Alex Portnoy	Main role
2019	iZombie	Amy	Episode: "Death Moves Pretty Fast"
2020	Chicago PD	Mira Davis	Episode: "I Was Here"
2021	I Know What You Did Last Summer	Margot	Main role
2022	High School	Ali	Main role

== Awards and nominations ==
Year	Award	Category	Work	Result	Refs
2019	Daytime Emmy Awards	Outstanding Supporting Actress in a Digital Daytime Drama Series	Light as a Feather	Nominated	
2020	Daytime Emmy Awards	Outstanding Principal Performance in a Daytime Program	Light as a Feather	Nominated	
