= Patrick Lussier =

Canadian-American film director, screenwriter and film editor

- Born: Vancouver, British Columbia, Canada
- Occupations: Director, cinematographer
- Years active: 1989–present

Patrick Lussier is a Canadian-American filmmaker and editor.

== Early life ==
Lussier was born in Vancouver, British Columbia.

== Career ==
Lussier was nominated at the Annual Gemini Awards for Best Picture Editing in a Dramatic Program or Series for Adrift in 1994 and Heads in 1995. In 1996, he edited the Doctor Who television film.

Lussier has worked as a film editor on most of director Wes Craven's latter films, including Wes Craven's New Nightmare, Vampire in Brooklyn, Red Eye, and the first three installments in the Scream film series. He made his directorial debut with The Prophecy 3: The Ascent, and co-wrote and directed the Craven-produced Dracula 2000. He also directed White Noise: The Light, which was a financial failure in spite of positive critical reception. He returned to editing on the English-language remake of The Eye starring Jessica Alba, on which he was also a visual consultant, and has also been credited as a visual consultant on Whisper and Darkness Falls amongst others.

Lussier directed the 2009 remake of My Bloody Valentine for Lionsgate Films, written by Zane Smith and Todd Farmer. On September 19, 2009, Lussier signed on to write and direct Halloween III, the second sequel to Rob Zombie's 2007 reboot of the Halloween franchise, originally scheduled for 2011 but later delayed before ultimately being cancelled. In 2010, Lussier directed the supernatural road action film Drive Angry, released on February 25, 2011. He co-wrote the screenplay with his previous collaborator Todd Farmer, of My Bloody Valentine 3D. Lussier and screenwriter Laeta Kalogridis are founding members and creative consultants for Skydance Media. The duo wrote and co-produced the fifth film in the long-running Terminator series, Terminator Genisys, released in 2015, and served as consultants for Mission: Impossible – Rogue Nation.

In 2016, Lussier returned to the Scream franchise to direct the second season finale for the MTV television series adaptation "When a Stranger Calls". In 2018, Lussier directed and co-produced the Hulu/Blumhouse anthology film "Flesh & Blood" for their new Into the Dark series. In 2019, he directed an episode of the US series The Purge for season 2.

== Filmography ==
=== Film ===
Year	Title	Director	Writer	Editor
2000	The Prophecy 3: The Ascent	Yes	No	No
2000	Dracula 2000	Yes	Story	Yes
2003	Dracula II: Ascension	Yes	Yes	No
2005	Dracula III: Legacy	Yes	Yes	No
2007	White Noise: The Light	Yes	No	Yes
2009	My Bloody Valentine 3D	Yes	No	Yes
2011	Drive Angry	Yes	Yes	Yes
2015	Terminator Genisys	No	Yes	No
2019	Trick	Yes	No	No
2022	Play Dead	Yes	No	No
2024	Aftermath	Yes	No	No
TBA	47 Meters Down: The Wreck	Yes	No	No

=== Television ===
Year	Title	Episode
2016	Scream	"When a Stranger Calls"
2018	Into the Dark	"Flesh & Blood"
2019	The Purge	"Before the Sirens"

=== Editor only ===
Year	Title	Notes
1989-91	MacGyver	16 episodes
1991	Mom P.I.	5 episodes
1992	Nightmare Cafe	4 episodes
1992-93	The Odyssey	6 episodes
1993	Highlander: The Series	3 episodes
1994	Wes Craven's New Nightmare	
1995	Galaxis	
1995	Vampire in Brooklyn	
1996	D3: The Mighty Ducks	
1996	Doctor Who	TV movie
1996	Scream	
1997	Mimic	
1997	Scream 2	
1998	Halloween H20: 20 Years Later	
1999	Music of the Heart	
2000	Scream 3	
2003	My Boss's Daughter	
2005	Cursed	
2005	Red Eye	
2008	The Eye	
2011	Apollo 18	

=== Actor ===
Year	Title	Notes
2011	Scream: The Inside Story	Documentary film, himself
2011	Still Screaming: The Ultimate Scary Movie Retrospective	Documentary film, himself
