= King of the Beasts =

The title King of the Beasts may refer to:

- The lion
- Simba: King of the Beasts (1928), an American documentary film
- Sacrificial Princess and the King of Beasts (2015), a Japanese manga
- King of Beasts (2018), an American documentary

== See also ==
- King Kong, a fictional giant ape
- Kaido, a character from the manga One Piece
- Aslan, a character from C.S. Lewis's Chronicles of Narnia
