= Hard Knocks =

Hard Knocks may refer to:

== Films ==
- Hard Knocks (1924), a comedy short by James Parrott
- Hard Knocks (1979 film), a 1979 American film
- Hard Knocks (1980 film), a 1980 Australian film starring Tracy Mann
- Hard Knocks: The Chris Benoit Story, a DVD about the professional wrestler

== Music ==
- Hard Knocks (album), a 2010 album by Joe Cocker
- Hard Knocks, a hip hop group on Wild Pitch Records
- "Hard Knocks", a song by Snoop Dogg and Dr. Dre from Missionary, 2024
- "Hardknock", a song by Joey Badass from 1999

== Television ==
- Hard Knocks (1987 TV series), an American sitcom featuring Bill Maher
- Hard Knocks (2001 TV series), an American football documentary program produced by NFL Films for HBO
- "Hard Knocks" (Fantastic Four episode)

== See also ==
- School of Hard Knocks, an idiomatic phrase for the education one gets from life
- The Choir of Hard Knocks, a choir consisting of homeless and disadvantaged people in Melbourne, Australia
- Hard Knock Life (disambiguation)
