= Michael Christian =

Michael Christian may refer to:

- Michael Christian (footballer), Australian rules footballer and media personality
- Michael Christian (actor), American actor
- Mike Christian, Australian radio presenter
- Mike Christian (politician), member of the Oklahoma House of Representatives
