= Shark Attack 3 =

- Official DVD cover
- Directed by: David Worth
- Written by: Scott Devine; William Hooke
- Produced by: Boaz Davidson; Danny Lerner; David Varod
- Starring: John Barrowman; Ryan Cutrona; Jenny McShane; Bashar Rahal; George Stanchev
- Edited by: Kristopher Lease
- Music by: Bill Wandel
- Production company: Nu Image Films
- Distributed by: VIVA Films (Philippines); Star Cinema (Philippines)
- Release dates: November 22, 2002 (U.S.); February 6, 2003 (Philippines)
- Running time: 99 minutes
- Countries: United States; Philippines
- Language: English

Shark Attack 3 is a 2002 horror film is the second sequel to Shark Attack, released in 2002 direct-to-video. The film is notable for featuring John Barrowman, who later found fame in popular shows such as Doctor Who and Torchwood. Barrowman has said in an interview on Friday Night with Jonathan Ross that he only did the film for the money (on QI, he claimed it paid for his first house), and was rather embarrassed when a clip from the film was shown. Actress Jenny McShane from the first Shark Attack film has a starring role, albeit as a completely different character.

When two researchers discover a colossal shark's tooth off the Mexican coast their fears are realized - the extinct aquatic predator Megalodon, which was thought to be extinct, is still alive and feeding on anything that crosses its path. The film is also notable because certain clips from it have become popular internet memes due to its unconvincing special effects, size-changing shark, and bizarre dialogue.

== Plot ==
A group of divers are installing a power cable at the bottom of the Pacific Ocean, when a shark swims up and kills one of them. Six months later, lifeguard Ben Carpenter and his partner Esai drive out to sea to catch some lobster. While diving, Ben finds a broken power cable with a large shark tooth stuck in it. After he pulls out the tooth, he is caught by two other divers, and soon goes back to land. Later he posts a description of the tooth online, but he does not find a matching shark tooth on the internet. Cataline "Cat" Stone gets the message, finds him and looks at the tooth. She believes it to come from a Megalodon.

Ben meets with his friend Chuck Rampart, who tells him he intends to take a look at the broken power cable. Ben tells him about the shark. Later, the animal kills two people who use a waterslide in the middle of the night. The next day Cat and her partners go out on a boat to find and tag the Megalodon, which is revealed only to be a 15 ft (4.6 m) juvenile. The shark shows up and smashes into their boat. Davis films it while Cat hooks a camera onto the sharks dorsal fin. The Megalodon leaves and later kills a man who is playing frisbee on the beach with his dog. Ben finds the man's severed leg and informs Cat about the attack; she in turn tells him about the Megalodon, additionally saying that it's a miniature version of the beast. Angry that she lied to him, he leaves.

The next day Ben, Cat, Davis and another partner go out to kill the shark, which they find out is heading toward a nearby resort. They manage to drive it back out to sea, where it kills several more people. Ben tries to get his boss, Luis Ruiz, to close the beaches. Ruiz says he will, and then tells Ben to kill the Megalodon.

The crew goes back out to sea to kill the shark for good. Ben stabs the animal, which in turn begins ramming the boat, knocking Davis out cold. Cat goes into the cabin to get her shotgun, but the Megalodon bursts into the boat, trying to eat her. Ben comes to her aid, beating the shark with a bat. Cat grabs her gun and shoots the shark, killing it. Afterwards, Esai arrives on his speedboat, when suddenly, the first shark's enraged mother, a large 60 ft (18 m) adult Megalodon, surfaces and swallows him and his boat whole. The shark then capsizes the boat, and swallows Davis and his friend in one bite. Ben and Cat are rescued by a helicopter and leave. Ben shows Ruiz the shark tooth, but his boss still refuses to close the beaches. Later Ben and Cat go over to Chuck's house, loading a torpedo into Chuck's midget submarine.

The next day, Ben and Chuck go down in the submarine. The Megalodon attacks a yacht, slamming into it a couple of times, knocking several people overboard. They escape to two large safety rafts. Ruiz steals a woman's life jacket and jumps off the yacht, only to be swallowed whole by the shark, as is one of the rafts. Tolley attempts to escape on a jet ski, but he ends up driving straight into the Megalodon's wide open jaw. Chuck then goes into the water and tags the shark. Ben eventually launches the torpedo, which succeeds in destroying the creature. Ben swims to the surface with Chuck and climbs into the raft. They all celebrate their success, but elsewhere, another Megalodon is shown swimming near a shore, hinting that there might be more of these prehistoric creatures.

== Cast ==
- John Barrowman as Ben Carpenter
- Jenny McShane as Cataline Stone
- Ryan Cutrona as Chuck Rampart
- Bashar Rahal as Luis Ruiz
- George Stanchev as Esai / "Sy"
- Harry Anichkin as Mr. Tolley
- Rosi Chernogorova as Sherry
- Plamen Zahov as Hector
- Ivo Tonchev as Ramirez
- Georgio Borissov as Raymond
- Jordan Karadjov as "Chimpy"
- Yavor Ralinov as Phillip
- Nikolay Sotirov as Davis
- Atanas Srebrev as Freidman
- Miroslav Marinov as Paul
- Velizar Peev as Harry
- Atanas Georgiev as Scott
- Malina Georgieva as Gina
- Simeon Vladov as Chris

== Reception ==
The film received negative reviews. On Rotten Tomatoes it has an approval rating of 20% based on reviews from 5 critics.

Scott Weinberg of efilmcritic.com writes: "The awfulness is one thing; the plagiarism is something else" and suggested the film makers plagiarized the novel Meg: A Novel of Deep Terror. Weinberg says he got a single laugh from the terrible dialog and that "Shark Attack 3 is simply inept in every way".

== Internet meme ==
- A clip showing the shark attacking the yacht has received over 60 million views on YouTube.
- A video on YouTube entitled "That Famous Line" shows a scene from the film, in which John Barrowman's character proposes to Jenny McShane's character "What do you say I take you home and eat your pussy?" and has received over two million views. In an interview on Jonathan Ross, Barrowman said that the director asked him to improvise a line in order to make McShane laugh and he came up with it, and was surprised that it was kept in the film when he watched with his nephews for the first time. McShane gave no reaction to Barrowman's line. Director David Worth said he had kept the line in the film because he found it hilarious.

== See also ==
- Shark Attack
- Shark Attack 2
- Shark Zone
- Megalodon
- Mega Shark Versus Giant Octopus
- Mega Shark Versus Mecha Shark
