= Joe Rossi =

Joe Rossi may refer to:

- Joe Rossi (politician) (born 1948), member of the South Australian House of Assembly
- Joe Rossi (baseball) (1921–1999), American baseball player
- Joe Rossi (Peyton Place), a character in Peyton Place
- Joe Rossi (American football) (born 1979), American football coach
