= David Worth (filmmaker) =

American cinematographer and film director (1940–2026)

- Born: March 2, 1940; Los Angeles, California, U.S.
- Died: September 7, 2026 (aged 86)
- Occupations: Cinematographer; director; screenwriter
- Years active: 1963–2026

David Worth (March 2, 1940 – September 7, 2026) was an American film director, screenwriter and cinematographer. He contributed as cinematographer to more than 20 films, including Bloodsport, Any Which Way You Can and Bronco Billy. Worth also directed films including Warrior of the Lost World, Lady Dragon and Hard Knocks while also doing a few films with pseudonyms such as Sven Conrad and Jim Hastings. He co-directed the 1989 film Kickboxer, with Mark DiSàlle. Worth died on September 7, 2026, at the age of 86.

== Filmography ==
- Poor Pretty Eddie (1975)
- How Sweet It Is! (1978) (as Sven Conrad)
- Frat House (1979) (as Sven Conrad)
- Hard Knocks (1979)
- Pink Champagne (1979) (as Sven Conrad)
- Body Magic (1982) (as Sven Conrad)
- Doing It! (1982) (as Sven Conrad)
- Warrior of the Lost World (1983)
- Soldier's Revenge (1986)
- Kickboxer (1989)
- Lady Dragon (1992)
- Lady Dragon 2 (1993)
- Chain of Command (1994) (TV / Direct-to-video)
- American Tigers (1996)
- True Vengeance (1997)
- I Might Even Love You (1998)
- The Prophet's Game (2000)
- Shark Attack 2 (2000)
- Shark Attack 3 (2002)
- Fists of Rage (2006)
- Honor (2006)
- Hazard Jack (2014)
- House at the End of the Drive (2014)
