= Yū Tomofuji =

Japanese manga artist

Yu Tomofuji
- 友藤 結
- Occupation: Mangaka
- Writing career
- Period: 2009–present
- Notable work: Sacrificial Princess and the King of Beasts
- Notable awards: 386th HMC Effort Award; 52th Big Challenge Award: Honorable Mention & Special Jury Award; 36th Hakusensha Athena Newcomers Award: Outstanding Debutant Award
- Website: soel.jugem.jp

Yū Tomofuji (友藤 結) is a Japanese manga artist from Hokkaido.

== Career ==
In July 2008, she won the 386th HMC Effort Award for Crepe Sucré (クレープ・シュクレ, Kurēpu shukure; 'Sweet Crepe'). The following year, she received an Honorable Mention and a Special Jury Prize at the 52nd Big Challenge Award for The World We Meguru. She made her debut with Children Dream of Adults, published in the August 1, 2009 issue of The Hana to Yume. Since then, she has been active in Hakusensha's manga magazines Hana to Yume and The Hana to Yume. In 2011, she won the Debut Excellence Award at the 36th Hakusensha Athena Newcomer Award for Flowers Blooming in the Shadows.

From issue 23 of 2015 to issue 22 of 2020, the high fantasy series Sacrificial Princess and the King of Beasts was serialized in Hana to Yume. She has been serializing The Guardian of the Holy Priestess (Shializ) in Hana to Yume since the combined issue 10/11 of 2021 (April).

On April 18, 2025, Tomofuji published a one-shot manga titled Mahō no Nai Sekai (魔法のない世界; lit. 'A World Without Magic') in the combined 10th and 11th issue of Hana to Yume.

== Works ==
- 友. 藤. 結. (January 19, 2011). Kage Ni Saku Hana (影に咲く花). ISBN 978-4-592-19212-1.
- 友. 藤. 結. (October 20, 2011). Ikuseisō No Yoru O Koe (幾星霜の夜を越え). ISBN 978-4-592-19206-0.
- 友. 藤. 結. (November 20, 2012). Urufuru Mūn (ウルフル・ムーン). ISBN 978-4-592-19420-0.
- Hoshifururu Ma Kiba! (星降るまきば!). June 20, 2013. ISBN 978-4-592-19424-8.
- Sacrificial Princess and the King of Beasts
- Sacrificial Princess and the King of Beasts Heir: White Rabbit and the Prince of Beasts
- Hijiri Miko no Gādian (聖巫女の守護者).;3 volumes

No.	Release date	ISBN
1	October 20, 2021	978-4-592-22406-8
2	March 18, 2022	978-4-592-22407-5
3	June 20, 2022	978-4-592-22408-2

- Futatsu no Geshupensuto (ふたつのゲシュペンスト; 2 volumes)

No.	Release date	ISBN
1	January 20, 2023	978-4-592-22878-3
2	December 19, 2025	978-4-592-23108-0
