= Warrior of the Lost World =

1983 film by David Worth

- Theatrical release poster
- Directed by: David Worth
- Written by: David Worth
- Produced by: Roberto Bessi; Frank Hildebrand; Tim Ubels; Ben Moerman; Ben Keizer
- Starring: Robert Ginty; Persis Khambatta; Donald Pleasence; Fred Williamson; Harrison Mueller Sr. Laura Nucci
- Cinematography: Giancarlo Ferrando
- Edited by: Cesare D'Amico
- Music by: Daniele Patucchi
- Distributed by: Visto International Inc.
- Release date: September 1985 (U.S.)
- Running time: 92 minutes
- Countries: Italy, United States
- Language: English
- Budget: US$500,000

Warrior of the Lost World (also known as Mad Rider) is a 1983 Italian-American post-apocalyptic science fiction film written and directed by David Worth and starring Robert Ginty, Persis Khambatta, and Donald Pleasence. It was created and first released in Italy under the title Il Giustiziere della terra perduta ("Vigilante of the Lost Earth") in 1983 during the wide popularity of the Mad Max films and many subsequent post-apocalyptic films of the 1980s. Later the film was given the alternate Italian title I predatori dell'anno Omega ("Raiders of the Omega Year") for VHS and television markets.

== Plot ==
The Rider arrives on his advanced motorcycle equipped with an artificial intelligence computer called Einstein. He crashes but manages to pass through the "wall of illusion" where he is brought back to health by the Enlightened Elders. They have chosen him to lead their fight against the evil Omega, an Orwellian state run by the evil Prossor. The Elders are allied with a resistance movement called the Outsiders. The Rider first helps Nastasia and the other Outsiders by rescuing McWayne, Nastasia's father and leader of the Outsiders. While the Rider and McWayne successfully escape, Nastasia is captured and subjected to brainwashing by Prossor.

The Rider gains acceptance from various Marginals (Amazons, martial artists, truckers, punks, soldiers, Omega defectors) by winning in the ritual brawl which determines who is the strongest. The Rider and the Outsiders launch their final attack on Prossor's regime, but are intercepted by the Omegas and a giant armored truck called Megaweapon. As the rebels destroy the Omega patrols with their cars (Ford Taunus TCs), helicopters, and tankers, the Rider manages to destroy Megaweapon by short circuiting it, but not before his supersonic speedcycle is crushed under the truck's wheels. The Rider and McWayne storm Prossor's headquarters where they face the dictator himself and a brainwashed Nastasia. She wounds the Rider, but when ordered to kill her father, she rebels, turning on Prossor and shooting him instead. The Omega have been overthrown, and the Outsiders and Marginals celebrate, as the Rider prepares to move on with his repaired speedcycle.

In a twist, it is revealed that the man Nastasia shot was actually a cyborg clone. The real Prossor is still alive, flying away with an unnamed traitor of the New Way (Fred Williamson), plotting revenge against the "animals" that defeated him.

== Cast ==
- Robert Ginty as The Rider
- Persis Khambatta as Nastasia
- Donald Pleasence as Prossor
- Fred Williamson as Henchman
- Harrison Muller Sr. as McWayne
- Philip Dallas as Elder
- Laura Nucci as Elder
- Vinicio Ricchi as Elder (credited as Vinicio Recchi)
- Geretta Geretta as Amazon (credited as Janna Ryan)
- Consuelo Marcaccini as Amazon

== Production ==
Edward Sarlui pre-sold the movie using a poster of a masked biker in a futuristic landscape before a script had been written or a cast assembled with the intent of using the pre-sales to produce the film. After serving as a director of photography on two Clint Eastwood films, David Worth hoped to parlay this into a directing job and so pitched his own project which he referred to as "High Plains Drifter on a motorcycle" to little success. Worth was introduced to Sarlui through Sandy Howard and upon Sarlui's review of the script he approved the project with Worth directing as long as the script was set in the future. Robert Ginty was cast as The Rider as Worth had been impressed with his performance in The Exterminator.

== Mystery Science Theater 3000 ==
Warrior of the Lost World featured in the first episode of the fifth season of Mystery Science Theater 3000 (MST3K). A recurring joke is that the crew can't remember the lead actor Robert Ginty's name, referring to him as "the Paper Chase guy." The crew also find the voice of the speedcycle's display screen so irritating that they cheer when it is destroyed by Megaweapon, referring to Megaweapon onwards as "the only good thing in this movie" and even giving Megaweapon (voiced by Michael J. Nelson) a phone call after watching the film. According to Mary Jo Pehl, a writer and later cast member of the show, Ginty is "assisted and outacted by his supersonic speedcycle," and his kiss with Persis Khambatta in the climactic scene is "guaranteed to traumatize even the most-hardened maker-outer."

The Warrior of the Lost World episode is a favorite of MST3K fans: It finished #27 out of 177 in a poll of MST3K Season 11 Kickstarter backers. Writer Jim Vorel holds the episode in lower esteem than the fans, ranking it #98 (out of 191 total MST3K episodes). Vorel believes star Robert Ginty has the most "purely punchable face in MST3k history" and that "the film is so dull, fuzzy and unengaging."

The MST3K version of the film was released on DVD by Shout Factory on July 20, 2010, as part of the Volume XVI box set; also included in the set were The Corpse Vanishes (episode #105), Santa Claus (episode #521), and Night of the Blood Beast (episode #701). The DVD includes an interview with director David Worth, who discusses the making of the film, which was his directorial debut. Worth previously appeared at the first ConventioCon ExpoFest-A-Rama in 1994, and describes himself as a fan of the show.
