= Poor Pretty Eddie =

1975 film

- Original film poster
- Directed by: David Worth; Richard Robinson
- Starring: Leslie Uggams; Shelley Winters; Michael Christian
- Production companies: Artaxerxes Productions; Michael Thevis Enterprises
- Release date: 1975
- Running time: 86 minutes
- Country: United States
- Language: English

Poor Pretty Eddie is a 1975 American film starring Leslie Uggams, Shelley Winters and Michael Christian. Made on a relatively small budget, it is known for having an atypical narrative and directorial style, which combines elements of horror, exploitation film making and Southern gothic. It has subsequently become popular in cult and B movie circles.

== Plot ==
Liz Wetherly is a popular black singer in need of a break from her hectic schedule. When her car breaks down, she ends up stuck in a remote southern town that‘s been left for dead “ever since they put in the interstate.”

She is forced to spend the night at “Bertha’s Oasis”, a rundown lodge that serves as the bizarre fiefdom of an overweight ex-burlesque star who lords over her much younger boyfriend, Eddie, and a cast of equally-strange townsfolk. Eddie fancies himself a singer on par with Elvis, and expects Wetherly to make him famous. But things turn ugly for Wetherly, who endures rape and abuse at the hands of her captors, before culminating in her bloody revenge on the “rednecks” that terrorized her.

== Cast ==
- Leslie Uggams as Liz Wetherly
- Shelley Winters as Bertha
- Michael Christian as Eddie Collins
- Slim Pickens as Sheriff Orville
- Dub Taylor as Justice of The Peace Floyd
- Ted Cassidy as Keno

== Background ==
Most of the individuals involved in the production of Poor Pretty Eddie were, at the time, nominally employed in the world of adult films, with the picture representing an opportunity to appear in mainstream films. According to the extensive liner notes packaged with the film's DVD, backing was secured from Michael Thevis, an Atlanta-based businessman commonly known as “The King of Pornography” whose other businesses included a chain of sex shops, a record company, and the manufacture of peep show booths. Thevis used the production to launder money he had made through dealings with various Mafia figures, which then attracted the attention of the FBI. Shortly after the film's production, Thevis was jailed on an assortment of charges and, following a prison escape in 1978, was placed on the FBI’s most-wanted list.

The movie's script, loosely based on the Jean Genet play The Balcony, was the work of television writer B. W. Sandefur, who also wrote for such shows as Barnaby Jones, Little House on the Prairie and Charlie's Angels.

The film was shot on location in and around Athens, Georgia in 1973. The film’s biggest star, Shelley Winters, was flown in on a private plane that nearly crashed upon landing.

Contemporary reviews for the film were almost unanimously negative, owing to the film's dark racial undercurrents and repeated depictions of rape. One Georgia-based film writer concluded: “Upon leaving the theater, I quite honestly felt nauseous.”

== Alternate titles and versions ==
Over the course of its 10-year run at drive-ins and grindhouse theaters, the film was distributed under several different titles, each intended to market the film as belonging to different genres in an attempt to appeal to a variety of demographics: It was retitled Black Vengeance for distribution as a blaxploitation film, The Victim as a vigilante thriller in the vein of Death Wish, and Redneck County and Redneck County Rape for distribution in the American south as a "hicksploitation" film. Unusually, a wholly alternate version of the film was exhibited under the name Heartbreak Motel. This version—featuring voiceover narration by Eddie—is edited to present the movie as something resembling a filmed play: numerous action scenes are edited out in favor of lengthy dialogue pieces not present in any other versions, while the film's climactic gun battle is replaced by a sequence in which Eddie obtains a recording contract and leaves Georgia for Nashville. Although the Heartbreak Motel version is noticeably less violent than any other version, and omits most of the film's rape sequences, it also incorporates an anal sex scene between Eddie and Bertha missing from Poor Pretty Eddie, set to an unknown bluegrass group to a song that seems to be called "You Don't Have To Say You Love Me In The Morning".

== Home media ==
HD Cinema Classics and Film Chest released the movie on Blu-ray and DVD on April 26, 2011. "Poor Pretty Eddie is another public domain feature restored for Blu-ray by HD Cinema Classics/Film Chest. Anyone who doubts any significant restoration beyond overly aggressive DNR was done on this title need only look at the restoration demo included on the disc. The 35mm print utilized for the master is literally littered with virtually nonstop vertical green scratches, most of which have been removed. Color doesn't seem to have been retimed, at least not significantly, and so things have a slightly ruddy cast some of the time. But let's face it. Though filmed in Technicolor (and mid-70s Technicolor was not the Technicolor of yore), this was never a big budget film, and that low budget indie ethos shines (if that's the right word) through virtually every frame of Poor Pretty Eddie. This was never a glossy, pretty film to begin with and it still isn't. The DNR applied means there's an overly smooth texture to this release, but it also means that we have a largely blemish free image. Color is certainly above average, if not mind blowingly robust, given the low budget confines of the original film. Contrast is on the low side, as it obviously has been from day one, and therefore detail tends to get lost in some of the darker interior scenes. The image is also very soft most of the time, but, again, that's how this film looked from day one. But overall, this is the second color film HD Cinema Classics/Film Chest has released in the last week or so (The Terror being the other), and the results, while not perfect, are not as hideously troublesome as those who want grain, and lots of it, seem to think."

== See also ==
- List of American films of 1975
