= Michael Christian (actor) =

American actor

- Born: June 21, 1943 (age 82); Baltimore, Maryland, United States
- Occupation(s): Actor, screenwriter

Michael Christian (born June 21, 1943) is an American actor best known for such films and television series as Peyton Place as Joe Rossi, Poor Pretty Eddie, Hard Knocks and Private Obsession.
