= Shark (2000 film) =

Great White
- DVD Cover
- Directed by: Zac Reeder
- Written by: Zac Reeder
- Produced by: Bryan Todd
- Starring: Richard Keats; RaJa Collins; CJ Morrow; Terry Arrowsmith; Stephanie Allen
- Cinematography: Kenneth Stipe
- Edited by: Jonathan Alexander
- Music by: Gigi Meroni
- Distributed by: 4 Corners Entertainment
- Release date: 27 April 2000 (US)
- Running time: 87 mins
- Country: United States
- Language: English

Great White (alternatively called Shark) is a 2000 horror film written and directed by Zac Reeder. The film is based on the 1916 shark attacks in New Jersey. The film's title was changed to Shark for the first United States home video release, but was kept the same internationally.

== Plot ==
Based on the Jersey Shore attacks of 1916, a string of mysterious deaths begin to plague a small desert town. The events attract the attention of Professor Steven Miller (Richard Keats). At first, Sheriff Ross (Terry Arrowsmith) claims the incidents are the result of mountain animals - but the circumstances don't add up, and Miller is skeptical. With a shark sighting by a town drunk, and a chewed-up body that has washed ashore, Steven must convince the doubtful law enforcement that the waters of Laughlin, Nevada have been invaded by a twelve-foot great white shark.

== Cast ==
- Richard Keats as Steven Miller
- Raja Collins as David Miller
- Terry Arrowsmith as Sheriff Ross
- Stephanie Allen as Nancy Miller
- CJ Morrow as Sarge
- Crocket Maricle as The Sergeant
- Ryan Moe as Sam
- Drew Wood as Joe
- Michael Main as Jake
- Zac Reeder as himself
- Jay Link as himself
- Juni Reeder as Officer

== Release ==
The film was first released on DVD and VHS in the United States on August 22, 2000, through Leo Films, however, with distorted audio tracks and retitled. Shark was also released in Japan by Beam Entertainment, and in Germany through VZM. The film was re-released on February 11, 2014, in the United States under its original title Great White from RetroVision Entertainment, LLC. The DVD featured the correctly mixed English audio track and presents the film without any edits.

== See also ==
- List of killer shark films
