= Joe Rossi (Peyton Place) =

- Peyton Place character
- Portrayed by: Michael Christian
- First appearance: February 22, 1968 (#411)
- Last appearance: October 30, 1968 (#473)
In-universe information
- Family: Michael Rossi (brother); Lisa (sister)
- Spouse: Jill Smith

Joe 'Joey' Rossi is a fictional character on the television drama Peyton Place. He was portrayed by actor Michael Christian, during the fourth and fifth seasons in 1968.

== Character history ==
=== Early life ===
Joe had the reputation of a typical bad boy. He never had a lot of contact with his much older brother Michael Rossi and grew up in New York under the care of his sister Lisa. In his teens, he spent most of his time hanging out with a bad crowd and was often put in juvenile's prison for theft and other minor criminal acts. He often stood in the shadow of Michael, who was idolized, whereas Joe was looked down upon.

=== Connection to Jill ===
Offscreen, in the late 1960s, Joe had a short-lived relationship with Jill Smith, who suddenly left him.

=== Peyton Place ===
In 1968, Joe comes to Peyton Place, because he could not bear living with his sister anymore. However, it is later revealed he fled to town to avoid the revenge of a hoodlum friend in New York City. He immediately seeks contact with Michael, who criticizes him for his lack of responsibility. Meanwhile, he notices Jill's baby and thinks it is his, but Jill denies it.

It later turns out Joe and Jill together made up a story on their baby to scheme the residents of Peyton Place. They marry and leave town.

== Production ==
Michael Christian was cast in the role on September 30, 1967 and first appeared on television almost five months later.
