= Sacrificial Princess and the King of Beasts =

Japanese manga series

- Cover of the first manga volume

贄姫と獣の王 (Niehime to Kemono no Ō)
- Genre: Romantic fantasy
- Manga
- Written by: Yū Tomofuji
- Published by: Hakusensha
- English publisher: NA: Yen Press
- Magazine: Hana to Yume
- Original run: November 5, 2015 – October 20, 2020
- Volumes: 15
- Manga

Sacrificial Princess and the King of Beasts Heir: White Rabbit and the Prince of Beasts
- Written by: Yū Tomofuji
- Published by: Hakusensha
- English publisher: NA: Yen Press
- Magazine: Hana to Yume
- Original run: August 20, 2022 – February 20, 2024
- Volumes: 5
- Anime television series
- Directed by: Chiaki Kon
- Written by: Seishi Minakami
- Music by: Kohta Yamamoto
- Studio: J.C.Staff
- Licensed by: Crunchyroll: SEA: Plus Media Networks Asia
- Original network: Tokyo MX, BS11
- Original run: April 20, 2023 – September 28, 2023
- Episodes: 24
- icon

Sacrificial Princess and the King of Beasts (贄姫と獣の王, Niehime to Kemono no Ō) is a Japanese manga series written and illustrated by Yū Tomofuji. It was serialized in Hakusensha's shōjo manga magazine Hana to Yume from November 2015 to October 2020. It is licensed in North America by Yen Press. An anime television series adaptation produced by J.C.Staff aired from April to September 2023.

== Plot ==
The King of the Beasts and Demons regularly receives female human sacrifices to eat in order to assert the dominance of his people over the human race. However, for the 99th sacrifice, the human girl brought to the capital, Sariphi, intrigues the Beast King. In fact she isn't afraid of him or any other beast and even accepts her death without begging or crying as she has neither home nor family to return to if she were released. The King finds her intriguing and let her stay at his side as his consort despite being human. This is the story of how Sariphi will become the queen of the demons and beasts.

== Characters ==
=== Sacrificial Princess and the King of Beasts ===
Sariphi (サリフィ, Sarifi)
Voiced by: Aoi Yūki (drama CD), Kana Hanazawa (anime) (Japanese); Emi Lo (English)
A girl sacrificed to the King of Beasts, nicknamed "Sari" and future Queen of Beasts. She is a kind and compassionate girl with an upbeat and positive attitude on life. She loves Leonhart very much.
Leonhart (レオンハート, Reonharuto)
Voiced by: Kenjiro Tsuda (drama CD), Satoshi Hino (anime), Yumi Uchiyama (young) (Japanese); Ray Hurd, Kiba Walker (young) (English)
King of the kingdom of Ozmargo. Born as half-breed from beast father and human mother. Despite his stoic and aggressive behavior, he is a gentle and benevolent king who cares about his subjects and loves Sariphi very much.
Clops and Cy (ロプス & キュク, Lops and Kyuku)
Voiced by: Rie Takahashi (Clops; drama CD), Yui Ogura (Cy; drama CD), Natsumi Fujiwara (Clops; anime), Yuka Nukui (Cy; anime) (Japanese); Kristian Eros (Clops), Lisette Monique Diaz (Cy) (English)
A duo and the youngest of the cyclopian clan. Cy is the eye and speaks few words. Clops is the mouth and does most of the speaking. Clops can see through Cy's eye and they can communicate with each other over great distances. Both were born deformed to the cyclopian clan, but were abandoned for their unnatural state; only to be taken in by King Leonhart who accepted them for their abilities, becoming two of his personal advisers.
Anubis (アヌビス, Anubisu)
Voiced by: Takahiro Sakurai (drama CD), Takuma Terashima (anime), Rie Kugimiya (young) (Japanese); Tom Laflin, Jad Saxton (young) (English)
He is Leonhart's most trusted advisor. His personal name is Sirius (シリウス, Shiriusu). His design is likely based on the Pharaoh Hound.
Amit (アミト, Amito)
Voiced by: Megumi Han (anime) (Japanese); Brittany Lauda (English)
Princess of the Reptile Clan who fell in love with Jormungand. She's very shy and develops a good friendship with Sariphi.
Ilya (イリヤ, Irīa)
Voiced by: Shōya Chiba, Riho Sugiyama (young) (Japanese); Clifford Chapin, Dusty Feeney (young) (English)
Childhood friend of Sariphi and he is in love with her. After losing his village and family to a beast attack, he developed a deep hatred of all beasts
Jormungand (ヨルムンガンド, Yorumungando)
Voiced by: Junichi Yanagita (drama CD), Chikahiro Kobayashi (anime) (Japanese); Brian Mathis (English)
Captain of the royal guard. As a child, he dreamed of becoming a knight, but was constantly rejected in his homeland due to his low-born status and likewise rejected in Ozmargo due to Anti-Reptilian prejudice. When Leonheart took the throne, he made Jormungand the captain, and he swore loyalty to the king; becoming one of his advisers as well, especially in terms of military matters. Although he is equally shy to admit it, he returns Princess Amit's feelings. Near the end, he openly admits he desires children with her, to which they both blushed.
Bennu (ベンヌ, Ben'nu)
Voiced by: Hiroyuki Yoshino (anime) (Japanese); Christopher Guerrero (English)
A Phoenix. Sariphi's own Holy Beast.
Lanteveldt (ラントベルト, Rantoberuto)
Voiced by: Tasuku Hatanaka (anime), Yuka Takakura (young) (Japanese); Orion Pitts, Laura Faverty (young) (English)
The Queen's hyena personal guard. He's also called Lante. Proud of his own hyenian blood. Despite his laid-back personality, he cares for Sariphi.
Gwiber (グウィバー, Guwibā)
Voiced by: Kōji Okino (Japanese); Aaron Michael (English)
A dragon. Leonhart's Holy Beast.
Joz (ジョズ, Jozu)
Voiced by: Kenta Miyake
Second-in-command and Galois' son. He pretended to be his father and was abusive as part of a ruse to test Sariphi. He later regretted his actions and was willing to be punished in Galois' place.
Galois (ガロア, Garoa)
Voiced by: Hōchū Ōtsuka
Leader of the Istanese Navy. His deeds earned him the title "The Sea God'. When he learned about Sariphi, he tested her character to see if she was worthy for the king. He and his men then swore loyalty to Leonheart as atonement for deceiving him.
Tetra (テトラ, Tetora)
Voiced by: Rina Hidaka (Japanese); Nia Celeste (English)
She is the princess of Sarbul. She is the daughter of King Teto and Queen Calra. She had three eldest sisters and younger brother named Calcara.
Teto (テト7世)
Voiced by: Takashi Matsuyama
He is the seventh king of Sarbul and the father of Tetra and Calcara.
Calra (カルラ, Kara)
Voiced by: Aya Hisakawa (Japanese); KyLeigh Zimmerer (English)
She is the queen of Sarbul and the mother of Tetra and Calcara.
Calcara (カルカラ, Karukara)
Voiced by: Kaede Hondo (Japanese); Lara Woodhull (English)
The firstborn prince of Sarbul and the son of Teto, Calra and the younger brother of Tetra.
Set (セト, Setto)
Voiced by: Kōki Miyata (drama CD), Kohsuke Toriumi (anime), Risae Matsuda (young) (Japanese); Sean Letourneau, Tristan Bonner (young) (English)
A judge. He was born to one of the king's concubines and an unknown man, but was lied to about his lineage being royal. He eventually discovered the secret of Leonheart's mixed blood and exposed him in front of the kingdom. He planned to segregate all beasts by species. When facing against Leonheart, he attempted to use a powerful spell, but broken down when he reached his limit.
Fenrir (フェンリル, Fenriru)
Voiced by: Yuichi Nakamura, Mutsumi Tamura (young) (anime) (Japanese); David Matranga, Jesse Pinnick (young) (English)
The twelfth prince of Phantom Wolf Kingdom. As a child he fought Leonhart in a count duel and lost. As a result he lost his status as prince and his home by having his ear chopped off by his family. Since then he has borne a grudge against Leonhart, vowing to one day destroy him and take the throne as the new king of all beasts. He planned to use Sariphi as a sacrifice, but after seeing Sariphi was unafraid of him and how much Leonhart loved her, he decides to win her heart and make Sariphi his queen. Fenrir and Leonhart eventually have a final duel, in which Fenrir is defeated. When Leonhart is about to finish him off, Fenrir is suddenly stabbed and killed by Nir, as Fenrir had ordered Nir to kill him if he lost the duel. Nir leaves with Fenrir's body while telling Leonhart that defeating him and becoming the king of beasts was Fenrir's dream but also his curse.
Gleipnir (グレイプニル, Gureipuniru)
Voiced by: Masaaki Mizunaka, Ayaka Asai (young) (anime) (Japanese); Xan Cramer, Danielle Yoshiko Phillips (young) (English)
He is nicknamed Nir (ニル, Niru). He once lived as a slave, but was taken in by Fenrir, and now serves as his right-hand man.
Ocelot (オセロット)
Voiced by: Nobuhiko Okamoto, Haruka Shiraishi (young) (Japanese); Ethan Gallardo (English)
A Captain of the Maskviana Exorcistic Order and childhood friend of Anastasia.
Anastasia (アナスタシア, Anasutashia)
Voiced by: Saori Hayami (Japanese); Mallorie Rodak (English)
A relative of Leonhart. Her clan has been ostracized by the villagers of Shidal. When her parents couldn't take the persecution anymore, they fled the village and left her behind.

=== White Rabbit and the Prince of Beasts ===
Richard (リチャード, Richādo)
Voiced by: Sayumi Suzushiro
Son of Sariphi and Leonhart. A very rambunctious and energetic boy, he switches from human to beast form randomly. He enjoys training with Lante and wants to be as strong as his father. He inherited white hair from his mother and red eyes from his father.
Subaru (スバル)
Ravi (ラヴィ, Rabi)
Kemomo (ケモモ)
Bishia (ビーシア, Bīshia)
Edward (エドワズ, Edowādo)

== Media ==
=== Manga ===
The manga started serialization in Hakusensha's shōjo manga magazine Hana to Yume on November 5, 2015, and it ended on October 20, 2020. The manga was part of the initial lineup in Hakusensha's online shop selling series-themed goods. Yen Press announced that they had licensed the manga at Anime Expo 2017, releasing the first volume in May 2018.

The manga is also licensed in South Korea by Haksan Publishing, in French by Pika Édition, in Germany by Carlsen Verlag., in Thailand by Siam Inter Comics, in Italy by Magic Press, and in Spain by ECC Ediciones. A special edition of the sixth volume of the manga contained a CD of an audio drama adaptation of the series.

A spin-off manga, titled White Rabbit and the Prince of Beasts, was serialized in Hana to Yume from August 20, 2022, to February 20, 2024. Yen Press announced that they had also licensed the spin-off manga at Anime NYC 2024 under the title Sacrificial Princess and the King of Beasts Heir: White Rabbit and the Prince of Beasts.

==== Volume list ====
===== Sacrificial Princess and the King of Beasts =====
No.	Original release date	Original ISBN	North America release date	North America ISBN
1	May 20, 2016	978-4-592-21541-7	May 22, 2018	978-0-316-48098-7
Chapters 1-5; The Beast Princess and the Regular King
2	September 20, 2016	978-4-592-21542-4	July 24, 2018	978-0-316-48099-4
Chapters 6-11; The Beast Princess and the Regular King
3	January 20, 2017	978-4-592-21543-1	October 30, 2018	978-0-316-48105-2
Chapters 12-17; The Beast Princess and the Regular King
4	May 19, 2017	978-4-592-21544-8	January 22, 2019	978-0-316-48108-3
Chapters 18-23; The Beast Princess and the Regular King
5	September 20, 2017	978-4-592-21545-5	April 30, 2019	978-1-9753-0369-3
Chapters 24-29; The Beast Princess and the Regular King (And His Attendant)
6	January 19, 2018	978-4-592-21546-2 (regular edition); 978-4-592-10587-9 (special edition)	July 30, 2019	978-1-9753-0437-9
Chapters 30-35; The Beast Princess and the Regular Princess
7	April 20, 2018	978-4-592-21547-9	October 1, 2019	978-1-9753-0440-9
Chapters 36-41; The Beast Princess and the Regular Servant
8	July 20, 2018	978-4-592-21548-6	December 31, 2019	978-1-9753-0443-0
Chapters 42-47; The Beast Lad and the Regular Boy
9	November 20, 2018	978-4-592-21549-3	March 31, 2020	978-1-9753-9953-5
Chapters 48-53; The Beast Princess and the Regular Princess and the Captain
10	March 20, 2019	978-4-592-21550-9	July 28, 2020	978-1-9753-1285-5
Chapters 54-59; The Fallen Country's Exiled Prince and His Attendant
11	August 20, 2019	978-4-592-22301-6	November 3, 2020	978-1-9753-1453-8
Chapters 60-65; The Beast Princess and the Regular King
12	December 20, 2019	978-4-592-22722-9 (regular edition); 978-4-592-22722-9 (special edition)	January 5, 2021	978-1-9753-1456-9
Chapters 66-71; The Inverted Sacrificial Princess
13	April 20, 2020	978-4-592-22303-0	June 29, 2021	978-1-9753-2489-6
Chapters 72-77; The Inverted Sacrificial Princess Continued
14	August 20, 2020	978-4-592-22304-7	December 28, 2021	978-1-9753-2491-9
Chapters 78-83; The Inverted Sacrificial Princess Final Episode
15	January 20, 2021	978-4-592-22305-4 (regular edition); 978-4-592-22757-1 (special edition)	April 26, 2022	978-1-9753-3553-3
Chapters 84-89; The Beast Princess and the Regular King; Side Stories 1-3; Sequel Story: Those Two Later On

===== White Rabbit and the Prince of Beasts =====
No.	Original release date	Original ISBN	English release date	English ISBN
1	January 20, 2023	978-4-592-22451-8	March 18, 2025	979-8-8554-0479-1
Chapters 1-4; Chapter 0; Chapter 88.5; Prince Richard's Growth Diary; Afterword/Postscript
2	April 20, 2023	978-4-592-22452-5	August 26, 2025	979-8-8554-0481-4
Chapters 5-9; Prince Richard's Growth Diary
3	August 18, 2023	978-4-592-22453-2	March 24, 2026	979-8-8554-0483-8
Chapter 10; Chapter 11; Chapter 12; Chapter 13; Chapter 14; Prince Richard's Growth Diary; SP Short
4	December 20, 2023	978-4-592-22454-9	March 23, 2027	979-8-8554-0485-2
Chapter 15; Chapter 16; Chapter 17; Chapter 18; Chapter 19; The Beast Princess and the Regular King; Chapter 0
5	April 19, 2024	978-4-592-22455-6	—	—
Chapter 20; Chapter 21; Chapter 22; Chapter 23; Chapter 24; Chapter 25

=== Anime ===
An anime television series adaptation was announced in the fourth issue of Hana to Yume on January 20, 2021. The series is produced by J.C.Staff and directed by Chiaki Kon, with scripts written by Seishi Minakami, character designs handled by Shinya Hasegawa, and music composed by Kohta Yamamoto. It aired from April 20 to September 28, 2023, on Tokyo MX and BS11. For the first cour, the opening theme song is "Saku no Nie" (朔の贄; "Sacrifice During the New Moon") by BIN, while the ending theme song is "Only" by Garnidelia. For the second cour, the opening theme song is "Love Infinity" by Hinano, while the ending theme song is "Call Your Name" by Katagiri. Crunchyroll has licensed the series.

==== Episode list ====
No.	Title	Directed by	Written by	Storyboarded by	Original release date
1	"The Sacrifice and the Night of the Ritual"; Transliteration: "Ikenie to Kugi no Yoru" (Japanese: 生贄と供犠の夜)	Ken'ichi Nishida	Seishi Minakami	Masako Satō	April 20, 2023
Sariphi is taken in chains to the Kingdom of Beasts, Ozmargo, as a sacrifice. The King is intrigued when she is rude to his chancellor Anubis but shows no fear. Her name means "sacrifice" and her adoptive parents raised her as a surrogate sacrifice replacing their own daughter and she has accepted her fate. The King temporarily treats her as a guest and takes her on an inspection of a border town where flowers grow - one of the few places in the kingdom not covered with poisonous miasma. On the night of the sacrifice in a secluded underground room, Sariphi is confronted by an assassin planning to kill the King but a human suddenly stops him. The man is in fact the King whose mother was human which causes him to suffer immense guilt over his deception. The transformation occurs on each rare "moonlit night of the revelation" when he is supposed to devour the sacrifice. He secretly releases the sacrifices then cuts himself to make it look like their blood has spilled. He symbolically breaks Sariphi's chains and the next day as the beast King, he outrages his court by declaring Sariphi will be his Queen. Sariphi calls the unnamed king "Leonhart", meaning "brave heart", which he accepts.
2	"Carpenter Bees and a Court Banquet"; Transliteration: "Kumabachi to Kizoku no Utage" (Japanese: 熊蜂と貴族の宴)	Makoto Sokuza	Seishi Minakami	Haifeng Liang	April 27, 2023
The King's court begs him to reconsider his choice for queen but he refuses. He orders Sariphi not to call him Leonhart in public. Sariphi makes some paper flowers to decorate the castle and likens Leonhart to a carpenter bee because of his large furry body and gentle nature. At a banquet to present Sariphi to the rest of the kingdom, the guests of various beast races are shocked to learn a human will be the queen. Sariphi disarms the guests by helping the servants distribute food, also impressing Leonhart. A Reptilian trips Sariphi causing her to spill wine on the King. However, Leonhart saw his ploy and prepares to kill the transgressor but Sariphi stops him to prevent any bloodshed. After the banquet, Sariphi regrets not being more useful, but the King takes her out to a beautiful, remote area on his dragon-like Holy Beast Gwiber. He explains that her purpose is to help keep his violent nature in check as she did with the Reptilian. He then allows her to privately call him Leonhart.
3	"Beasts and a Human Town"; Transliteration: "Mazoku to Ningen no Machi" (Japanese: 魔族と人間の町)	Shigeki Awai	Seishi Minakami	Iku Suzuki	May 4, 2023
Sariphi takes lessons on Ozmargo, but Anubis gives up when she proves inept at studying. When Anubis mentions Leonhart has not taken a break in ages, she asks him to go on a walk with her through town. Leonhart disguises himself with a hood and makes Sariphi disguise herself as a beast. They have fun mingling with the citizens and help a lost child find his mother, but Sariphi begins to feel faint and her disguise falls off. The citizens immediately turn hostile at seeing a human, forcing Leonhart to escape with her. Back in the palace, Sariphi faints and the physician says she has been poisoned by miasma exposure. Sariphi wakes up in a human town in the care of a physician and his wife, who explain that they treated her after she was left at their doorstep with money and a note that none of them can read as it is in beast language. She becomes their assistant, but when the townsfolk learn she was the sacrifice, they trash the clinic and assault the physician, forcing them to kick her out. Heartbroken, she wanders the woods, but Leonhart in his human form finds her and explains the note said he would come back for her after he acquired a ring that will protect her from the miasma. They return home and Sariphi likens the ring to a wedding ring.
4	"The Feline and Reptile Princesses"; Transliteration: "Meneko to Hachū no Hime" (Japanese: 女猫と爬虫の姫)	Ken'ichi Nishida	Seishi Minakami	Ken'ichi Nishida	May 11, 2023
Sariphi learns Leonhart's mother's identity was concealed as a beast. She meets Vivian, the princess of the Cats, whom with other beast princesses seek to marry Leonhart or at least become his concubine. Sariphi walks in on Vivian trying to seduce Leonhart and walks out in jealousy, missing Leonhart kicking her out. She befriends Amit, the princess of the Reptilians, who has been exiled until she can get with Leonhart. Jormungand, the Reptilian captain of the guard, returns from a mission and Amit reveals to Sariphi that she has been in love with him ever since a time he helped her as a child. At a banquet to honor Jormungand's return, the other princesses tear Amit's dress apart, but Sariphi loans her a dress that makes her turn heads, and Amit is delighted when Jormungand recognizes her. Vivian gets Sariphi alone and threatens her as she plans to seduce Leonhart and make him her puppet. Amit finds and defends Sariphi, then Leonhart arrives and angrily orders Vivian to get out. The princesses go home except for Amit, whom Leonhart makes Sariphi's assistant. Leonhart tells Sariphi that he needs no concubines because he only wants her, which makes her heart skip a beat.
5	"The Holy Beast of Immortality and Rebirth"; Transliteration: "Fushi to Saisei no Seijū" (Japanese: 不死と再生の聖獣)	Kiyotaka Kanchiku	Seishi Minakami	Masako Satō	May 18, 2023
Anubis says Sariphi must prove herself as Queen by summoning a Holy Beast, but Leonhart points out since she has no magic, she would have to power the spell with her own life force and there is a risk she could summon a malevolent demon. Wanting to contribute, she agrees to do it, but repeatedly botches the spell and hurts herself. While resting, Sariphi says she is willing to sacrifice herself, but Leonhart reminds her that she must live for him. Galvanized, she performs the spell and summons a baby phoenix, Bennu. Sariphi is the only one who can understand his speech. Bennu is arrogant and rude, and is insulted when Anubis doubts he is really a phoenix. Bennu confides that he was reduced to his current state after exhausting his power healing ungrateful soldiers. A pair of assassins fire an arrow at Bennu, which grazes him and knocks him off a wall. Sariphi instinctively jumps out a window to try to catch him. To save her, Bennu transforms into his full phoenix form, catches her, and flies into the sky, amazing everyone.
6	"A Boy and the King of Beasts"; Transliteration: "Shōnen to Mazoku no Ō" (Japanese: 少年と魔族の王)	Takaaki Ishiyama	Akiko Waba	Takaaki Ishiyama	May 25, 2023
The assassins who shot at Bennu are interrogated, but they claim that they only fired instinctively at a human and kill themselves. A human man attacks the guards while demanding Leonhart before being overpowered and locked in the dungeons. He swears revenge on the beasts for killing Sariphi, only to be relieved when he sees her alive. She explains that he is her childhood friend Ilya who hates beasts for attacking his village and swore to protect her. She convinces Leonhart to release him and send him home, but shortly after he is released, he faints from hunger. They put him in a guest room, but when Sariphi and Amit bring food, he insults Amit for being a beast and asks Sariphi to come with him, angered when she refuses because she will marry Leonhart. After comforting Amit, Sariphi brings Ilya more food. He tries to convince her that a beast like Leonhart could not possibly love her, but when she still refuses to leave, he knocks her out and carries her off. Anubis, who wanted Sariphi gone, claims that she went with him willingly, but Amit reminds Leonhart of how hard she worked to prove herself worthy. Leonhart leaves Jormungand in charge while he uses Gwiber to pursue them.
7	"A Boy of Love and Hate"; Transliteration: "Ai to Nikushimi no Shōnen" (Japanese: 愛と憎しみの少年)	Yasuo Iwamoto	Seishi Minakami	Kōichi Takada	June 1, 2023
Bennu joins Gwiber and Leonhart and uses his connection to Sariphi to track her (Gwiber translates Bennu's speech for Leonhart). While Ilya carries an unwilling Sariphi on horseback, they get attacked by a pack of hyena-men. Ilya kills them, but when he attempts to kill a child among them, Sariphi helps the child escape and asks why he would go this far. He says all beasts are evil and confesses that he is in love with her. She sadly refuses him and says that there are good and evil beasts, just like humans. He retorts that before they met, beasts killed and ate his mother and little sister Misha, and for that, he will never rest until the beasts are exterminated. He ties her up just as Leonhart arrives and fights him. Leonhart holds back and gets stabbed in the gut. Ilya loses his will to fight when Sariphi cries over Leonhart, making him realize she genuinely loves him. Bennu heals Leonhart and Ilya makes him promise to protect Sariphi. Bennu flies Sariphi and Ilya to a human territory so they can properly say goodbye. Back in the palace, everybody except Anubis is happy Sariphi is back and they have a garden party. Sariphi ponders that she cannot stop the hatred between humans and beasts, but right now, they are happy together.
8	"The Sea God and the Second Ordeal"; Transliteration: "Watatsumi to Daini no Shiren" (Japanese: 海神と第二の試練)	Shigeki Awai	Atsuo Ishino	Iku Suzuki	June 8, 2023
A feast is held in honor of the war hero Duke Galois of the fish-like Ichthyan race. Galois, who is abusive to his disfigured servant, arrives and insults Sariphi for being human. She attempts to give him a tour of the palace, but forgets a fact and angers him. He gets even angrier when she cannot stomach his gift of wine. She excuses herself from the feast, but Leonhart follows her, shares food, and kisses her. She later asks Galois for a dance, but he makes his servant take his place. The servant says he was burned by humans as revenge for killing several of them, but he does not hate humans. When he sees Sariphi and his servant are having fun, Galois angrily threatens him with his sword, but she shields him. When he attempts to strike her, the servant catches the sword, then reveals that he is the true Galois and the fake was his second-in-command and son, Joz. Galois explains the ruse was to test the character of the human who would be their queen, and she passed. Sariphi urges Leonhart not to punish them for tricking everyone, so he orders them to continue to protect his kingdom from sea invaders. Once everyone has gone home, Leonhart asks Sariphi for a dance.
9	"Recollections of a King and His Chancellor"; Transliteration: "Ō to Saishō no Tsuioku" (Japanese: 王と宰相の追憶)	Ken'ichi Nishida	Yoriko Tomita	Iku Suzuki	June 15, 2023
Because Sariphi confided to Galois that she felt unworthy to be Queen, Anubis votes to have her removed, but Leonhart overrules him. It is revealed Anubis hates Sariphi because he thinks she seduced Leonhart just to save herself. Sariphi looks for new books to read. Anubis leads her to a library, then tries to kill her when they are alone. He is foiled when books fall on him and knock him out. He has a flashback of his past. As a child, he was named Sirius. His father, the previous Anubis, sacrificed himself to save the previous king from assassins. The then King assigned him to be the Prince's assistant. Sirius found the Prince strange for refusing to step on ants and disliking sword training. When he became ill, the Prince took care of him, but they were suddenly kidnapped by the assassins' group. Deeming Sirius useless, they attempted to kill him, but the Prince shielded him with his body, saying a true ruler protects his people, then knocked out the assassins with magic. When they recovered, Sirius changed his name to Anubis and dedicated his life to Leonhart. Anubis wakes up to find Sariphi taking care of him. He angrily says he will never accept her, but she does not mind and says Leonhart was worried about him too. Later, Anubis decides to test Sariphi in earnest to see if she is truly worthy of Leonhart.
10	"Day of Festival and Revelation"; Transliteration: "Shukusai to Tenkei no Hi" (Japanese: 祝祭と天啓の日)	Kōzō Kaihō	Seishi Minakami	Kōichi Takada	June 22, 2023
The Grand Consecration, the anniversary of Ozmargo's founding, where Leonhart will wear the first king's clothes, is coming up. On the night before, Leonhart returns to his human form, so Sariphi hides him while he laments that he would be killed if his subjects ever learned of this. The next morning, they are shocked to find he is still in human form. The palace looks for them, forcing them to run and hide. He slowly returns to beast form, but he notes that he does not have enough time to get dressed and make it to the first ceremony. Sariphi stalls the judge Set when he reaches their hiding place long enough for Leonhart to revert back. He decides to go to the first ceremony in his ordinary clothes and dazzles the crowd with a speech about changing with the times and moving forward. With the Grand Consecration done, Anubis gives Sariphi a choice. She can be Acting Queen Consort, but if she fails in her duties, she will be exiled, or she can decline and live as Leonhart's pet while he chooses a new wife. After Bennu's encouragement, she chooses to be Acting Queen Consort.
11	"Divine Protection and the Acting Queen Consort"; Transliteration: "Kago to Ōhi no Dairi" (Japanese: 加護と王妃の代理)	Shigeki Awai	Akiko Waba	Iku Suzuki	June 29, 2023
Jormungand is on a mission to fight bandits and tells a soldier to stay home and tend to his pregnant wife. Amit makes good luck charms for him and Sariphi, but becomes depressed when she overhears him say he is uninterested in marriage. After Sariphi gets her charm, she encourages Amit not to give up on him, so she gives him the charm before he leaves, making him promise to survive. The court goes to the allied nation Sarbul so Sariphi can bless King Tet IV and Queen Calra's newborn son, Calcara. However, Calra does not want a human touching her son. They have a feast, but Leonhart and Sariphi retire early and he comforts her when she says Calra looked at her the same empty way her adoptive parents did. When they begin the ceremony, where Sariphi is supposed to hold Calcara and kiss his forehead, Calra pinches Calcara to make him cry and postpone the ceremony. Anubis noticed what she did, but considers this a test for Sariphi. As they decide to try the ceremony tomorrow, the young Princess Tetra offers to give Sariphi a tour of the palace.
12	"Blessings and a Vow for the Future"; Transliteration: "Shukufuku to Mirai no Chigiri" (Japanese: 祝福と未来の契)	Teppei Takeya	Seishi Minakami	Risako Yoshida	July 6, 2023
Queen Calra becomes uneasy in the presence of her daughter, but reluctantly allows Tetra to be Sariphi's guide before taking her leave. Once alone, Tetra calls Sariphi ugly and makes her do tasks like playing fetch, stealing desserts, and letting Tetra ride her like a horse; but she is surprised and put off that Sariphi thinks this is fun instead of demeaning. Tetra rants that her mother ignored her ever since Calcara was born; since no one loves her, she will commit suicide by leaping from a tower. Sariphi tries to talk her down, and she is surprised when Queen Calra shows up to talk her down; convincing her that her mother loves her. She loses her balance and falls off, as does Sariphi who tried to catch her, but Gwiber saves them. To everyone's awe, Sariphi grant's the royal blessing to Tetra. Grateful for helping her daughter and making her realize her own flaws, Calra allows Sariphi to perform the ceremony. Tetra and Sariphi have a sleepover where Tetra says she is attracted to Anubis, but if they married, their children would look like him due to his superior genetics. Sariphi is embarrassed when she brings up her having children with Leonhart. Leonhart pulls her aside and confides that he never knew his mother and his father, the previous king, was harsh and strict with him and locked him up whenever he took human form. When his father was dying of an illness, he said he always hated him for his human blood and tried to strangle him before succumbing. Because of this, Leonhart feared passing his condition to any children, but he promises to consummate their union once it is safe. The next day, as Sariphi says goodbye to Tetra and her family, they are delighted when Calcara says his first words, "Big sister."
13	"A Sympathy Call and a Hyena Guard Captain"; Transliteration: "Imon to Haiena no Taichō" (Japanese: 慰問と鬣犬の隊長)	Shinpei Nagai; Ken'ichi Nishida	Atsuo Ishino	Kōichi Takada	July 13, 2023
Sariphi is assigned to visit the town Maasya to inspect the troops and see the appointing of the new lord, but Leonhart cannot come because he must attend to a dying friend. Guards are assigned to her, but the Hyena Lanteveldt is the only one who volunteers. She nicknames him Lante and he annoys everyone but her due to his lack of manners. On the journey, Lante makes them take a detour that gets them attacked by giant sand serpents, but he defeats them. He admits to Sariphi that he lured them on purpose to make himself look good. They arrive and Sariphi tells the troops that Leonhart believes in them and to do their best. The new lord, Braun, will be made official tomorrow. Some troops harass Lante for being a Hyena, citing that his people were once traitors, but Sariphi scolds them. Lante dismisses her as naive when he lies about himself and she believes him until he reveals the truth. The next morning, they find that Braun was attacked.
14	"A False Charge and a Lonely Hyena"; Transliteration: "Nureginu to Kodoku no Haiena" (Japanese: 濡衣と孤独の鬣犬)	Takaaki Ishiyama	Yoriko Tomita	Takaaki Ishiyama	July 20, 2023
Braun will recover, but based on his description of his attacker and a tuft of fur he ripped off, Lante is arrested. Sariphi vows to exonerate him and the commander, Teiryns, helps her. In his cell, Lante remembers how as a child, he raised money to buy medicine for his sick mother, but because he was a Hyena, guards accused him of stealing the medicine, confiscated it, and beat him up, leading to his mother's death. Sariphi and Teiryns capture the real attacker, a Badger who hated authority. Because the beasts are mostly colorblind, Sariphi was the only one able to tell the fur did not match Lante but matched the Badger. Upon release, Lante swears eternal loyalty to Sariphi for believing in him. Braun officially becomes the Lord of Maasya. When they arrive home, Sariphi faints from exhaustion and is sent to her room. While Lante's lack of manners angers Anubis, his loyalty to Sariphi impresses Leonhart and he makes him a knight.
15	"Chance Meeting of a Boy and a Child"; Transliteration: "Shōnen to Osanago no Kaigō" (Japanese: 少年と幼子の邂逅)	Shigeki Awai	Seishi Minakami	Kōichi Takada	July 27, 2023
Amit is worried because Jormungand is not back yet from his mission; meanwhile, he defends citizens from rebels. When he finally comes back, he returns Amit's good luck charm and tells her to give it to someone more deserving, breaking her heart. Sariphi asks him why he returned it, and when he refuses to answer, Lante challenges him to a duel. Jormungand wins, but Leonhart notices that his arm was injured in his mission. Amit treats it and he explains that he felt getting careless made him unworthy of her charm. She persuades him to take it back. In the human lands, Ilya finds two beasts kidnapping a child. He drives them off, but is shocked to find the boy is a beast named Maalo. Maalo explains that the kidnappers were hired by humans to capture beasts to be stuffed or put in freak shows. Maalo becomes attached to Ilya, to his annoyance, but Ilya is surprised to find that he acts almost exactly like a human and is amazed to see flowers for the first time. Two human knights show up demanding Maalo. Ilya says he does not care about him and lets them take him, but when Maalo begs for help, he is reminded of his sister and fights the knights off. Remembering how Sariphi said beasts are just like humans, Ilya takes Maalo to the Ozmargo border and tells him to go home. In Maasya, some rebels plot against the king, but someone comes and says they have just been conscripted.
16	"Invasion and the Wolf Without a Kingdom"; Transliteration: "Shinryaku to Bōkoku no Maboroshi Ōkami" (Japanese: 侵略と亡国の幻狼)	Ken'ichi Nishida	Atsuo Ishino	Ken'ichi Nishida	August 3, 2023
Sariphi, Leonhart, and the others travel by ship to inspect the kingdom Bolstobas, but Lante is seasick. When a messenger beast brings urgent news, Leonhart travels back to Ozmargo via Gwiber after putting a protective charm on Sariphi's ring. Fenrir, the King of Wolves, and his subordinate Nir attack the ship and massacre the guards. Fenrir has a grudge against Leonhart and swears to conquer Ozmargo and become the new king. Sariphi offers herself as a hostage to save everyone, and Nir, who spied on the events in Maasya, confirms to a disbelieving Fenrir that she is the queen. Lante tries to fight them, but between his seasickness and Nir's ability to control his swords with telekinesis, he is gravely injured. Sariphi is taken away while Bennu heals Lante and the others. Fenrir's forces are invading Ozmargo and the people are rioting in fear. When they receive word of Sariphi's capture, Anubis convinces Leonhart to stay and calm the people, and Sariphi told them not to save her. Leonhart assures the people that he will protect them, then promises to defeat Fenrir and save Sariphi.
17	"Pursuit and the Vassals' Battle"; Transliteration: "Tsuiseki to Shinka no Kōbō" (Japanese: 追跡と臣下の攻防)	Teppei Takeya	Yoriko Tomita	Iku Suzuki	August 10, 2023
Lante, Bennu, and Cy search for Sariphi in the desert. Fenrir reveals to Sariphi that he was once a prince, but after losing a fight to Leonhart as children, his family chopped off his ear and disowned him. Now he wants to be king and make a world where the strong rule the weak. He is intrigued when Sariphi is not afraid and her ring protects her from his spells and decides to win her heart even though she says she only loves Leonhart. Anubis leads Ozmargo's army to defeat several rebels. Nir offers to let Anubis join their side, and stabs him when he refuses. Fenrir reveals Nir is loyal to him ever since he saved him from slavery. Jormungand rescues Anubis and wounds Nir, who escapes with them in pursuit. Sariphi comforts Fenrir when he has a nightmare. Lante arrives and fights Fenrir while Bennu unties her and flies her away. Sariphi makes him double back to rescue Lante, who was losing badly. Just as they make it outside the fortress, Lante and Bennu collapse from exhaustion. Cy telepathically tells Clops where the fortress is, who relays this to Leonhart.
18	"Rescue and a Fated Duel"; Transliteration: "Kyūshutsu to Shukumei no Taiketsu" (Japanese: 救出と宿命の対決)	Makoto Sokuza	Akiko Waba	Iku Suzuki	August 17, 2023
Fenrir catches up to Sariphi and the others, but Leonhart and Gwiber arrive. Fenrir challenges him to a duel for the title of King. Nir stops Jormungand and Anubis from interferring, but the two promise to only watch, so he stops fighting them. Leonhart and Fenrir battle with magic, but Leonhart quickly exhausts his magic reserves. Realizing that he has not recovered from enchanting Sariphi's ring, Fenrir says they will fight hand-to-hand, tooth and claw. They inflict serious damage to each other and Leonhart falls, but he gets up when he hears Sariphi's voice. He mortally wounds Fenrir, but he refuses to quit. Nir suddenly stabs Fenrir in the back and escapes with his corpse. Leonhart collapses from his injuries, so they rush back to the palace and take him to the healers. Sariphi privately tends to him, now in his human form. Nir carries Fenrir's corpse and remembers how Fenrir left standing orders to kill him if he lost the duel, then asks what to do since Fenrir was his only reason for living. Meanwhile, Set explores the forbidden archives.
19	"A Bridge Between Beasts and Humans"; Transliteration: "Mazoku to Ningen no Kakehashi" (Japanese: 魔族と人間の懸橋)	Shigeki Awai	Atsuo Ishino	Kōichi Takada	August 24, 2023
Ozmargo holds a parade for its victory over Fenrir, but Anubis advises Leonhart not to let Sariphi attend because some citizens still hate humans and he reluctantly agrees. Because Sariphi's ring broke in the battle, Leonhart takes her to a sacred tree and spring that is free of miasma to forge a new one. He later comforts her during a thunderstorm and talks about how he never met his mother and does not know if she is alive or wanted him. He then brings up that it is almost time for the human kingdom Yoana to send another sacrifice and intends to abolish that practice. He also intends to make peace with Yoana so that humans and beasts will one day treat each other as equals. Sariphi volunteers to be an envoy and he reluctantly accepts. Leonhart's court is outraged by his new policies, but eventually agrees. Sariphi refuses to let Lante come with her, certain he would pick fights, so she will go with only Bennu. With a letter to give to the human rulers, they fly off. Meanwhile, Set learns from the archives that all records of Leonhart's birth have been erased, then declares that once he learns his secrets, his ambitions will be realized.
20	"A Royal Letter and a Taboo Witch"; Transliteration: "Shinsho to Kinki no Majo" (Japanese: 親書と禁忌の魔女)	Yūki Morita	Akiko Waba	Shinpei Nagai	August 31, 2023
Shortly after Sariphi and Bennu arrive in Yoana, Ocelot, the Commander of the Knights, saves her from a con artist. When she explains her mission, she is arrested. Later, Ocelot confirms her identity and releases her, but explains the letter is in beast language and cannot be read. A hermit called the Witch of Shidai knows the language, so Sariphi and Bennu go to her house. She is shocked to find the Witch resembles Leonhart's human form. The Witch is hostile and repeatedly orders her to leave. Two belligerent men try to destroy the Witch's edelweiss garden, but they fight them off. When Sariphi says the edelweiss flower represents remembrance, the Witch remembers a boy trying to woo her as children before she rejected him. She reveals her name is Anastasia before Sariphi collapses with a fever. While caring for her, Anastasia reveals a diary written in beast language and explains her ancestor once had a child with a beast, leading to her family being ostracized. Suspecting the ancestor is related to Leonhart, Sariphi asks for the diary, then asks her to come to the palace and read the letter. Meanwhile, Anubis discovers Set sneaking into the forbidden archives. Set claims to be of royal blood and to have learned Leonhart's dark secret.
21	"Peace and a Secret Revealed"; Transliteration: "Wahei to Himitsu no Bakuro" (Japanese: 和平と秘密の暴露)	Takaaki Ishiyama	Yoriko Tomita	Takaaki Ishiyama	September 7, 2023
Without telling Anubis what the secret is, Set asks him to help prove it by going to see Leonhart, saying to barge in if he tries to hide, but Leonhart receives him. When Sariphi and Anastasia go to the palace, they learn Ocelot was the childhood friend who tried to court her. Anastasia translates the letter and the king grants Sariphi an audience. The king says he will decide how to respond in a global council in 7 days, then is amazed when Sariphi says the beasts act just like humans. Sariphi goes home on Bennu and attends a council where Anubis promises to accept her as the true queen if the negotiations with Yoana go well. Noticing Leonhart seems depressed, she asks him on a date, so he takes her to a cave with colorful, glowing crystals. She compares them to stars and he confides that he has never seen the stars because whenever the miasma clears enough for them to be visible, he takes human form and must hide. They promise to watch the stars together some day. The next day, Leonhart goes to make a formal announcement to the people about the peace treaty with Yoana and Sariphi's existence, but Set uses a spell to clear the miasma away. Everyone is shocked when Leonhart reverts to human form before their eyes.
22	"Flight and the Justice's Ambition"; Transliteration: "Tōbō to Hōkan no Yabō" (Japanese: 逃亡と法官の野望)	Shigeki Awai; Momo Shimizu	Seishi Minakami	Ken'ichi Nishida	September 14, 2023
As the citizens riot, Sariphi, Bennu, and Cy get Leonhart away and they take shelter in the crystal cave. Set explains to Anubis that Leonhart is a bastard child of the previous king and a human, while he is the son of the king and an official concubine, meaning he has royal blood. Set becomes the acting king and immediately orders the various beast races segregated with the non-mammalian races persecuted. Jormungand is arrested for remaining loyal to Leonhart, but Amit helps him escape and they go on the run. While looking for food, Sariphi saves an amphibian child from being beaten by guards, then Clops and Lante arrive and defeat them. As Lante fills her in, she realizes she left the diary behind and proposes retrieving it to prove Leonhart is legitimate. Leonhart has given up hope and wants to run away to Yoana, but Sariphi reprimands him and restores his courage. Jormungand tells Amit he owes Leonhart for accepting him despite anti-reptilian prejudice. They find the others and make a plan. Leonhart and Jormungand will distract the guards and Set while Sariphi, Lante, and Bennu retrieve the diary. The two attack the guards while Set thinks Leonhart is insane to come back while still in human form.
23	"The Archpriest and the Truth About the King"; Transliteration: "Shinkanchō to Ō no Shinjitsu" (Japanese: 神官長と王の真実)	Teppei Takeya	Seishi Minakami	Kōichi Takada	September 21, 2023
Sariphi, Lante, and Bennu find a bizarre looking, wounded creature chained up in the palace. He is Archpriest Capel, who has become undead and imprisoned by Set. He telepathically tells Sariphi that when the previous king's wife died of illness without birthing an heir, he told Capel to seek his exiled twin. Capel found the twin had died, but slept with a human and had a son. He took the newborn and passed him off as the king's son, Leonhart. Capel reveals another secret before turning to dust. Set easily restrains Leonhart and Jormungand with magic and crucifies Leonhart before the people. Anubis captures Sariphi, Lante, and Bennu before interrogating Sariphi on whether she knew Leonhart was part human and if she would still love him if he wasn't, and she says she would. Anubis drags Sariphi over and Set orders him to kill her, but he stabs Set instead, affirming his loyalty to Leonhart and breaking his restraints. Set wounds him in retaliation, but Galois, Joz, and their forces arrive to defend Leonhart and the others. Set is infuriated when messengers say Sarbul and Maasya have rejected his rule and forces from Yoana led by Ocelot and Ilya are defending the non-mammalians from his enforcers. Amit joins Lante and they destroy the ward keeping the miasma cleared. When Sariphi calls Set unworthy to be king, he angrily blasts her into the sky. Leonhart leaps to catch her with Gwiber just as he returns to beast form.
24	"A Queen and the Future of the Kingdom"; Transliteration: "Kisaki to Ōkoku no Mirai" (Japanese: 妃と王国の未来)	Yasuo Iwamoto	Seishi Minakami	Kōichi Takada	September 28, 2023
Set claims Leonhart returning to beast form changes nothing as everyone already knows the truth, but Leonhart says Set is unworthy because he divided the people instead of protecting them. Furious, Set roars that his mother died penniless despite birthing a prince and attacks with magic, but Leonhart blocks his spells. A stone Capel gave Sariphi plays a recording that reveals the previous king was sterile and Set's father was someone random. Unable to believe he is not royalty, Set attempts a big spell, but his body reaches its limits and breaks down. As Anubis recovers from his wounds, he decides to leave to atone for betraying Leonhart, but Leonhart assures that they are still friends and convinces him to stay. Jormungand and Lante deal with Set's loyalists. Sariphi finally recovers the diary and lets Leonhart read it. It says Leonhart's mother met his father, the king's exiled twin, after a battle and they fell in love. His father died of his wounds while she was pregnant and she wanted to name him Richard. After Capel took him away, she wanted to let him know that he was loved. Jormungand declares his love for Amit. Leonhart officially announces the peace treaty with Yoana and Sariphi as his queen and promises that even with human blood, he will protect them, to the cheers of the crowd. Leonhart and Sariphi officially marry with everyone, including Ilya, approving. Several years later, they have a son named Richard who can switch between beast and human form at will. While bored with a lesson from Anubis, Richard asks him about his parents, so Anubis tells the story of how Sariphi came to them.

=== Musical ===
A musical adaptation is set to run in Tokyo and Osaka in 2025. Yukio Ueshima is writing the screenplay, directing, and choreographing, Sayaka Asai is the lyricist, and Shigeru Yahata is in charge of music. It will star Daigo Kato as Leonhart, Kokoro Kuge as Sariphi, Tomoya Fukui as Anubis, Waku Kyoten as Jormungand, Hikaru Imamaki as Lanteveldt, Yume Nagatoshi as Amit, Judai Shirakashi as Fenrir, Gaku Matsuda as Gleipnir, and Yūsuke Yata as Set.

== Reception ==
Rebecca Silverman from Anime News Network said that "Beauty and the Beast is alive and well in Sacrificial Princess and the King of Beasts – it's almost a by-the-book retelling of the classic fairy tale. That's definitely part of the appeal of this initial volume, because the Beauty of folklore isn't always as spunky as she could be, often winning over the Beast with her gentle ways and calm demeanor." Richard Gutierrez of The Fandom Post saw the story as more than a retelling, saying that the author "has sincerely crafted a narrative which engenders the reader on many fronts", complimenting the pair's relationship and its innocence. Sean Gaffney of A Case Suitable for Treatment noted that the manga has nostalgic scenes that reference other series, liking the characterization of the characters and especially the protagonist, but was wary of her young age.
