= Angel Dog =

2011 film

- Film poster
- Directed by: Robin Nations
- Written by: Robin Nations
- Produced by: Kevin Nations
- Starring: Jon Michael Davis; Farah White; Richard Dillard; Mona Lee Fultz; Maurice Ripke; Ashley Hallford
- Cinematography: Kevin Nations
- Edited by: Kevin Nations
- Music by: Peter Himmelman
- Production company: The Nations
- Distributed by: Screen Media Films
- Release date: March 19, 2011 (International Family Film Festival)
- Running time: 90 minutes
- Country: United States
- Language: English

Angel Dog is a 2011 family film about how a dog named Cooper, a survivor of a car accident, bonds with Jake and helps him get over a tragic loss. This film is written and directed by Robin Nations and produced and cinematography by Kevin Nations. The two are a husband and wife team that go by The Nations. The film's score was composed and performed by singer-songwriter Peter Himmelman.

The film premiered in Los Angeles, California, at the 2011 International Family Film Festival on March 19, 2011.

== Background ==
After The Nations produced and directed their second film, Leftovers, the husband and wife team, inspired by their love of dogs, set out to make a family dog film. Angel Dog marked their first push towards their mission to “bring back family movie night”.

== Premise ==
A dog named Cooper is the only survivor of a deadly car accident where Jake lost his wife and children. Jake dislikes dogs and vents his anger on the dog for surviving. However, a bond forms between Jake and Cooper that gives him some solace.

== Cast ==
- Jon Michael Davis as Jake Bryant
- Farah White as Caroline Mason
- Richard Dillard as Seth
- Mona Lee Fultz as Bobbie
- Maurice Ripke as Trey
- Ashley Hallford as Nita

== Reception ==
Angel Dog received a 5 Dove rating from The Dove Foundation, which is the foundation's highest honor possible. Reviewer Edwin L. Carpenter stated, “Angel Dog is a movie which adults, along with kids, will enjoy. Don’t let the title fool you. The movie deals with something everyone can relate to: death and loss, and the subsequent grieving process. Yet “Cooper”, a stray, is a lovable dog who seems to have a mission: to help those who are lonely following a loss. Then he moves on to the next need.” Tracey Moore from Common Sense Media gave three stars from five in her review, commenting: ... "Angel Dog is a sweet, heartfelt film about loss that reinforces the value and importance of moving on, and suggests that people (and pets) may all enter our lives for a reason. It offers important positive messages about kindness, compassion, and creating the space for a person to grieve in a healthy, unrushed way. This is contrasted by showing what it's like when people don't move on, and are stuck in a lifetime of pain and unable to let go. That said, it's a heavy dose of real-world suffering .."
