= Jurassic Shark =

Attack of the Jurassic Shark
- DVD cover
- Directed by: Brett Kelly
- Written by: David A. Lloyd; Trevor Payer
- Produced by: Anne-Marie Frigon
- Starring: Emanuelle Carriere; Christine Emes; Celine Filion; Angela Parent; Duncan Milloy; Phil Dukarsky; Kyle Martellacci; Kevin Preece; Joshua Gilbert Crosby; Jurgen Vollrath
- Cinematography: Amber Peters
- Music by: Christopher Nickel
- Production companies: Tomcat Films; Dudez Productions
- Distributed by: Brett Kelly Entertainment
- Release date: April 20, 2012 (India)
- Running time: 75 minutes
- Country: Canada
- Language: English

Attack of the Jurassic Shark (also called Jurassic Shark) is a 2012 Canadian independent adventure horror-thriller film project directed by Brett Kelly. It parodies two Steven Spielberg–directed films at once: Jaws and Jurassic Park.

A sequel, Jurassic Shark 2: Aquapocalypse, was released in 2021. A second sequel was released in 2023, titled Jurassic Shark 3: Seavenge. A third sequel was released in 2026, titled Jurassic Shark 4: Metal Machine Mako.

== Plot ==
A megalodon (prehistoric shark) is accidentally unleashed after an oil rig in the middle of a small island on a lake drills too far into the lake floor. The resulting malfunction also creates an explosion. The shark eats two girls before attacking a group of art thieves, in a boat, which consists of Barb, Rich, Doug, Jerry, and Jack. Jack is eaten while the others escape onto the island, although they drop the painting into the water. Jerry is sent in to get it, although fails to do so, and is killed by the shark.

Meanwhile, a group of college students consisting of Jill, Tia, Kristen, and Mike attempt to get onto the island so Jill can find the rig, which she hopes will help with her essay on pollution. However, the shark attacks their boat, and kills Mike while the others reach shore. They meet up with the thieves, who claim to be tourists, and spend the night on the island. The next morning, they find the facility, as well as the only survivor of the explosion, Dr. Lincoln Grant. Barb, Rich, and Doug then reveal their true identities, and force Grant into the water to retrieve the painting, although he is quickly eaten. Jill, Tia, and Kristen use this time to hide, although the thieves chase them, and Kristen is eaten in the ensuing chaos while Jill and Tia are recaptured.

The next morning, Barb has Jill and Tia dive for the painting while Rich distracts the shark with dynamite. The girls throw a rock at Rich, which gives the dynamite enough time to explode in his hand, killing him. They then throw a rock at Doug, and he ends up in the water, where he is killed. The girls get hold of a gun, and end up in a standoff, although the shark jumps out of the water, and eats Barb. Jill then uses the remaining dynamite to kill the shark, and she and Tia leave the island. Meanwhile, two fishermen are eaten alive by another megalodon, hinting that the threat is not over.

== Cast ==
- Emanuelle Carriere as Jill
- Christine Emes as Tia
- Celine Filion as Kristen
- Angela Parent as Barb
- Duncan Milloy as Rich
- Phil Dukarsky as Doug
- Kyle Martellacci as Mike
- Joshua Gilbert Crosby as Jack
- Kevin Preece as Jerry
- Jurgen Vollrath as Dr. Lincoln Grant
- George Hudson as Luke
- Kala Gray as Brittany
- Sarah Mosher as Tiffany
- Sherry Thurig as Scientist
- Jody Haucke as Chairman
- Real Darren Stevens as Fisherman 1
- Ian Quick as Fisherman 2
- Kimberly Wolfe as Beer Girl

== Reception ==
Fangoria called it an "Ottawa-shot sharksploitationer" with a mood that "is pure fun, akin to recent marine-life-run-amok fare [such] as Piranha 3D and Sharktopus". Conversely, Alex DiGiovanna of Move Buzzers panned the film, noting that with VOD or direct to DVD films about giant creatures attacking folks on a beach "you can expect them to be funny, in a terrible sort of way while also having some sort of added entertainment value. Too bad that's not the case with Brett Kelly's wannabe Jaws meets Jurassic Park Megalodon feature, Attack of the Jurassic Shark". He offered "when I say this movie is one of the worst pieces of cinema that my eyes had the misfortune of viewing, I truly mean it." He explained "I love terrible horror movies, I think they're hilarious and while this one had a few of those moments, it couldn't live up to its potential." He noted that viewer expectations would be subverted by only "average girls in bikinis, terrible prop work, awful CG (for the most part), pathetic death sequences, a flying shark and a really long, dialogue-free walking montage."

Dread Central spoke negatively about production's first efforts at a film trailer, calling it "underwhelming" as "a trailer for a killer shark movie with very little shark in it". Comparing the early trailer to the later, they expanded by writing "the differences between the two trailers should be a lesson to indie filmmakers not to release the first trailer for their movie to the public before they're really ready to show off their movie goods."

JoBlo spoke somewhat more positively about the later trailer which included footage of the purported megalodon and predicted the film "has potential to become something special." After DVD release, they found the film and premise to be "ridiculous shit".

Aint It Cool News panned the film for poor CGI effects making its shark look cartoonish. They expanded it was "Amazing how bad the effects are here," and that the film was "an exercise in how not to make a low budget flick".
