= Wasao =

2011 film

- Directed by: Yoshinari Nishikori
- Written by: Hirotoshi Kobayashi
- Starring: Hiroko Yakushimaru, Masahiro Komoto, Sawa Suzuki
- Distributed by: Toei Company
- Release date: 5 March 2011 (Japan)
- Country: Japan
- Language: Japanese

Wasao (わさお) is a 2011 Japanese film that is based on a true story of an abandoned Akita dog.

== Cast ==
- Hiroko Yakushimaru as Setsuko
- Masahiro Komoto
- Sawa Suzuki
- Jun Yoshinaga
- Daisuke Shima
- Masaki Izawa
- Toshinori Omi
- Mansaku Fuwa
- Koichi Ueda
- Shiro Sano
- Takashi Sasano
- Mitsuru Hirata
