= Hard Knock Life =

Hard Knock Life may refer to:

- "It's the Hard Knock Life", a song from the musical Annie
- Vol. 2... Hard Knock Life, a 1998 album by Jay-Z
  - "Hard Knock Life (Ghetto Anthem)", a song from the album, which samples the showtune from Annie
