= King of Beasts =

2018 American documentary film

- Film poster
- Directed by: Tomer Almagor; Nadav Harel
- Starring: Aaron Neilson
- Distributed by: Gravitas Ventures
- Release date: 2018
- Running time: 85 minutes
- Country: United States
- Language: English

King of Beasts is a 2018 American documentary film about lion trophy hunting in Tanzania. It follows the hunter Aaron Neilson as he tries to kill his 14th lion. The film had its premiere in 2018 at the Oldenburg International Film Festival in northern Germany.

== Production ==
King of Beasts was directed by Tomer Almagor and Nadav Harel, who worked on the film for six years. The filmmakers wanted to show the animal rights side and the side of the hunters. It was always intended to have a lion hunter be the focus of the film, but it was not known that it was going to be about Aaron Neilson. The film follows Neilson from Colorado to Tanzania to hunt animals over a few weeks, with his main purpose being to kill a 14th lion. There are few animal deaths shown, including the carcasses of a buffalo and a hippo being used for bait. It is also about Tanzanian locals hunting lions for money or food.

The directors make no commentary of what is happening on-screen for much of the film. An ending title card states that the film was "made with the support of the Humane Society of the US", while other title cards showed that the filmmakers were for animal conservation instead of trophy hunting. It was filmed during the same month as the killing of Cecil the lion.

== Release ==
In 2018, the film had its premiere at the Oldenburg International Film Festival in northern Germany. The film's distributor is Gravitas Ventures. It was released on DVD and Blu-ray on January 29, 2019.

== Reception ==
Jessica Baxter, writing for Hammer to Nail, wrote, "Neilson gets plenty of time on his soap box but, as with most divisive documentaries, viewers aren't going to be swayed to one side or the other. Hunters and animal lovers alike will feel validated by King of Beasts". Neil Young of The Hollywood Reporter concluded their review with: "But this is otherwise a work of admirable journalistic seriousness, one that goes about its business with a clear-eyed precision that even Neilson and his chums should grudgingly respect".
