= Shark Attack 2 =

- Directed by: David Worth
- Written by: Scott Devine; William Hooke
- Produced by: Marlow De Mardt; Danny Lerner; Brigid Olen
- Starring: Thorsten Kaye; Daniel Alexander; Nikita Ager
- Cinematography: Yossi Wein
- Edited by: Irit Raz
- Music by: Mark Morgan
- Production company: Nu Image Films
- Distributed by: Lionsgate Home Entertainment & Star Cinema
- Release dates: December 5, 2000 (United States); January 17, 2001 (Philippines); August 14, 2015 (South Africa)
- Running time: 88 minutes
- Countries: United States; South Africa; Philippines
- Language: English

Shark Attack 2 is a 2000 direct-to-video horror film. The film follows the mutant sharks from Shark Attack who attack Cape Town. In the film, a shark expert (Thorsten Kaye) and a flamboyant Australian marine hunter (Daniel Alexander) team up to destroy a group of white sharks mutating into a deadlier breed. The film was directed by David Worth and stars Thorsten Kaye and Nikita Ager.

== Plot ==
While diving near a shipwreck off Cape Town, South Africa, sisters Amy (Caroline Bruins) and Samantha Peterson (Nikita Ager) are attacked by a great white shark; Samantha survives, while Amy is killed. One week later, Dr. Nick Harris (Thorsten Kaye) and his boat crew, brothers Mark (Morne Visser) and Tom Miller (Alistair Cloete), capture the shark and install it as a new attraction at Water World - a Sea World rip-off. When the shark kills a staff member and escapes, Nick and Samantha go to hunt it, but are seemingly beaten by Australian shark hunter Roy Bishop (Daniel Alexander), who proudly displays a shark he has killed. A late night search, however, reveals six great whites living in a cave near the beach, suggesting they have a much bigger problem.

Meanwhile, Morton (Warrick Grier) has found evidence of advanced metabolic activity in samples from both the escaped shark and the shark that Bishop caught, as well as confirming they are two different sharks. In trying to find its cause, he stumbles upon reports of Dr. Craven's experiments, and discovers that the sharks involved were all pregnant females. The team realize that these are the offspring of Craven's sharks, and that the upcoming Cape Classic surfing contest is a prime target.

Nick and Samantha try to convince the Mayor to cancel the Cape Classic, but are rebuffed. Instead, Bishop is ordered to kill the sharks, which he plans to do after getting some footage. However, the sharks attack Bishop's shark cages, forcing Bishop and his two cameramen into open water; Bishop is the only survivor. The sharks then make their way to the surfing contest, killing five, including Mark, and wounding Tom and three others, in full view of the crowded beach. Now spurred into action, the Mayor orders Nick, Samantha, and Bishop to take care of the sharks for good.

After finding common ground, Nick and Bishop head to the sharks' cave in a small submarine, hoping to plant a bomb that will destroy all the sharks at once. However, the sharks attack and disable the submarine, causing Samantha to dive down to assist. She succeeds in freeing them, and Bishop sets the now-armed submarine to pilot itself into the cave. The plan seems to work, with most of the sharks following the sub, but Bishop is grabbed by another shark and dragged into the cave with them. Nick and Samantha head for the surface, but are attacked by the final shark, which they kill with a shot to the head. Moments later, the bomb detonates, killing the sharks, and Bishop surfaces, injured, but alive.

== Cast ==
- Thorsten Kaye as Dr. Nick Harris
- Daniel Alexander as Roy Bishop
- Nikita Ager as Samantha Peterson
- Caroline Bruins as Amy Peterson
- Danny Keogh as Michael Francisco
- Warrick Grier as Morton
- Morne Visser as Mark Miller
- Alistair Cloete as Tom Miller
- Rory Atkinson as Hootie
- Anton Vorster as Pierson
- Sean Higgs as T.J.
- Ian Jepson as Jeff
- Marc Derman as Kenny
- Stephen Fry as Chuck
- Sean Michaels as News Anchor

== Reception ==
The film has been critically panned.

G Noel. Gross of DVD Talk gave the film a negative review and said: "As subtle as a kick in the pants. Utterly no concept of suspense. Grossly unoriginal without the benefit of even being amusing -- intentionally, or otherwise".

Popcorn Pictures gave the film 4 out of 10 criticizing the characters and CGI: "You'd assume that I hated Shark Attack 2 from the overall negative review I've given it here. It's not as bad as I'm making it sound, though that is coming from someone who watches so many low quality films that it's hard to make a valid case for any sane person to watch it. Better than the first one by a fair distance but still coming a long way off being classed as watchable".

== Sequel ==
The film was followed by Shark Attack 3 in 2002.
