= Shark Attack (film) =

- Official DVD cover
- Written by: Scott Devine; William Hooke
- Directed by: Bob Misiorowski; Chris Webster
- Starring: Casper Van Dien; Jenny McShane; Bentley Mitchum; Ernie Hudson; Cordell McQueen; Chris Olley; Jacob Makgoba; Paul Ditchfield
- Music by: Serge Colbert
- Original language: English

Production
- Executive producers: Danny Dimbort; Avi Lerner; Trevor Short
- Producer: Mandy Branch
- Running time: 95 minutes

Original release
- Network: HBO
- Release: May 28, 1999

Related
- Shark Attack 2 (2000)

Shark Attack is a 1999 American television action thriller film by Lionsgate that first premiered on HBO directed by Bob Misiorowski and starring Casper Van Dien, Jenny McShane and Ernie Hudson. In a once tranquil African fishing village, a marine biologist searches for answers when his friend becomes a victim in a series of brutal shark attacks.

== Plot ==
When marine biologist Steven McKray learns that a friend died in a mysterious shark attack in South Africa, he decides to find out what really happened. Upon arriving in the village, he meets Lawrence Rhodes, a local hotel owner, and scientist Miles Craven, who informs Steven of the mysterious increase in shark attacks in the area. When Steven teams up with his late friend's sister for a fact-finding dive, they make a surprising discovery.

== Cast ==
- Casper Van Dien as Steven McKray
- Ernie Hudson as Lawrence Rhodes
- Jenny McShane as Corinne Desantis
- Cordell McQueen as Marc Desantis
- Bentley Mitchum as Dr. Miles Craven
- Chris Olley as Police Chief
- Jacob Makgoba as Machete Policeman
- Paul Ditchfield as Professor Bookman
- Anton Dekker as Jan
- Tony Caprari as Mani
- Dave Ridley as Mr. Hacker
- Simo Magwase as Tanka
- Mike Mvelase as Mabunda
- Kwesi Malinga as Mrs. Rhodes
- Twelopele Tsotsotso as Tadesse
- Douglas Bristow as Dr. Puri
- Caroline Barkhuizen as Night Nurse
- Pepsy Mahunisi as Elder Leader
- Eloise Cupido as Hotel Desk Clerk
- Bradley Meyer as Boy In The Boat
- Roly Jansen as Fishing Tourist On The Boat

== Reception ==
On Rotten Tomatoes the film has an approval rating of 0% based on reviews from 5 critics.

Scott Weinberg of eFilmCritic.com gave it 2/5 and called it "hilariously bad (and therefore entertaining) Z- grade shark horror". Michael Dequina at TheMovieReport.com was critical of the film saying "the title takes a back seat to some boring conspiracy mumbo-jumbo".

== Sequels ==
Two direct-to-video sequels followed Shark Attack. Shark Attack 2 was released in 2000, while Shark Attack 3 was released in 2002. Shark Attack 2 briefly mentions the events of the first film while Shark Attack 3 ignores the first two films entirely and acts as a stand-alone sequel to them.

== See also ==
- List of killer shark films
