= Hard Knocks (1979 film) =

- Directed by: David Worth
- Written by: Michael Christian
- Produced by: Michael Christian
- Starring: Michael Christian; Keenan Wynn; Henry Brandon; Donna Wilkes; John Crawford; Josette Banzet
- Release date: 1979
- Country: United States
- Language: English

Hard Knocks (also known as Mid-Knight Rider and Hollywood Knight) is a 1979 American film starring Michael Christian and directed by David Worth.

== Plot ==
Guy, a young male prostitute, comes to Hollywood and encounters much more than he bargained for.

== Cast ==
- Michael Christian - Guy
- Josette Banzet - Cherie
- Keenan Wynn - Jed
- Donna Wilkes - Chris
- John Crawford - Josh
- Henry Brandon - Curley
