= List of feature film series with three entries =

This is a list of film series that have three entries.

Key:

- (A) – Film series is 100% animated
- (a) – Film series is not 100% animated and has live action in a sequel or prequel
- (TV) – made-for-TV
- (V) – direct-to-video
- (*) – TV series attached

== 0-9 ==
- 7 Dwarves (a)
  1. 7 Dwarves – Men Alone in the Wood (2004)
  2. 7 Dwarves: The Forest Is Not Enough (2006)
  3. The 7th Dwarf (2014) (A)
- 9½ Weeks
  1. 9½ Weeks (1986)
  2. Love in Paris (1997) (V)
  3. The First 9½ Weeks (1998) (V) (prequel)
- 11/11/11
  1. 11/11/11 (2011)
  2. 12/12/12 (2012)
  3. 13/13/13 (2013)
- 12 Rounds
  1. 12 Rounds (2009)
  2. 12 Rounds 2: Reloaded (2013) (V)
  3. 12 Rounds 3: Lockdown (2015) (V)
- 47 Meters Down
  1. 47 Meters Down (2017)
  2. 47 Meters Down: Uncaged (2019)
  3. 47 Meters Down: The Wreck (TBA)
- 48 Hrs.
  1. 48 Hrs. (1982)
  2. Andar Baahar (1984) (remake)
  3. Another 48 Hrs. (1990)
- 2012
  1. 2012: Doomsday (2008) (V)
  2. 2012: Supernova (2009) (V)
  3. 2012: Ice Age (2011) (V)

== A ==
- ABCs of Death
  1. The ABCs of Death (2012)
  2. ABCs of Death 2 (2014)
  3. ABC's of Death 2½ (2016)
- Abel Gagné
  1. Don't Let It Kill You (1967)
  2. The Old Country Where Rimbaud Died (1977)
  3. Now or Never (1998)
- Ace Ventura *
  1. Ace Ventura: Pet Detective (1994)
  2. Ace Ventura: When Nature Calls (1995)
  3. Ace Ventura Jr.: Pet Detective (2009) (TV)
- The Adam Trilogy
  1. Yarınsız Adam (aka Man Without Tomorrow) (1976)
  2. Satılmış Adam (aka Sold Man) (1977)
  3. Yıkılmayan Adam (aka Indestructible Man) (1978)
- Adventures of a...
  1. Adventures of a Taxi Driver (1976)
  2. Adventures of a Private Eye (1977)
  3. Adventures of a Plumber's Mate (1978)
- Aesop's Fables Maugham Concerto Trilogy
  1. Quartet (1948)
  2. Trio (1950)
  3. Encore (1951)
- Ai to Makoto
  1. Ai to Makoto (1974)
  2. Zoku Ai to Makoto (1975)
  3. Ai to Makoto Kanketsu-hen (1976)
- Ajin
  1. Ajin: Shōdō (2015)
  2. Ajin: Shōtotsu (2016)
  3. Ajin: Shōgeki (2016)
- Aktan Abdykalykov trilogy
  1. Sel'kincek (1994)
  2. Beshkempir (1998)
  3. Maimil (2001)
- Alex Cross
  1. Kiss the Girls (1997)
  2. Along Came a Spider (2001)
  3. Alex Cross (2012)
- Alex McGregor
  1. First Daughter (1999) (TV)
  2. First Target (2000) (TV)
  3. First Shot (2002) (TV)
- Alienation
  1. L'Avventura (1960)
  2. La Notte (1961)
  3. L'Eclisse (1962)
- All Dogs Go to Heaven * (A)
  1. All Dogs Go to Heaven (1989)
  2. All Dogs Go to Heaven 2 (1996)
  3. An All Dogs Christmas Carol (1998) (TV)
- All of My Heart
  1. All of My Heart (2015) (TV)
  2. All of My Heart: Inn Love (2017) (TV)
  3. All of My Heart: The Wedding (2018) (TV)
- An Almost Perfect Affair
  1. An Almost Perfect Affair (1995)
  2. An Almost Perfect Divorce (1997)
  3. An Almost Perfect Wedding (1999)
- Alvin Purple *
  1. Alvin Purple (1973)
  2. Alvin Purple Rides Again (1974)
  3. Melvin, Son of Alvin (1984)
- Anchorman
  1. Anchorman: The Legend of Ron Burgundy (2004)
  2. Wake Up, Ron Burgundy: The Lost Movie (2004) (V)
  3. Anchorman 2: The Legend Continues (2013)
- Angels in the Outfield
  1. Angels in the Outfield (1994)
  2. Angels in the Endzone (1997) (TV)
  3. Angels in the Infield (2000) (TV)
- The Angry Birds Movie (A)
  1. The Angry Birds Movie (2016) (A)
  2. The Angry Birds Movie 2 (2019) (A)
  3. The Angry Birds Movie 3 (2026) (A)
- The Animation Show
  1. Animation Show: Volume One (2003) (V)
  2. Animation Show: Volume Two (2005) (V)
  3. Animation Show: Volume Three (2007) (V)
- Animerama (A)
  1. A Thousand and One Nights (1969)
  2. Cleopatra (1970)
  3. Belladonna of Sadness (1973)
- Ant-Man
  1. Ant-Man (2015)
  2. Ant-Man and the Wasp (2018)
  3. Ant-Man and the Wasp: Quantumania (2023)
- Antboy
  1. Antboy (2013)
  2. Antboy: Revenge of the Red Fury (2014)
  3. Antboy 3 (2016)
- Ape vs. Monster
  1. Ape vs. Monster (2022) (V)
  2. Ape vs. Mecha Ape (2023) (V)
  3. Ape x Mecha Ape: New World Order (2024) (V)
- The Ape Woman
  1. Captive Wild Woman (1943)
  2. Jungle Woman (1944)
  3. The Jungle Captive (1945)
- The Apple Dumpling Gang *
  1. The Apple Dumpling Gang (1975)
  2. The Apple Dumpling Gang Rides Again (1979)
  3. Tales of the Apple Dumpling Gang (1982) (TV)
- The Apu Trilogy
  1. Pather Panchali (1955)
  2. Aparajito (1957)
  3. The World of Apu (1959)
- Armour of God
  1. Armour of God (1986)
  2. Armour of God II: Operation Condor (1991)
  3. CZ12 (2012)
- Arsène Lupin
  1. The Adventures of Arsène Lupin (1957)
  2. Signé Arsène Lupin (1959)
  3. Arsène Lupin Versus Arsène Lupin (1962)
- Art of the Devil
  1. Art of the Devil (2004)
  2. Art of the Devil 2 (2005)
  3. Art of the Devil 3 (2008)
- The Art of War
  1. The Art of War (2000)
  2. The Art of War II: Betrayal (2008) (V)
  3. The Art of War III: Retribution (2009) (V)
- Arthur
  1. Arthur and the Invisibles (2006)
  2. Arthur and the Revenge of Maltazard (2009)
  3. Arthur 3: The War of the Two Worlds (2010)
- Asiong Aksaya
  1. Asiong Aksaya (1977)
  2. Awat na, Asiong Aksaya! (1979)
  3. Eto na naman si Asiong Aksaya! (1980)
- Atlas Shrugged
  1. Atlas Shrugged: Part I (2011)
  2. Atlas Shrugged: Part II (2012)
  3. Atlas Shrugged Part III: Who Is John Galt? (2014)
- Au Pair
  1. Au Pair (1999) (TV)
  2. Au Pair II: The Fairytale Continues (2001) (TV)
  3. Au Pair 3: Adventure in Paradise (2009) (TV)
- L'Auberge espagnole
  1. L'Auberge espagnole (2002)
  2. Les Poupées russes (2005)
  3. Casse-tête chinois (2013)
- August Underground
  1. August Underground (2001)
  2. August Underground's Mordum (2003)
  3. August Underground's Penance (2007)
- Austin Powers
  1. Austin Powers: International Man of Mystery (1997)
  2. Austin Powers: The Spy Who Shagged Me (1999)
  3. Austin Powers in Goldmember (2002)
- Auton
  1. Auton (1997) (V)
  2. Auton 2: Sentinel (1998) (V)
  3. Auton 3 (1999) (V)
- Avatar
  1. Avatar (2009)
  2. Avatar: The Way of Water (2022)
  3. Avatar: Fire and Ash (2025)

== B ==
- Bab
  1. Bab's Diary (1917)
  2. Bab's Burglar (1917)
  3. Bab's Matinee Idol (1917)
- Baby Ama
  1. Bitayin si... Baby Ama! (1976)
  2. Anak ni Baby Ama (1990)
  3. Hari ng Selda: Anak ni Baby Ama 2 (2002)
- Back to the Future *
  1. Back to the Future (1985)
  2. Back to the Future Part II (1989)
  3. Back to the Future Part III (1990)
- Bayaniverse
  1. Heneral Luna (2015)
  2. Goyo: Ang Batang Heneral (2018)
  3. Quezon (TBA)
- Bagdad Cafe *
  1. Sugarbaby (1985)
  2. Bagdad Cafe (1987)
  3. Rosalie Goes Shopping (1989)
- Balto (A)
  1. Balto (1995)
  2. Balto II: Wolf Quest (2002) (V)
  3. Balto III: Wings of Change (2004) (V)
- Barefoot Gen *
  1. Barefoot Gen (1976)
  2. Barefoot Gen: Explosion of Tears (1977)
  3. Barefoot Gen Part 3: Battle of Hiroshima (1980)
- The Barrytown Trilogy
  1. The Commitments (1991)
  2. The Snapper (1993) (TV)
  3. The Van (1996)
- Basket Case
  1. Basket Case (1982)
  2. Basket Case 2 (1990)
  3. Basket Case 3: The Progeny (1991)
- Batman (Note: A series of films, based on and a continuation of the 1966 TV series.) **
  1. Batman (1966)
  2. Batman: Return of the Caped Crusaders (2016) (V)
  3. Batman vs. Two-Face (2017) (V)
- Batman Unlimited
  1. Batman Unlimited: Animal Instincts (2015) (V)
  2. Batman Unlimited: Monster Mayhem (2015) (V)
  3. Batman Unlimited: Mechs vs. Mutants (2016) (V)
- Baywatch
  1. Baywatch the Movie: Forbidden Paradise (1995) (V)
  2. Baywatch: White Thunder at Glacier Bay (1998) (V)
  3. Baywatch: Hawaiian Wedding (2003) (TV)
- B.D. - Brigada Diverse
  1. Brigada Diverse intra în actiune (1970)
  2. Brigada Diverse în alertă! (1971)
  3. B.D. la munte si la mare (1971)
- Beastmaster *
  1. The Beastmaster (1982)
  2. Beastmaster 2: Through the Portal of Time (1991) (V)
  3. Beastmaster III: The Eye of Braxus (1996) (TV)
- Before Trilogy
  1. Before Sunrise (1995)
  2. Before Sunset (2004)
  3. Before Midnight (2013)
- Belle & Sebastian
  1. Belle and Sebastian (2013)
  2. Belle & Sebastian: The Adventure Continues (2015)
  3. Belle et Sébastien 3, pour la vie (2018)
- Berserk: The Golden Age Arc *
  1. Berserk: The Golden Age Arc I: The Egg of the King (2012)
  2. Berserk: The Golden Age Arc II: The Battle for Doldrey (2012)
  3. Berserk: The Golden Age Arc III: The Advent (2013)
- A Better Tomorrow
  1. A Better Tomorrow (1986)
  2. A Better Tomorrow II (1987)
  3. A Better Tomorrow III: Love & Death in Saigon (1989) (prequel)
- The Beverly Hillbillies *
  1. Return of the Beverly Hillbillies (1981) (TV)
  2. The Legend of the Beverly Hillbillies (1993) (TV)
  3. The Beverly Hillbilles (1993)
- Beverly Hills Chihuahua
  1. Beverly Hills Chihuahua (2008)
  2. Beverly Hills Chihuahua 2 (2011) (V)
  3. Beverly Hills Chihuahua 3: Viva la Fiesta! (2012) (V)
- Beyond the Door
  1. Beyond the Door (1974)
  2. Beyond the Door II (1977) (unofficial)
  3. Beyond the Door III (1989) (unofficial)
- Big Momma
  1. Big Momma's House (2000)
  2. Big Momma's House 2 (2006)
  3. Big Mommas: Like Father, Like Son (2011)
- Bikini Summer
  1. Bikini Summer (1991)
  2. Bikini Summer II (1992)
  3. Bikini Summer III: South Beach Heat (1997)
- Bill & Ted **
  1. Bill & Ted's Excellent Adventure (1989)
  2. Bill & Ted's Bogus Journey (1991)
  3. Bill & Ted Face the Music (2020)
- Birdemic
  1. Birdemic: Shock and Terror (2010)
  2. Birdemic 2: The Resurrection (2013)
  3. Birdemic 3: Sea Eagle (2022)
- Black Christmas
  1. Black Christmas (1974)
  2. Black Christmas (2006) (remake)
  3. Black Christmas (2019) (remake)
- The Black Stallion *
  1. The Black Stallion (1979)
  2. The Black Stallion Returns (1983)
  3. The Young Black Stallion (2003) (prequel)
- Black Triad Trilogy
  1. Shinjuku Triad Society (1995)
  2. Rainy Dog (1997)
  3. Ley Lines (1999)
- Blade *
  1. Blade (1998)
  2. Blade II (2002)
  3. Blade: Trinity (2004)
- Blair Witch
  1. The Blair Witch Project (1999)
  2. Book of Shadows: Blair Witch 2 (2000)
  3. Blair Witch (2016)
- BloodRayne
  1. BloodRayne (2005)
  2. BloodRayne 2: Deliverance (2007) (V)
  3. BloodRayne: The Third Reich (2011) (V)
- The Bloodthirsty Trilogy
  1. The Vampire Doll (1970)
  2. Lake of Dracula (1971)
  3. Evil of Dracula (1974)
- Bob Blake
  1. Two Gun Man from Harlem (1938)
  2. The Bronze Buckaroo (1939)
  3. Harlem Rides the Range (1939)
- The Boogeyman
  1. The Boogeyman (1980)
  2. Boogeyman II (1983) (V)
  3. Return of the Boogeyman (1994) (V)
- Boogeyman
  1. Boogeyman (2005)
  2. Boogeyman 2 (2007) (V)
  3. Boogeyman 3 (2008) (V)
- Børning
  1. Børning (2014)
  2. Børning 2 (2016)
  3. Børning 3 – Asphalt Burning (2020)
- Bourlivé víno
  1. Bourlivé víno (1976)
  2. Zralé víno (1981)
  3. Mladé víno (1986)
- The Brady Bunch Movie *
  1. The Brady Bunch Movie (1995)
  2. A Very Brady Sequel (1996)
  3. The Brady Bunch in the White House (2002) (TV)
- The Brave Little Toaster (A)
  1. The Brave Little Toaster (1987)
  2. The Brave Little Toaster to the Rescue (1997) (V)
  3. The Brave Little Toaster Goes to Mars (1998) (V)
- BRD Trilogy
  1. The Marriage of Maria Braun (1979)
  2. Veronika Voss (1982)
  3. Lola (1981)
- Brigade mondaine
  1. Victims of Vice (1978)
  2. Brigade mondaine : La secte de Marrakech (1979)
  3. Brigade mondaine : Vaudou aux Caraïbes (1980)
- Brighton Beach
  1. Brighton Beach Memoirs (1986)
  2. Biloxi Blues (1988)
  3. Broadway Bound (1992) (TV)
- Broken Arrow *
  1. Broken Arrow (1950)
  2. The Battle at Apache Pass (1952)
  3. Taza, Son of Cochise (1954)
- Les Bronzés
  1. Les Bronzés (1978)
  2. Les Bronzés Font du Ski (1979)
  3. Les Bronzés 3: Amis pour la vie (2006)
- Brüder
  1. Brüder (2002) (TV)
  2. Brüder II (2003) (TV)
  3. Brüder III – Auf dem Jakobsweg (2006) (TV)
- The Butterfly Effect
  1. The Butterfly Effect (2004)
  2. The Butterfly Effect 2 (2006) (V)
  3. The Butterfly Effect 3: Revelations (2009)

== C ==
- La Cage aux Folles
  1. La Cage aux Folles (1978)
  2. La Cage aux Folles II (1980)
  3. La Cage aux Folles 3: The Wedding (1985)
- Caged Heat
  1. Caged Heat (1974)
  2. Caged Heat II: Stripped of Freedom (1994)
  3. Caged Heat 3000 (1995)
- The Calcutta Trilogy (Mrinal Sen)
  1. Interview (1971)
  2. Calcutta 71 (1971)
  3. Padatik (The Guerilla Fighter) (1973)
- The Calcutta Trilogy (Satyajit Ray)
  1. Pratidwandi (The Adversary) (1971)
  2. Seemabaddha (Company Limited) (1971)
  3. Jana Aranya (The Middleman) (1976)
- Camp Rock
  1. Camp Rock (2008) (TV)
  2. Camp Rock 2: The Final Jam (2010) (TV)
  3. Camp Rock 3 (2026) (TV)
- Camping
  1. Camping (2006)
  2. Camping 2 (2010)
  3. Camping 3 (2016)
- Ruggero Deodato's Cannibal Trilogy
  1. Ultimo mondo cannibale (1977)
  2. Cannibal Holocaust (1980)
  3. Inferno in diretta (1985)
- The Cannonball Run
  1. The Cannonball Run (1981)
  2. Cannonball Run II (1984)
  3. Speed Zone (1989)
- Care Bears ** (A) (Theatrical films)
  1. The Care Bears Movie (1985)
  2. Care Bears Movie II: A New Generation (1986)
  3. The Care Bears Adventure in Wonderland (1987)
- Carlos Saura Dance Trilogy
  1. Bodas de sangre (1981)
  2. Carmen (1983)
  3. El amor brujo (1986)
- Carnosaur
  1. Carnosaur (1993)
  2. Carnosaur 2 (1995)
  3. Carnosaur 3: Primal Species (1996) (V)
- La Casa
  1. La Casa 3 (1988)
  2. La Casa 4 (1988)
  3. La Casa 5 (1990)
- Casino Raiders
  1. Casino Raiders (1989)
  2. No Risk, No Gain: Casino Raiders - The Sequel (1990)
  3. Casino Raiders II (1993)
- Cat Stevens & Hutch Bessy
  1. Dio perdona... Io no! (1967)
  2. I quattro dell'Ave Maria (1968)
  3. La collina degli stivali (1969)
- John Ford's Cavalry Trilogy
  1. Fort Apache (1948)
  2. She Wore a Yellow Ribbon (1949)
  3. Rio Grande (1950)
- Center Stage
  1. Center Stage (2000)
  2. Center Stage: Turn It Up (2008)
  3. Center Stage: On Pointe (2016) (TV)
- Chameleon
  1. Chameleon (1998) (TV)
  2. Chameleon II: Death Match (1999) (TV)
  3. Chameleon 3: Dark Angel (2000) (TV)
- Champignol
  1. Nous autres à Champignol (1957)
  2. The Gendarme of Champignol (1959)
  3. Le Caïd de Champignol (1966)
- Charles Bind
  1. Number One of the Secret Service (1977)
  2. Licensed to Love and Kill (1979)
  3. Number One Gun (1980)
- Charles Vine
  1. Licensed to Kill (1965)
  2. Where the Bullets Fly (1966)
  3. Somebody's Stolen Our Russian Spy (1967)
- Charlie's Angels **
  1. Charlie's Angels (2000)
  2. Charlie's Angels: Full Throttle (2003)
  3. Charlie's Angels (2019)
- Chihayafuru
  1. Chihayafuru: Kami no Ku (2016)
  2. Chihayafuru: Shimo no Ku (2016)
  3. Chihayafuru: Musubi (2018)
- A Chinese Odyssey *
  1. A Chinese Odyssey Part One: Pandora's Box (1994)
  2. A Chinese Odyssey Part Two: Cinderella (1994)
  3. A Chinese Odyssey Part Three (2016)
- Christmas in Evergreen
  1. Christmas in Evergreen (2017) (TV)
  2. Christmas in Evergreen: Letters to Santa (2018) (TV)
  3. Christmas in Evergreen: Tidings of Joy (2018) (TV)
- A Christmas Prince
  1. A Christmas Prince (2017)
  2. A Christmas Prince: The Royal Wedding (2018)
  3. A Christmas Prince: The Royal Baby (2019)
- Chronicle Mysteries
  1. Chronicle Mysteries: Recovered (2019) (TV)
  2. Chronicle Mysteries: The Wrong Man (2019) (TV)
  3. Chronicle Mysteries: Vines that Bind (2019) (TV)
- The Chronicles of Riddick
  1. Pitch Black (2000)
  2. The Chronicles of Riddick (2004)
  3. Riddick (2013)
- The Circuit
  1. The Circuit (2002)
  2. The Circuit 2: The Final Punch (2002) (V)
  3. The Circuit III: Final Flight (2006) (V)
- Per Fly's Class Trilogy
  1. Bænken (2000)
  2. Arven (2003)
  3. Drabet (2005)
- Mark L. Lester's Class of 19XX
  1. Class of 1984 (1982)
  2. Class of 1999 (1990)
  3. Class of 1999 II: The Substitute (1994)
- Class Reunion
  1. Class Reunion (2016)
  2. Klassikokkutulek 2: Pulmad ja matused (2018)
  3. Klassikokkutulek 3: Ristiisad (2019)
- Cleopatra Wong and Dynamite Johnson
  1. They Call Her Cleopatra Wong (1978)
  2. Dynamite Johnson (1978)
  3. Pay or Die a.k.a. Devil's Three (1979)
- Cloverfield
  1. Cloverfield (2008)
  2. 10 Cloverfield Lane (2016)
  3. The Cloverfield Paradox (2018) (V)
- Code Name: Wild Geese
  1. Code Name: Wild Geese (1984)
  2. Commando Leopard (1985)
  3. The Commander (1988)
- Le Cœur Des Hommes
  1. Le Cœur des hommes (2003)
  2. Le Cœur des hommes 2 (2007)
  3. Le Cœur des hommes 3 (2013)
- Cold Prey
  1. Cold Prey (2006)
  2. Cold Prey 2 (2008)
  3. Cold Prey 3 (2010) (prequel)
- Hou Hsiao-hsien's Coming-of-Age Trilogy
  1. A Summer at Grandpa's (1984)
  2. The Time to Live and the Time to Die (1985)
  3. Dust in the Wind (1986)
- Commando
  1. Commando: A One Man Army (2013)
  2. Commando 2: The Black Money Trail (2017)
  3. Commando 3 (2019)
- Conan the Barbarian
  1. Conan the Barbarian (1982)
  2. Conan the Destroyer (1984)
  3. Conan the Barbarian (2011) (reboot)
- Count Bobby
  1. The Adventures of Count Bobby (1961)
  2. The Sweet Life of Count Bobby (1962)
  3. Count Bobby, The Terror of The Wild West (1965)
- The Count of Monte Cristo
  1. The Count of Monte Cristo (1934)
  2. The Son of Monte Cristo (1940)
  3. The Return of Monte Cristo (1946)
- Crackerjack
  1. Crackerjack (1994) (V)
  2. Crackerjack 2 (1996) (V)
  3. Crackerjack 3 (2000) (V)
- Creature
  1. Creature from the Black Lagoon (1954)
  2. Revenge of the Creature (1955)
  3. The Creature Walks Among Us (1956)
- Creepshow
  1. Creepshow (1982)
  2. Creepshow 2 (1987)
  3. Creepshow 3 (2006) (V)
- Crocodile Dundee
  1. Crocodile Dundee (1986)
  2. Crocodile Dundee II (1988)
  3. Crocodile Dundee in Los Angeles (2001)
- Crows
  1. Crows Zero (2007)
  2. Crows Zero 2 (2009)
  3. Crows Explode (2014)
- Cruel Intentions
  1. Cruel Intentions (1999)
  2. Cruel Intentions 2 (2000) (V) (prequel)
  3. Cruel Intentions 3 (2004) (V)
- Cyborg
  1. Cyborg (1989)
  2. Cyborg 2 (1993) (V)
  3. Cyborg 3: The Recycler (1994) (V)
- Cyborg Cop
  1. Cyborg Cop (1993) (V)
  2. Cyborg Cop II (1994) (V)
  3. Cyborg Cop III (1995) (V)

== D ==
- Dabangg
  1. Dabangg (2010)
  2. Dabangg 2 (2012)
  3. Dabangg 3 (2019)
- Deep Blue Sea
  1. Deep Blue Sea (1999)
  2. Deep Blue Sea 2 (2018) (V)
  3. Deep Blue Sea 3 (2020) (V)
- Daddy Day Care
  1. Daddy Day Care (2003)
  2. Daddy Day Camp (2007)
  3. Grand-Daddy Day Care (2019) (V)
- Daimajin
  1. Daimajin (1966)
  2. Wrath of Daimajin (1966)
  3. Return of Daimajin (1966)
- Dallas **
  1. Dallas: The Early Years (1986) (TV)
  2. Dallas: J.R. Returns (1996) (TV)
  3. Dallas: War of the Ewings (1998) (TV)
- Dancing Master
  1. Dancing Master (1979)
  2. Superhand: Shadow of the Dancing Master (1980)
  3. Dancing Master 2: Macao Connection (1982)
- Dandupalya
  1. Dandupalya (2012)
  2. Dandupalya 2 (2017)
  3. Dandupalya 3 (2018)
- Darkman
  1. Darkman (1990)
  2. Darkman II: The Return of Durant (1995) (V)
  3. Darkman III: Die Darkman Die (1996) (V)
- Darling Caroline
  1. Darling Caroline (1951)
  2. A Caprice of Darling Caroline (1953)
  3. Caroline and the Rebels (1955)
- Darrow & Darrow
  1. Darrow & Darrow (2017) (TV)
  2. In the Key of Murder (2018) (TV)
  3. Body of Evidence (2018) (TV)
- Dasan and Vijayan
  1. Nadodikkattu (1987)
  2. Pattanapravesham (1988)
  3. Akkareyakkareyakkare (1990)
- Days of Being Wild
  1. Days of Being Wild (1991)
  2. In the Mood for Love (2000)
  3. 2046 (2004)
- Dead or Alive
  1. Dead or Alive: Hanzaisha (1999)
  2. Dead or Alive 2: Tôbôsha (2000)
  3. Dead or Alive: Final (2002)
- Dear Ruth
  1. Dear Ruth (1947)
  2. Dear Wife (1949)
  3. Dear Brat (1951)
- Death Note
  1. Death Note (2006)
  2. Death Note: The Last Name (2007)
  3. L Change the WorLd (2008)
- Gus Van Sant's Death Trilogy
  1. Gerry (2002)
  2. Elephant (2003)
  3. Last Days (2005)
- The Decline of Western Civilization
  1. The Decline of Western Civilization (1981)
  2. The Decline of Western Civilization Part II: The Metal Years (1988)
  3. The Decline of Western Civilization III (1998)
- The Defenders **
  1. The Defenders: Payback (1997) (TV)
  2. The Defenders: Choice of Evils (1998) (TV)
  3. The Defenders: Taking the First (1998) (TV)
- The Delta Force
  1. The Delta Force (1986)
  2. Delta Force 2: The Colombian Connection (1990)
  3. Delta Force 3: The Killing Game (1991) (V)
- Demons
  1. Dèmoni (1985) (aka Demons)
  2. Dèmoni 2 (1986) (aka Demons 2)
  3. Dèmoni 3 (1991) (aka Demons 3, Black Demons, The Church)
- Luca Guadagnino's Desire Trilogy
  1. I Am Love (2009)
  2. A Bigger Splash (2015)
  3. Call Me by Your Name (2017)
- Detective Dee
  1. Detective Dee and the Mystery of the Phantom Flame (2010)
  2. Young Detective Dee: Rise of the Sea Dragon (2013) (prequel)
  3. Detective Dee: The Four Heavenly Kings (2018) (prequel)
- Deuxième Bureau
  1. Alerte au Deuxième Bureau (1956)
  2. Deuxième Bureau contre inconnu (1957)
  3. Rapt au Deuxième Bureau (1958)
- Dhoom
  1. Dhoom (2004)
  2. Dhoom 2 (2006)
  3. Dhoom 3 (2013)
- Dibu *
  1. Dibu: La película (1997)
  2. Dibu 2: La venganza de Nasty (1998)
  3. Dibu 3 (2002)
- Dick Barton *
  1. Dick Barton: Special Agent (1948)
  2. Dick Barton Strikes Back (1949)
  3. Dick Barton at Bay (1950)
- Disaster
  1. Your Name (2016) (A)
  2. Weathering with You (2019) (A)
  3. Suzume (2022) (A)
- The Divergent Series
  1. Divergent (2014)
  2. The Divergent Series: Insurgent (2015)
  3. The Divergent Series: Allegiant (2016)
- Fritz Lang's Dr. Mabuse Trilogy
  1. Dr. Mabuse the Gambler (1922)
  2. The Testament of Dr. Mabuse (1933)
  3. The Thousand Eyes of Dr. Mabuse (1960)
- Driller Killer
  1. The Driller Killer (1979)
  2. Driller Killer E2 (2012)
  3. Detroit Driller Killer (2020)
- Doctor Who
  1. The Name of the Doctor (2013) (TV)
  2. The Day of the Doctor (2013) (TV)
  3. The Time of the Doctor (2013) (TV)
- Dollars Trilogy
  1. A Fistful of Dollars (1964)
  2. For a Few Dollars More (1965)
  3. The Good, the Bad and the Ugly (1966) (prequel)
- Whit Stillman's "Doomed-Bourgeois-in-Love" series
  1. Metropolitan (1990)
  2. Barcelona (1994)
  3. The Last Days of Disco (1998)
- Dr. Fu Manchu (Warner Oland series)
  1. The Mysterious Dr. Fu Manchu (1929)
  2. The Return of Dr. Fu Manchu (1930)
  3. Daughter of the Dragon (1931)
- Dr. Goldfoot and Franco and Ciccio
  1. Dr. Goldfoot and the Bikini Machine (1965)
  2. Two Mafiosi Against Goldginger (1965)
  3. Dr. Goldfoot and the Girl Bombs (1966)
- Dr. John Luke and the Wyatt Quintuplets
  1. The Country Doctor (1936)
  2. Reunion (1936)
  3. Five of a Kind (1938)
- Dracula 2000
  1. Dracula 2000 (2000)
  2. Dracula II: Ascension (2003) (V)
  3. Dracula III: Legacy (2005) (V)
- Drake & Josh *
  1. Drake & Josh Go Hollywood (2006) (TV)
  2. Drake & Josh: Really Big Shrimp (2007) (TV)
  3. Merry Christmas, Drake & Josh (2008) (TV)
- Duma o Kovpake
  1. Duma o Kovpake: Nabat (1973)
  2. Duma o Kovpake: Buran (1975)
  3. Duma o Kovpake: Karpaty, Karpaty... (1976)
- Dumb and Dumber *
  1. Dumb and Dumber (1994)
  2. Dumb and Dumberer: When Harry Met Lloyd (2003) (prequel)
  3. Dumb and Dumber To (2014) (retcon)
- Dynasty ***
  1. Dynasty: The Reunion (1991) (TV)
  2. Dynasty: The Making of a Guilty Pleasure (2005) (TV)
  3. Dynasty Reunion: Catfights & Caviar (2006) (TV)

== E ==
- The Elements Trilogy
  1. Fire (1996)
  2. Earth (1998)
  3. Water (2005)
- Elvis Gratton *
  1. Elvis Gratton: Le king des kings (1985)
  2. Elvis Gratton II: Miracle à Memphis (1999)
  3. Elvis Gratton 3: Le retour d'Elvis Wong (2004)
- Emil i Lönneberga
  1. Emil i Lönneberga (1971)
  2. Nya hyss av Emil i Lönneberga (1972)
  3. Emil and the Piglet (1973)
- Emma Fielding
  1. Site Unseen (2017) (TV)
  2. Past Malice (2018) (TV)
  3. More Bitter than Death (2019) (TV)
- Enola Holmes
  1. Enola Holmes (2020)
  2. Enola Holmes 2 (2022)
  3. Enola Holmes 3 (2026)
- Entrails of a Virgin
  1. Entrails of a Virgin (1986)
  2. Entrails of a Beautiful Woman (1986)
  3. Female Inquisitor (1987)
- The Equalizer **
  1. The Equalizer (2014)
  2. The Equalizer 2 (2018)
  3. The Equalizer 3 (2023)
- Erkan & Stefan
  1. Erkan & Stefan (2000)
  2. Erkan & Stefan gegen die Mächte der Finsternis (2002)
  3. Erkan & Stefan in Der Tod kommt krass (2005)
- Erotic Ghost Story
  1. Erotic Ghost Story (1987)
  2. Erotic Ghost Story II (1993)
  3. Erotic Ghost Story III (1994)
- Escape Plan
  1. Escape Plan (2013)
  2. Escape Plan 2: Hades (2018) (V)
  3. Escape Plan: The Extractors (2019) (V)
- The Europa Trilogy
  1. The Element of Crime (1984)
  2. Epidemic (1988)
  3. Europa (1991)
- The Eye
  1. The Eye (2002)
  2. The Eye 2 (2004)
  3. The Eye 10 (2005)
- Eyyvah Eyvah
  1. Eyyvah Eyvah (2010)
  2. Eyyvah Eyvah 2 (2011)
  3. Eyyvah Eyvah 3 (2014)

== F ==
- Fack ju Göhte (Germany)
  1. Fack ju Göhte (2013)
  2. Fack ju Göhte 2 (2015)
  3. Fack ju Göhte 3 (2017)
- The Fairly OddParents
  1. A Fairly Odd Movie: Grow Up, Timmy Turner! (2011) (TV)
  2. A Fairly Odd Christmas (2012) (TV)
  3. A Fairly Odd Summer (2014) (TV)
- Familien Gyldenkål
  1. Familien Gyldenkål (1975)
  2. Familien Gyldenkål sprænger banken (1976)
  3. Familien Gyldenkål vinder valget (1977)
- Family of Cops
  1. Family of Cops (1995) (TV)
  2. Breach of Faith: A Family of Cops 2 (1997) (TV)
  3. Family of Cops 3 (1999) (TV)
- Fantômas
  1. Fantômas (1964)
  2. Fantômas se déchaîne (1965)
  3. Fantômas contre Scotland Yard (1967)
- Fanny Hill
  1. Fanny Hill Meets Lady Chatterly (1967)
  2. Fanny Hill Meets Dr. Erotico (1967)
  3. Fanny Hill Meets the Red Baron (1968)
- Fast
  1. Fast Company (1938)
  2. Fast and Loose (1939)
  3. Fast and Furious (1939)
- Fatal Fury
  1. Fatal Fury: Legend of the Hungry Wolf (1992) (TV)
  2. Fatal Fury: The Motion Picture (1994)
  3. Fatal Fury 2: The New Battle (1993) (TV)
- Fate/stay night: Heaven's Feel (A)
  1. Fate/stay night: Heaven's Feel I. presage flower (2017)
  2. Fate/stay night: Heaven's Feel II. lost butterfly (2019)
  3. Fate/stay night: Heaven's Feel III. spring song (2020)
- Father Christmas
  1. Finding Father Christmas (2016) (TV)
  2. Engaging Father Christmas (2017) (TV)
  3. Marrying Father Christmas (2018) (TV)
- Feast
  1. Feast (2005) (V)
  2. Feast II: Sloppy Seconds (2008) (V)
  3. Feast III: The Happy Finish (2009) (V)
- Felice Sciosciammocca
  1. Neapolitan Turk (1953)
  2. Poverty and Nobility (1954)
  3. The Doctor of the Mad (1954)
- Fifty Shades
  1. Fifty Shades of Grey (2015)
  2. Fifty Shades Darker (2017)
  3. Fifty Shades Freed (2018)
- Fight Back to School
  1. Fight Back to School (1991)
  2. Fight Back to School II (1992)
  3. Fight Back to School III (1993)
- Firefly
  1. House of 1000 Corpses (2003)
  2. The Devil's Rejects (2005)
  3. 3 from Hell (2019)
- Fixer Upper Mysteries
  1. Framed for Murder: A Fixer Upper Mystery (2017) (TV)
  2. Concrete Evidence: A Fixer Upper Mystery (2017) (TV)
  3. Deadly Deed: A Fixer Upper Mystery (2018) (TV)
- Flåklypa Grand Prix
  1. Flåklypa Grand Prix (1975)
  2. Gurin with the Foxtail (1998)
  3. Solan og Ludvig – Jul i Flåklypa (2013)
- Flash Gordon (serials)
  1. Flash Gordon (1936)
  2. Flash Gordon's Trip to Mars (1938)
  3. Flash Gordon Conquers the Universe (1940)
- Flesh trilogy
  1. The Touch of Her Flesh (1967)
  2. The Kiss of Her Flesh (1968)
  3. The Curse of Her Flesh (1968)
- Flicka
  1. Flicka (2006)
  2. Flicka 2 (2010) (V)
  3. Flicka: Country Pride (2012) (V)
- Flodder *
  1. Flodder (1986)
  2. Flodders in America (1992)
  3. Flodder 3 (1995)
- Flower Shop Mysteries
  1. Mum's the Word: A Flower Shop Mystery (2016) (TV)
  2. Flower Shop Mystery: Snipped in the Bud (2016) (TV)
  3. Flower Shop Mystery: Dearly Depotted (2016) (TV)
- Force of Execution
  1. Force of Execution (2013) (V)
  2. A Good Man (2014) (V) (prequel)
  3. Absolution (2015) (V) (prequel)
- Foster's Home for Imaginary Friends *
  1. House of Bloo's (2004) (TV)
  2. Good Wilt Hunting (2006) (TV)
  3. Destination: Imagination (2008) (TV)
- Fred *
  1. Fred: The Movie (2010) (TV)
  2. Fred 2: Night of the Living Fred (2011) (TV)
  3. Fred 3: Camp Fred (2012) (TV)
- Free! (A)
  1. Free! Timeless Medley: The Bond (2017)
  2. Free! Timeless Medley: The Promise (2017)
  3. Free! Take Your Marks (2017)
- The French Connection
  1. The French Connection (1971)
  2. French Connection II (1975)
  3. Popeye Doyle (1986) (TV)
- Friday
  1. Friday (1995)
  2. Next Friday (2000)
  3. Friday After Next (2002)
- Friendship trilogy
  1. Dil Chahta Hai (2001)
  2. Rock On!! (2008)
  3. Zindagi Na Milegi Dobara (2010)
- From Dusk till Dawn *
  1. From Dusk till Dawn (1996)
  2. From Dusk till Dawn 2: Texas Blood Money (1999)
  3. From Dusk till Dawn 3: The Hangman's Daughter (2000) (prequel)
- Frozen (A)
  1. Frozen (2013)
  2. Frozen 2 (2019)
  3. Frozen 3 (2027)
- Furyô banchô: Inoshika Ochô
  1. Furyô banchô: Inoshika Ochô (1969)
  2. Furyô anego den: Inoshika Ochô (1973)
  3. Yasagure anego den: sôkatsu rinchi (1973)

== G ==
- Gas House Kids
  1. Gas House Kids (1946)
  2. Gas House Kids Go West (1947)
  3. Gas House Kids in Hollywood (1947)
- General's Son
  1. General's Son (1990)
  2. General's Son II (1991)
  3. General's Son III (1992)
- Georges Masse
  1. Mission à Tanger (1949)
  2. Méfiez-vous des blondes (1950)
  3. Massacre en dentelles (1952)
- The German Trilogy (Luchino Visconti)
  1. The Damned (1969)
  2. Death in Venice (1971)
  3. Ludwig (1972)
- Get Married
  1. Get Married (2007)
  2. Get Married 2 (2009)
  3. Get Married 3 (2011)
- Gilligan's Island ***
  1. Rescue from Gilligan's Island (1978) (TV)
  2. The Castaways on Gilligan's Island (1979) (TV)
  3. The Harlem Globetrotters on Gilligan's Island (1981) (TV)
- Ginger
  1. Ginger (1971)
  2. The Abductors (1972)
  3. Girls Are for Loving (1973)
- Ginger Snaps
  1. Ginger Snaps (2000)
  2. Ginger Snaps 2: Unleashed (2004)
  3. Ginger Snaps Back: The Beginning (2004) (prequel)
- Goal!
  1. Goal (2005)
  2. Goal II: Living the Dream (2007)
  3. Goal III: Taking on the World (2009) (V)
- The Godfather
  1. The Godfather (1972)
  2. The Godfather Part II (1974)
  3. The Godfather Part III (1990)
- Golden Chicken
  1. Golden Chicken (2002)
  2. Golden Chicken 2 (2003)
  3. Golden Chicken 3 (2014)
- A Golden Christmas
  1. A Golden Christmas (2009) (TV)
  2. A Golden Christmas 2: The Second Tail (2011) (V)
  3. A Golden Christmas 3 (2012) (V)
- Lars von Trier's Golden Heart trilogy
  1. Breaking the Waves (1996)
  2. The Idiots (1998)
  3. Dancer in the Dark (2000)
- Goldy
  1. Goldy: The Last of the Golden Bears (1984)
  2. Goldy 2: The Saga of the Golden Bear (1986)
  3. The Magic of the Golden Bear: Goldy III (1994)
- Goodnight for Justice
  1. Goodnight for Justice (2011) (TV)
  2. The Measure of a Man (2012) (TV)
  3. Queen of Hearts (2013) (TV)
- Goopy Gyne Bagha Byne
  1. Goopy Gyne Bagha Byne (1968)
  2. Heerak Rajar Deshe (1980)
  3. Goopy Bagha Phire Elo (1991)
- G.O.R.A.
  1. G.O.R.A. (2004)
  2. A.R.O.G. (2008)
  3. Arif V 216 (2018)
- Le Gorille *
  1. Le Gorille vous salue bien (1958)
  2. La Valse du Gorille (1959)
  3. Le Gorille a mordu l'archevêque (1963)
- Göta kanal
  1. Göta kanal eller Vem drog ur proppen? (1981)
  2. Göta kanal 2 - Kanalkampen (2006)
  3. Göta kanal 3 - Kanalkungens hemlighet (2009)
- Graceland
  1. Christmas at Graceland (2018) (TV)
  2. Wedding at Graceland (2019) (TV)
  3. Christmas at Graceland: Home for the Holidays (2019) (TV)
- Green Street (Hooligans)
  1. Green Street (2005)
  2. Green Street 2: Stand Your Ground (2009)
  3. Green Street 3: Never Back Down (2013)
- Gremlins
  1. Gremlins (1984)
  2. Gremlins 2: The New Batch (1990)
  3. Gremlins 3 (2027)
- The Grim Adventures of Billy & Mandy **
  1. Billy & Mandy's Big Boogey Adventure (2007) (TV)
  2. Billy & Mandy: Wrath of the Spider Queen (2007) (TV)
  3. Underfist: Halloween Bash (2008) (TV)
- Guardians of the Galaxy
  1. Guardians of the Galaxy (2014)
  2. Guardians of the Galaxy Vol. 2 (2017)
  3. Guardians of the Galaxy Vol. 3 (2023)
- Guns of El Chupacabra
  1. Guns of El Chupacabra (1997) (V)
  2. Guns of El Chupacabra II: The Unseen (1998) (V)
  3. El Chupacabra (2003) (V)

== H ==
- Ha-Chayim Al-Pi Agfa
  1. Ha-Chayim Al-Pi Agfa (1992)
  2. Smicha Hashmalit Ushma Moshe (1995)
  3. Mar Baum (1997)
- Hal Roach's Streamliners-Western trilogy
  1. Dudes Are Pretty People (1942)
  2. Calaboose (1943)
  3. Prairie Chickens (1943)
- Hanzo 'The Razor' Itami (aka Goyôkiba)
  1. Goyôkiba (1972)
  2. Goyôkiba: Kamisori Hanzô jigoku zeme (1973)
  3. Goyôkiba: Oni no Hanzô yawahada koban (1974)
- The Hangover
  1. The Hangover (2009)
  2. The Hangover Part II (2011)
  3. The Hangover Part III (2013)
- The Happy Hooker
  1. The Happy Hooker (1975)
  2. The Happy Hooker Goes to Washington (1977)
  3. The Happy Hooker Goes Hollywood (1980)
- Hard Time
  1. Hard Time (1998) (TV)
  2. The Premonition (1999) (TV)
  3. Hostage Hotel (1999) (TV)
- Harihar Nagar
  1. In Harihar Nagar (1990)
  2. 2 Harihar Nagar (2009)
  3. In Ghost House Inn (2010)
- Harlem Detective series
  1. Cotton Comes to Harlem (1970)
  2. Come Back, Charleston Blue (1972)
  3. A Rage in Harlem (1991)
- Harold & Kumar
  1. Harold & Kumar Go to White Castle (2004)
  2. Harold & Kumar Escape from Guantanamo Bay (2008)
  3. A Very Harold & Kumar 3D Christmas (2011)
- Has Fallen
  1. Olympus Has Fallen (2013)
  2. London Has Fallen (2016)
  3. Angel Has Fallen (2019)
- The Haunted House * (A)
  1. The Haunted House: The Secret of the Cave (2018)
  2. The Haunted House: The Sky Goblin VS Jormungandr (2019)
  3. The Haunted House: The Dimensional Goblin and the Seven Worlds (2022)
- Heintje
  1. Heintje - Ein Herz geht auf Reisen (1969)
  2. Heintje - Einmal wird die Sonne wieder scheinen (1970)
  3. Heintje - Mein bester Freund (1970)
- Hej Stine!
  1. Hej Stine! (1970)
  2. I din fars lomme (1973)
  3. Sådan er jeg osse (1980)
- Helga
  1. Helga – Vom Werden des menschlichen Lebens (1967)
  2. Helga und Michael (1968)
  3. Helga und die Männer - Die sexuelle Revolution (1969)
- Hell House LLC
  1. Hell House LLC (2015)
  2. Hell House LLC 2: The Abaddon Hotel (2018) (TV)
  3. Hell House LLC III: Lake of Fire (2019) (TV)
- The Henrietta
  1. The Lamb (1915)
  2. The Mollycoddle (1920)
  3. The Saphead (1920)
- Her Fatal Ways
  1. Her Fatal Ways (1990)
  2. Her Fatal Ways II (1991)
  3. Her Fatal Ways III (1993)
- Hercule Poirot, portrayed by Kenneth Branagh
  1. Murder on the Orient Express (2017)
  2. Death on the Nile (2022)
  3. A Haunting in Venice (2023)
- Hexen bis aufs Blut gequält
  1. Hexen bis aufs Blut gequält (1970)
  2. Hexen geschändet und zu Tode gequält (1973)
  3. Mark of the Devil 666: The Moralist (1995)
- The Hitcher
  1. The Hitcher (1986)
  2. The Hitcher II: I've Been Waiting (2003) (V)
  3. The Hitcher (2007) (remake)
- Honey, I Shrunk the Kids *
  1. Honey, I Shrunk the Kids (1989)
  2. Honey, I Blew Up the Kid (1992)
  3. Honey, We Shrunk Ourselves (1997) (V)
- Hostel
  1. Hostel (2005)
  2. Hostel: Part II (2007)
  3. Hostel: Part III (2011) (V)
- House of Angels
  1. House of Angels (1992)
  2. House of Angels – The Second Summer (1994)
  3. House of Angels – Third Time Lucky (2010)
- How to Train Your Dragon ** (A)
  1. How to Train Your Dragon (2010)
  2. How to Train Your Dragon 2 (2014)
  3. How to Train Your Dragon: The Hidden World (2019)
- The Human Centipede
  1. The Human Centipede (First Sequence) (2009)
  2. The Human Centipede 2 (Full Sequence) (2011)
  3. The Human Centipede 3 (Final Sequence) (2015)
- The Human Condition
  1. No Greater Love (1959)
  2. Road to Eternity (1959)
  3. A Soldier's Prayer (1961)
- Hustruer
  1. Hustruer (1975)
  2. Hustruer - ti år etter (1985)
  3. Hustruer III (1996)

== I ==
- In the Name of the King
  1. In the Name of the King (2007)
  2. In the Name of the King 2: Two Worlds (2011) (V)
  3. In the Name of the King 3: The Last Mission (2014) (V)
- I Love a Mystery
  1. I Love a Mystery (1945)
  2. The Devil's Mask (1946)
  3. The Unknown (1946)
- I mostri
  1. I mostri (1963)
  2. I nuovi mostri (1977)
  3. I mostri oggi (2009)
- In the Heat of the Night *
  1. In the Heat of the Night (1967)
  2. They Call Me MISTER Tibbs! (1970)
  3. The Organization (1971)
- In Wahrheit
  1. In Wahrheit: Mord am Engelsgraben (2017) (TV)
  2. In Wahrheit: Jette ist tot (2018) (TV)
  3. In Wahrheit: Still ruht der See (2019) (TV)
- Incident
  1. The Incident (1990) (TV)
  2. Against Her Will: An Incident in Baltimore (1992) (TV)
  3. Incident in a Small Town (1994) (TV)
- Indecent Behavior
  1. Indecent Behavior (1993)
  2. Indecent Behavior II (1994)
  3. Indecent Behavior III (1995)
- Infernal Affairs
  1. Infernal Affairs (2002)
  2. Infernal Affairs II (2003) (prequel)
  3. Infernal Affairs III (2003)
- Inspector Balram
  1. Aavanazhi (1986)
  2. Inspector Balram (1991)
  3. Balram vs. Tharadas (2006)
- Inspector Hornleigh
  1. Inspector Hornleigh (1939)
  2. Inspector Hornleigh on Holiday (1939)
  3. Inspector Hornleigh Goes to It (1941)
- Inspecteur Sergil
  1. Inspecteur Sergil (1947)
  2. Sergil et le dictateur (1948)
  3. Sergil chez les filles (1952)
- Inspector Bo Jarnebring **
  1. The Man from Majorca (1984)
  2. I lagens namn (1986)
  3. Den vite riddaren (1994) (TV)
- Cartoon Saloon's Irish Folklore Trilogy
  1. The Secret of Kells (2009)
  2. Song of the Sea (2014)
  3. Wolfwalkers (2020)
- I soliti ignoti
  1. I soliti ignoti (1958)
  2. Audace colpo dei soliti ignoti (1959)
  3. I soliti ignoti vent'anni dopo (1985)
- Renato Castellani's Italian neorealism trilogy
  1. Under the Sun of Rome (aka Sotto il sole di Roma) (1948)
  2. È primavera... (1950)
  3. Two Cents Worth of Hope (aka Due Soldi di Speranza) (1950)
- It's Alive
  1. It's Alive (1974)
  2. It Lives Again (1978)
  3. It's Alive III: Island of the Alive (1987)
- Ivan Tsarevich and the Gray Wolf (A)
  1. Ivan Tsarevich and the Gray Wolf (2011)
  2. Ivan Tsarevich and the Gray Wolf (2013)
  3. Ivan Tsarevich and the Gray Wolf (2016)

== J ==
- Jeff Gordon
  1. Des frissons partout (1963)
  2. Laissez tirer les tireurs (1964)
  3. Ces dames s'en mêlent (1965)
- Jeg - en kvinde
  1. Jeg - en kvinde (1965)
  2. Jeg, en kvinda II (1968)
  3. 3 slags kærlighed (1970)
- Je hais...
  1. Je hais les enfants (2003) (TV)
  2. Je hais les parents (2005) (TV)
  3. Je hais les vacances (2006) (TV)
- Jesse James (Republic serials)
  1. Jesse James Rides Again (1947)
  2. Adventures of Frank and Jesse James (1948)
  3. The James Brothers of Missouri (1949)
- Jiang tou
  1. Jiang tou (1975)
  2. Gou hun jiang tou (1976)
  3. Ratu ilmu hitam (1979)
- The Jimmy Timmy Power Hour
  1. The Jimmy Timmy Power Hour (2004) (TV)
  2. The Jimmy Timmy Power Hour 2: When Nerds Collide (2006) (TV)
  3. The Jimmy Timmy Power Hour 3: The Jerkinators (2006) (TV)
- João de Deus
  1. Recordações da Casa Amarela (1989)
  2. A Comédia de Deus (1995)
  3. As Bodas de Deus (1999)
- Joe Lampton *
  1. Room at the Top (1959)
  2. Life at the Top (1965)
  3. Man at the Top (1973)
- John Woo's Once a Thief
  1. Once a Thief (1996) (TV)
  2. Once a Thief: Brother Against Brother (1997) (TV)
  3. Once a Thief: Family Business (1998) (TV)
- Johnny English
  1. Johnny English (2003)
  2. Johnny English Reborn (2011)
  3. Johnny English Strikes Again (2018)
- Jonny Quest **
  1. Jonny's Golden Quest (1993) (TV)
  2. Jonny Quest vs. The Cyber Insects (1995) (TV)
  3. Tom and Jerry: Spy Quest (2015) (V)*

* Crossover with Tom and Jerry.

- Joy Ride
  1. Joy Ride (2001)
  2. Joy Ride 2: Dead Ahead (2008) (V)
  3. Joy Ride 3: Roadkill (2014) (V)
- Jungledyret * (A)
  1. Jungledyret (1993)
  2. Jungledyret 2 - den store filmhelt (1996)
  3. Jungledyret Hugo: Fræk, flabet og fri (2007)
- El Jinete solitario
  1. El Jinete solitario (1958)
  2. El jinete solitario en el valle de los buitres (1958)
  3. El Jinete solitario en el valle de los desaparecidos (1960)

== K ==
- Kaiji
  1. Kaiji (2009)
  2. Kaiji 2 (2011)
  3. Kaiji: Final Game (2020)
- Kakababu
  1. Mishawr Rawhoshyo (2013)
  2. Yeti Obhijaan (2017)
  3. Kakababur Protyaborton (2019)
- The Karnstein Trilogy
  1. The Vampire Lovers (1970)
  2. Lust for a Vampire (1971)
  3. Twins of Evil (1972)
- Kasargod Khader Bhai
  1. Mimics Parade (1991)
  2. Kasargod Khader Bhai (1992)
  3. Again Kasargod Khader Bhai (2010)
- Kate Kirby
  1. Chelsea 7750 (1913)
  2. An Hour Before Dawn (1913)
  3. The Port of Doom (1913)
- Kekec
  1. Kekec (1951)
  2. Srecno Kekec (1963)
  3. Kekceve ukane (1968)
- Ken Masters
  1. Strawberry Roan (1933)
  2. Smoking Guns (1934)
  3. Western Frontier (1935)
- The Kent Family Chronicles (a. k. a. The Bicentennial Series)
  1. The Bastard (1978) (TV)
  2. The Rebels (1979) (TV)
  3. The Seekers (1979) (TV)
- Kerberos Saga - Kerberos arc (a)
  1. The Red Spectacles (1987)
  2. StrayDog: Kerberos Panzer Cops (1991)
  3. Jin-Roh: The Wolf Brigade (1999)
- Kerubin
  1. Kerubin (1952)
  2. Tulisang Pugot (1953)
  3. Nagkita si Kerubin at si Tulisang Pugot (1954)
- Kevade
  1. Kevade (1969)
  2. Suvi (1976)
  3. Sügis (1990)
- KiDULTHOOD
  1. KiDULTHOOD (2006)
  2. AdULTHOOD (2008)
  3. Brotherhood (2016)
- Kirikou (A) *
  1. Kirikou and the Sorceress (1998)
  2. Kirikou and the Wild Beasts (2005)
  3. Kirikou and the Men and Women (2012)
- The Kissing Booth
  1. The Kissing Booth (2018)
  2. The Kissing Booth 2 (2020)
  3. The Kissing Booth 3 (2021)
- Knight Trilogy
  1. Ivanhoe (1952)
  2. Knights of the Round Table (1953)
  3. The Adventures of Quentin Durward (1955)
- Knight Rider ***
  1. Knight Rider 2000 (1991) (TV)
  2. Knight Rider 2010 (1994) (TV)
  3. Knight Rider (2008) (TV) (reboot)
- Knives Out
  1. Knives Out (2019)
  2. Glass Onion (2022)
  3. Wake Up Dead Man (2025)
- The Koker Trilogy
  1. Where Is the Friend's Home? (1987)
  2. And Life Goes On (aka Life and Nothing More) (1992)
  3. Through the Olive Trees (1994)
- Kolpaçino
  1. Kolpaçino (2009)
  2. Kolpaçino: Bomba (2011)
  3. Kolpaçino 3. Devre (2016)
- Kotigobba
  1. Kotigobba (2001)
  2. Kotigobba 2 (2016)
  3. Kotigobba 3 (2019)
- Koi... Mil Gaya/Krrish
  1. Koi... Mil Gaya (2003)
  2. Krrish (2006)
  3. Krrish 3 (2013)
- Kung Fu **
  1. Kung Fu: The Way of the Tiger, the Sign of the Dragon (1972) (TV)
  2. Kung Fu: The Movie (1986) (TV)
  3. Kung Fu: The Next Generation (1987) (TV)
- Kutsal Damacana
  1. Kutsal Damacana (2007)
  2. Kutsal Damacana 2: İtmen (2010)
  3. Kutsal Damacana: Dracoola (2011)
- Kyaa Kool Hai Hum
  1. Kyaa Kool Hai Hum (2005)
  2. Kyaa Super Kool Hain Hum (2012)
  3. Kyaa Kool Hain Hum 3 (2016)

== L ==
- Lanester (film series)
  1. Lanester (2013) (TV)
  2. Lanester: Memento Mori (2016) (TV)
  3. Lanester: The Children of the Last Rain (2017) (TV)
- The Last Chance Detectives
  1. The Last Chance Detectives: Mystery Lights of Navajo Mesa (1994) (TV)
  2. The Last Chance Detectives: Legend of the Desert Bigfoot (1995) (TV)
  3. The Last Chance Detectives: Escape from Fire Lake (1996) (TV)
- The Last Warrior
  1. The Last Warrior (2017)
  2. The Last Warrior: Root of Evil (2021)
  3. The Last Warrior: A Messenger of Darkness (2021)
- Left Behind
  1. Left Behind (2000) (V)
  2. Left Behind II: Tribulation Force (2002) (V)
  3. Left Behind: World at War (2005)
- Legally Blonde
  1. Legally Blonde (2001)
  2. Legally Blonde 2: Red, White & Blonde (2003)
  3. Legally Blondes (2009) (V) (spin-off)
- The Librarian *
  1. The Librarian: Quest for the Spear (2004) (TV)
  2. The Librarian: Return to King Solomon's Mines (2006) (TV)
  3. The Librarian: Curse of the Judas Chalice (2008) (TV)
- Lilly the Witch
  1. Lilly the Witch: The Dragon and the Magic Book (2009)
  2. Lilly the Witch: The Journey to Mandolan (2011)
  3. Lilly's Bewitched Christmas (2017)
- L'insegnante
  1. L'insegnante (1975)
  2. L'insegnante va in collegio (1978)
  3. L'insegnante viene a casa (1978)
- Disney's The Little Mermaid * (A)
  1. The Little Mermaid (1989)
    A live-action remake of the first film, was released in 2023.
  2. The Little Mermaid II: Return to the Sea (2000)
  3. The Little Mermaid: Ariel's Beginning (2008)
- The Lone Wolf
  1. The Lone Wolf (1952)
  2. The Justice of the Wolf (1952)
  3. The Wolf Returns (1952)
- Look Who's Talking
  1. Look Who's Talking (1989)
  2. Look Who's Talking Too (1990)
  3. Look Who's Talking Now (1993)
- The Lost Boys
  1. The Lost Boys (1987)
  2. Lost Boys: The Tribe (2008) (V)
  3. Lost Boys: The Thirst (2010) (V)
- Lost Bullet
  1. Lost Bullet (2020)
  2. Lost Bullet 2 (2022)
  3. Last Bullet (2025)
- The Lost Treasure of the Knights Templar
  1. The Lost Treasure of the Knights Templar (2006)
  2. The Lost Treasure of the Knights Templar II (2007)
  3. The Lost Treasure of the Knights Templar III: The Mystery of the Snake Crown (2008)
- Love Hunter
  1. Love Hunter (1972)
  2. Love Hunter: Hot Skin (1972)
  3. Love Hunter: Lust (1973)
- Lucky Stars (Primary Trilogy)
  1. Winners and Sinners (1983)
  2. My Lucky Stars (1985)
  3. Twinkle, Twinkle Lucky Stars (1986)
- Lucky Stars (Secondary Trilogy)
  1. Lucky Stars Go Places (1986)
  2. Return of the Lucky Stars (1989)
  3. Ghost Punting (1991)
- Lyubit po-russki
  1. Lyubit po-russki (1989)
  2. Lyubit po-russki 2 (1996)
  3. Lyubit po-russki 3: Gubernator (1999)

== M ==
- Major League
  1. Major League (1989)
  2. Major League II (1994)
  3. Major League: Back to the Minors (1998)
- Malevolence
  1. Malevolence (2004)
  2. Bereavement (2010) (prequel)
  3. Malevolence 3: Killer (2018)
- A Man and a Woman
  1. A Man and a Woman (1966)
  2. A Man and a Woman: 20 Years Later (1986)
  3. Les plus belles années d'une vie (2019)
- A Man Called Horse
  1. A Man Called Horse (1970)
  2. The Return of a Man Called Horse (1976)
  3. Triumphs of a Man Called Horse (1982)
- The Mangler
  1. The Mangler (1995)
  2. The Mangler 2 (2002) (V)
  3. The Mangler Reborn (2005) (V)
- Maniac Cop
  1. Maniac Cop (1988)
  2. Maniac Cop 2 (1990) (V)
  3. Maniac Cop III: Badge of Silence (1993) (V)
- Margret Becker
  1. Children of the Bride (1990) (TV)
  2. Baby of the Bride (1991) (TV)
  3. Mother of the Bride (1993) (TV)
- Mark Trilogy
  1. Mark of the Cop (1975)
  2. Mark Shoots First (1975)
  3. Mark Strikes Again (1976)
- Marrying the Mafia
  1. Marrying the Mafia (2002)
  2. Marrying the Mafia II (2005)
  3. Marrying the Mafia III (2006)
- The Marseille Trilogy
  1. Marius (1931)
  2. Fanny (1932)
  3. César (1936)
- Martial Law
  1. Martial Law (1990) (V)
  2. Martial Law 2: Undercover (1991) (V)
  3. Mission of Justice (1992) (V)
- The Mary Tyler Moore Show *
  1. Mary Tyler Moore: The 20th Anniversary Show (1991) (TV)
  2. Mary and Rhoda (2000) (TV)
  3. The Mary Tyler Moore Reunion (2002) (TV)
- The Masked Gang
  1. The Masked Gang (2005)
  2. The Masked Gang: Iraq (2007)
  3. The Masked Gang: Cyprus (2008)
- Max the Angel
  1. A Town Without Christmas (2001) (TV)
  2. Finding John Christmas (2003) (TV)
  3. When Angels Come to Town (2004) (TV)
- The Maxim Trilogy
  1. The Youth of Maxim (1935)
  2. The Return of Maxim (1937)
  3. The Vyborg Side (1939)
- Maze Runner
  1. The Maze Runner (2014)
  2. Maze Runner: The Scorch Trials (2015)
  3. Maze Runner: The Death Cure (2018)
- The Mechanic
  1. The Mechanic (1972)
  2. The Mechanic (2011) (remake)
  3. Mechanic: Resurrection (2016) (remake)
- Meet the Parents
  1. Meet the Parents (2000)
  2. Meet the Fockers (2004)
  3. Little Fockers (2010)
- Men and War Trilogy
  1. Men and War (1970)
  2. Men and War II (1971)
  3. Men and War III (1973)
- Mercenary Trilogy
  1. The Mercenary (1968)
  2. Compañeros (1970)
  3. Long Live Your Death (1971)
- Mexico Trilogy *
  1. El Mariachi (1992)
  2. Desperado (1995)
  3. Once Upon a Time In Mexico (2003)
- Michael Haneke's Glaciation Trilogy
  1. The Seventh Continent (1989)
  2. Benny's Video (1992)
  3. 71 Fragments of a Chronology of Chance (1994)
- Mick Travis trilogy
  1. If.... (1968)
  2. O Lucky Man! (1973)
  3. Britannia Hospital (1982)
- The Mighty Ducks **
  1. The Mighty Ducks (1992)
  2. D2: The Mighty Ducks (1994)
  3. D3: The Mighty Ducks (1996)
- The Migration Trilogy
  1. The Illegal Immigrant (1985)
  2. An Autumn's Tale (1987)
  3. Eight Taels of Gold (1989)
- Mike Graham (Alistair MacLean's UNACO)
  1. The Hostage Tower (1980) (TV)
  2. Death Train (aka Detonator) (1993) (TV)
  3. Night Watch (1995) (TV)
- Millennium (film series)
  1. The Girl with the Dragon Tattoo (2009)
  2. The Girl Who Played with Fire (2009)
  3. The Girl Who Kicked the Hornets' Nest (2009)
- Mimic
  1. Mimic (1997)
  2. Mimic 2 (2001) (V)
  3. Mimic 3: Sentinel (2003) (V)
- Missing in Action
  1. Missing in Action (1984)
  2. Missing in Action 2: The Beginning (1985) (prequel)
  3. Braddock: Missing in Action III (1988)
- Mobile Suit Gundam Film Series
  1. Mobile Suit Gundam (1981)
  2. Mobile Suit Gundam II: Soldiers of Sorrow (1981)
  3. Mobile Suit Gundam III: Encounters in Space (1982)
- Mobile Suit Zeta Gundam: A New Translation
  1. Mobile Suit Zeta Gundam: A New Translation - Heir to the Stars (2004)
  2. Mobile Suit Zeta Gundam II: A New Translation - Lovers (2005)
  3. Mobile Suit Zeta Gundam III: A New Translation - Love is the Pulse of the Stars (2006)
- A Moment of Romance
  1. A Moment of Romance (1990)
  2. A Moment of Romance II (1992)
  3. A Moment of Romance III (1996)
- Money
  1. Money (1993)
  2. Money Money (1995)
  3. Money Money, More Money (2011)
- The Monkey King
  1. The Monkey King (2014)
  2. The Monkey King 2 (2016)
  3. The Monkey King 3 (2018)
- Mostly Ghostly
  1. Mostly Ghostly (2008) (V)
  2. Mostly Ghostly: Have You Met My Ghoulfriend? (2014) (V)
  3. Mostly Ghostly: One Night in Doom House (2016) (V)
- The Mouse and the Motorcycle
  1. The Mouse and the Motorcycle (1986) (TV)
  2. Runaway Ralph (1988) (TV)
  3. Ralph S. Mouse (1990) (TV)
- Mr. Belvedere *
  1. Sitting Pretty (1948)
  2. Mr. Belvedere Goes to College (1949)
  3. Mr. Belvedere Rings the Bell (1951)
- Mr. Bones
  1. Mr. Bones (2001)
  2. Mr. Bones 2: Back from the Past (2008)
  3. Mr. Bones 3: Son of Bones (2022)
- Mr. District Attorney
  1. Mr. District Attorney (1941)
  2. Mr. District Attorney in the Carter Case (1941)
  3. Secrets of the Underground (1942)
- Murder
  1. Murder (2004)
  2. Murder 2 (2011)
  3. Murder 3 (2013)
- MVP
  1. MVP: Most Valuable Primate (2000)
  2. MVP 2: Most Vertical Primate (2001)
  3. MXP: Most Xtreme Primate (2003)
- My Big Fat Greek Wedding *
  1. My Big Fat Greek Wedding (2002)
  2. My Big Fat Greek Wedding 2 (2016)
  3. My Big Fat Greek Wedding 3 (2023)
- My Friend Flicka *
  1. My Friend Flicka (1943)
  2. Thunderhead, Son of Flicka (1945)
  3. Green Grass of Wyoming (1948)
- My Friends Tigger & Pooh *
  1. Super Sleuth Christmas Movie (2007) (V)
  2. Tigger & Pooh and a Musical Too (2009) (V)
  3. My Friends Tigger & Pooh: Super Duper Super Sleuths (2010) (V)
- My Super Psycho Sweet 16
  1. My Super Psycho Sweet 16 (2009) (TV)
  2. My Super Psycho Sweet 16: Part 2 (2010) (TV)
  3. My Super Psycho Sweet 16: Part 3 (2012) (TV)
- My Wife Is a Gangster
  1. My Wife Is a Gangster (2001)
  2. My Wife Is a Gangster 2 (2003)
  3. My Wife Is a Gangster 3 (2006)

== N ==
- Napló gyermekeimnek
  1. Napló gyermekeimnek (1984)
  2. Napló szerelmeimnek (1987)
  3. Napló apámnak, anyámnak (1990)
- National Lampoon's Dorm Daze
  1. National Lampoon Presents Dorm Daze (2002)
  2. National Lampoon's Dorm Daze 2 (2006) (V)
  3. Transylmania (2009)
- Nemuri Kyoshirō (Kōji Tsuruta series)
  1. Nemuri Kyôshirô Burai Hikae (1956)
  2. Nemuri Kyôshirô Burai Hikae Dainibu (1957)
  3. Nemuri Kyôshirô Burai Hikae: Maken Jigoku (1958)
- The NeverEnding Story **
  1. The NeverEnding Story (1984)
  2. The NeverEnding Story II: The Next Chapter (1990)
  3. The NeverEnding Story III (1994)
- New Initial D the Movie
  1. New Initial D the Movie: Legend 1 - Awakening (2014)
  2. New Initial D the Movie: Legend 2 - Racer (2015)
  3. New Initial D the Movie: Legend 3 - Dream (2016)
- New Mr. Vampire
  1. New Mr. Vampire (1987)
  2. New Mr. Vampire 2 (1990)
  3. New Mr. Vampire 3 (1991)
- Nick Carter (1939 series)
  1. Nick Carter, Master Detective (1939)
  2. Phantom Raiders (1940)
  3. Sky Murder (1940)
- Nikka Zaildar
  1. Nikka Zaildar (2016)
  2. Nikka Zaildar 2 (2017)
  3. Nikka Zaildar 3 (2019)
- Ninja Missions
  1. The Ninja Mission (1984)
  2. Eagle Island (1986)
  3. Russian Terminator (1989)
- The Ninja Trilogy
  1. Enter the Ninja (1981)
  2. Revenge of the Ninja (1983)
  3. Ninja III: The Domination (1984)
- No Retreat, No Surrender
  1. No Retreat, No Surrender (1986)
  2. No Retreat, No Surrender 2 (1989) (V)
  3. No Retreat, No Surrender 3: Blood Brothers (1992) (V)
- Noriko
  1. Late Spring (1949)
  2. Early Summer (1951)
  3. Tokyo Story (1953)
- Not Stupid
  1. I Not Stupid (2002)*
  2. I Not Stupid Too (2006)*
  3. We Not Naughty (2012)
- Not Quite Human
  1. Not Quite Human (1987) (TV)
  2. Not Quite Human II (1989) (TV)
  3. Still Not Quite Human (1992) (TV)
- The Note
  1. The Note (2007) (TV)
  2. Taking a Chance on Love (2009) (TV)
  3. Notes from the Heart Healer (2012) (TV)
- Now You See Me
  1. Now You See Me (2013)
  2. Now You See Me 2 (2016)
  3. Now You See Me: Now You Don't (2025)
- Numbskull
  1. O Brother, Where Art Thou? (2000)
  2. Intolerable Cruelty (2003)
  3. Hail, Caesar! (2016)
- Nunsense
  1. Nunsense (1993) (TV)
  2. Nunsense 2: The Sequel (1994) (TV)
  3. Nunsense Jamboree (1998) (TV)

== O ==
- Oh, God!
  1. Oh, God! (1977)
  2. Oh, God! Book II (1980)
  3. Oh, God! You Devil (1984)
- On the Buses *
  1. On the Buses (1971)
  2. Mutiny on the Buses (1971)
  3. Holiday on the Buses (1972)
- Once Upon a Time Trilogy
  1. Once Upon a Time in the West (1968)
  2. Duck, You Sucker! (1971)
  3. Once Upon a Time in America (1984)
- One Missed Call *
  1. One Missed Call (2004)
  2. One Missed Call 2 (2005)
  3. One Missed Call: Final (2006)
- Ong-Bak
  1. Ong-Bak: Muay Thai Warrior (2003)
  2. Ong Bak 2 (2008) (prequel)
  3. Ong Bak 3 (2010) (prequel)
- Outpost
  1. Outpost (2008)
  2. Outpost: Black Sun (2012)
  3. Outpost: Rise of the Spetsnaz (2013) (prequel)
- Open Water
  1. Open Water (2003)
  2. Open Water 2: Adrift (2006)
  3. Open Water 3: Cage Dive (2017)
- Optimistic Trilogy (aka Roman Trilogy)
  1. Poor, But Handsome (1957)
  2. Pretty But Poor (1957)
  3. Poor Millionaires (1959)
- Orgasmo
  1. Orgasmo (1969)
  2. Così dolce... così perversa (1969)
  3. Paranoia (1970)
- The Orphic Trilogy
  1. The Blood of a Poet (1932)
  2. Orphée (1950)
  3. Testament of Orpheus (1960)
- Oslo trilogy
  1. Reprise (2006)
  2. Oslo, August 31st (2011)
  3. The Worst Person in the World (2021)
- Our Crazy Aunts
  1. Unsere tollen Tanten in der Südsee (1961)
  2. Our Crazy Nieces (1963)
  3. Our Crazy Aunts in the South Seas (1964)
- Outrage
  1. Outrage (2010)
  2. Beyond Outrage (2012)
  3. Outrage Coda (2017)

== P ==
- På dessa skuldror
  1. På dessa skuldror (1948)
  2. Människors rike (1949)
  3. Tarps Elin (1956)
- Alejandro González Iñárritu & Guillermo Arriaga's Pain Trilogy
  1. Amores perros (2000)
  2. 21 Grams (2003)
  3. Babel (2006)
- Page 3
  1. Page 3 (2005)
  2. Corporate (2006)
  3. Traffic Signal (2007)
- Palaris
  1. Palaris (1941)
  2. Awit ni palaris (1946)
  3. Anak ni palaris (1955)
- Paradise trilogy
  1. Paradise: Love (2012)
  2. Paradise: Faith (2012)
  3. Paradise: Hope (2013)
- Partners in Crime
  1. Mon petit doigt m'a dit... (2005)
  2. Crime Is Our Business (2008)
  3. Associés contre le crime (film) (2012)
- Patlabor * (A)
  1. Patlabor: The Movie (2001)
  2. Patlabor 2: The Movie (2002)
  3. WXIII: Patlabor the Movie 3 (2003)
- Pee-wee Herman
  1. Pee-wee's Big Adventure (1985)
  2. Big Top Pee-wee (1988)
  3. Pee-wee's Big Holiday (2016)
- Pelle og Proffen
  1. Døden på Oslo S (1990)
  2. Giftige løgner (1992)
  3. De blå ulvene (1993)
- Penitentiary
  1. Penitentiary (1979)
  2. Penitentiary II (1982)
  3. Penitentiary III (1987)
- Pepe el Toro *
  1. Nosotros los Pobres (1948)
  2. Ustedes los ricos (1948)
  3. Pepe el Toro (1953)
- Per
  1. Flugten (1973)
  2. Per (1975)
  3. Blind makker (1976)
- Peter Voss
  1. Peter Voss, Thief of Millions (1958)
  2. Bobby Dodd greift ein (1959)
  3. Peter Voss, Hero of the Day (1959)
- Phoenix *
  1. Phoenix (1978)
  2. Phoenix 2772 (1980)
  3. Phoenix: Karma Chapter (1986)
- Pido Dida
  1. Pido Dida: Sabay Tayo (1990)
  2. Pido Dida 2 (Kasal na) (1991)
  3. Pido Dida 3: May kambal na (1992)
- Piédalu
  1. Piédalu à Paris (1951)
  2. Piédalu fait des miracles (1952)
  3. Piédalu député (1954)
- Pier Paolo Pasolini's Trilogy of Life
  1. The Decameron (1971)
  2. The Canterbury Tales (1972)
  3. Arabian Nights (1974)
- Piger i trøjen
  1. Piger i trøjen (1975)
  2. Piger i trøjen 2 (1976)
  3. Piger til søs (1977)
- Pigs
  1. Pigs (1992)
  2. Pigs 2: The Last Blood (1994)
  3. Pigs (2020)
- Pink Tush Girl
  1. Pink Tush Girl (1978)
  2. Pink Tush Girl: Love Attack (1979)
  3. Pink Tush Girl: Proposal Strategy (1980)
- Pitch Perfect *
  1. Pitch Perfect (2012)
  2. Pitch Perfect 2 (2015)
  3. Pitch Perfect 3 (2017)
- Poeten og Lillemor
  1. Poeten og Lillemor (1959)
  2. Poeten og Lillemor og Lotte (1960)
  3. Poeten og Lillemor i forårshumør (1961)
- Political Trilogy
  1. Roja (1992)
  2. Bombay (1995)
  3. Dil Se.. (1998)
- Popeye **** (a)
  1. Popeye Meets the Man Who Hated Laughter (1972) (TV)
  2. Popeye (1980)
  3. Popeye's Voyage: The Quest for Pappy (2004) (V)
- Porky's
  1. Porky's (1982)
  2. Porky's II: The Next Day (1983)
  3. Porky's Revenge (1985)
- Prehysteria!
  1. Prehysteria! (1993)
  2. Prehysteria! 2 (1994) (V)
  3. Prehysteria! 3 (1995) (V)
- Private Gladiator
  1. Private Gladiator (2001)
  2. Private Gladiator: In the City of Lust (2001)
  3. Private Gladiator: Sexual Conquest (2001)
- Private Lessons
  1. Private Lessons (1981)
  2. Private Lessons II (1993)
  3. Private Lessons: Another Story (1994)
- Problem Child *
  1. Problem Child (1990)
  2. Problem Child 2 (1991)
  3. Problem Child 3: Junior in Love (1995) (TV)
- Proud to be a Sikh
  1. Proud to be a Sikh (2014)
  2. Proud to be a Sikh 2 (2017)
  3. Proud to be a Sikh 3 (2019)
- Psych *
  1. Psych: The Movie (2017) (TV)
  2. Psych 2: Lassie Come Home (2020) (TV)
  3. Psych 3: This Is Gus (2021) (TV)
- Pulse
  1. Pulse (2006)
  2. Pulse 2: Afterlife (2008) (V)
  3. Pulse 3 (2008) (V)
- Pure Country
  1. Pure Country (1992)
  2. Pure Country 2: The Gift (2010)
  3. Pure Country: Pure Heart (2017)
- Puella Magi Madoka Magica: The Movie (A)
  1. Puella Magi Madoka Magica Part 1: Beginnings (2012)
  2. Puella Magi Madoka Magica Part 2: Eternal (2012)
  3. Puella Magi Madoka Magica New Story: Rebellion (2013)

== Q ==
- The Qatsi Trilogy
  1. Koyaanisqatsi (1982)
  2. Powaqqatsi (1988)
  3. Naqoyqatsi (2002)
- Quatermass
  1. The Quatermass Xperiment (1955)
  2. Quatermass 2 (1957)
  3. Quatermass and the Pit (1967)

== R ==
- Rabbit Without Ears
  1. Rabbit Without Ears (2007)
  2. Rabbit Without Ears 2 (2009)
  3. No-Eared Bunny and Two-Eared Chick (2013)
- Race
  1. Race (2008)
  2. Race 2 (2013)
  3. Race 3 (2018)
- The Rat
  1. The Rat (1925)
  2. The Triumph of the Rat (1926)
  3. The Return of the Rat (1929)
- Re-Animator
  1. Re-Animator (1985)
  2. Bride of Re-Animator (1991)
  3. Beyond Re-Animator (2003) (TV)
- The Red Curtain Trilogy
  1. Strictly Ballroom (1992)
  2. William Shakespeare's Romeo + Juliet (1997)
  3. Moulin Rouge! (2001)
- Red Riding Trilogy
  1. Red Riding: In the Year of Our Lord 1974 (2009)
  2. Red Riding: In the Year of Our Lord 1980 (2009)
  3. Red Riding: In the Year of Our Lord 1983 (2009)
- Red Sonja (a)
  1. Red Sonja (1985)
  2. Red Sonja: Queen of Plagues (2016) (A) (V)
  3. Red Sonja (2025) (reboot)
- Restless
  1. Restless (2000)
  2. Me and Morrison (2001)
  3. Addiction (2004)
- Ring of Fire
  1. Ring of Fire (1991)
  2. Ring of Fire II: Blood and Steel (1993)
  3. Ring of Fire 3: Lion Strike (1995)
- Road Movie Trilogy
  1. Alice in the Cities (1974)
  2. The Wrong Move (1975)
  3. Kings of the Road (1976)
- Roadkill
  1. Roadkill (1989)
  2. Highway 61 (1991)
  3. Hard Core Logo (1996)
- Robert Langdon film series *
  1. The Da Vinci Code (2006)
  2. Angels & Demons (2009)
  3. Inferno (2016)
- Robin Hood (Columbia Pictures)
  1. The Bandit of Sherwood Forest (1946)
  2. The Prince of Thieves (1948)
  3. Rogues of Sherwood Forest (1950)
- Robin Hood (Hammer Films) *
  1. The Men of Sherwood Forest (1954)
  2. Sword of Sherwood Forest (1960)
  3. A Challenge for Robin Hood (1967)
- Rock 'n' Roll High School
  1. Rock 'n' Roll High School (1979)
  2. Rock 'n' Roll High School Forever (1991)
  3. Shake, Rattle and Rock! (1994) (TV)
- The Rocky and Bullwinkle Show * (a)
  1. Boris and Natasha: The Movie (1992)
  2. Dudley Do-Right (1999)
  3. The Adventures of Rocky and Bullwinkle (2000)
- Rogue Warfare
  1. Rogue Warfare (2019)
  2. Rogue Warfare 2: The Hunt (2019)
  3. Rogue Warfare 3: Death of a Nation (2019)
- The Roller Blade Seven
  1. The Roller Blade Seven (1991)
  2. The Legend of the Roller Blade Seven (1992)
  3. Return of the Roller Blade Seven (1993)
- Romy and Michele
  1. Romy and Michele's High School Reunion (1997)
  2. Romy and Michele: In the Beginning (2005) (TV) (prequel)
  3. Romy and Michele 2 (2027) (retcon)
- Rugrats * (A) (Theatrical films)
  1. The Rugrats Movie (1998)
  2. Rugrats in Paris: The Movie (2000)
  3. Rugrats Go Wild (2003)
- Rush Hour *
  1. Rush Hour (1998)
  2. Rush Hour 2 (2001)
  3. Rush Hour 3 (2007)

== S ==
- Sabrina the Teenage Witch *
  1. Sabrina the Teenage Witch (1996) (TV)
  2. Sabrina Goes to Rome (1998) (TV)
  3. Sabrina Down Under (1999) (TV)
- Sailor Moon (original TV series) * (A)
  1. Sailor Moon R: The Movie (1993)
  2. Sailor Moon S: The Movie (1994)
  3. Sailor Moon Super S: The Movie (1995)
- Samurai Trilogy (Hiroshi Inagaki)
  1. Samurai I: Musashi Miyamoto (1954)
  2. Samurai II: Duel at Ichijoji Temple (1955)
  3. Samurai III: Duel at Ganryu Island (1956)
- Samurai Trilogy (Yoji Yamada)
  1. The Twilight Samurai (2002)
  2. The Hidden Blade (2004)
  3. Love and Honor (2006)
- The Sandlot
  1. The Sandlot (1993)
  2. The Sandlot 2 (2005) (V)
  3. The Sandlot: Heading Home (2007) (V)
- The Santa Clause *
  1. The Santa Clause (1994)
  2. The Santa Clause 2: The Mrs. Clause (2002)
  3. The Santa Clause 3: The Escape Clause (2006)
- Nurse Sarah Keate
  1. While the Patient Slept (1935)
  2. The Patient in Room 18 (1938)
  3. Mystery House (1938)
- Sarah, Plain and Tall
  1. Sarah, Plain and Tall (1991) (TV)
  2. Skylark (1993) (TV)
  3. Sarah, Plain and Tall: Winter's End (1999) (TV)
- Scarecrow
  1. Scarecrow (2002) (V)
  2. Scarecrow Slayer (2003) (V)
  3. Scarecrow Gone Wild (2004) (V)
- Screwballs
  1. Screwballs (1983)
  2. Screwballs II: Loose Screws (1985)
  3. Screwball Hotel (1988)
- Secret Agent 077
  1. Agent 077: Mission Bloody Mary (1965)
  2. Agent 077: From the Orient with Fury (1965)
  3. Special Mission Lady Chaplin (1966)
- Secret Games
  1. Secret Games (1992) (V)
  2. Secret Games 2: The Escort (1993) (V)
  3. Secret Games 3 (1994) (V)
- The Sentimental Swordsman
  1. The Sentimental Swordsman (1977)
  2. Return of the Sentimental Swordsman (1981)
  3. Perils of the Sentimental Swordsman (1982)
- Sex and Zen
  1. Sex and Zen (1992)
  2. Sex and Zen II (1996)
  3. Sex and Zen III (1998)
- The Shakespeare Trilogy
  1. Maqbool (2003)
  2. Omkara (2006)
  3. Haider (2014)
- Shaolin Temple
  1. Shaolin Temple (1982)
  2. Kids From Shaolin (1983)
  3. Martial Arts of Shaolin (1986)
- Shark Attack
  1. Shark Attack (1999) (TV)
  2. Shark Attack 2 (2001) (V)
  3. Shark Attack 3 (2002) (V)
- Sharktopus
  1. Sharktopus (2010) (TV)
  2. Sharktopus vs. Pteracuda (2014) (TV)
  3. Sharktopus vs. Whalewolf (2015) (TV)
- Shazam!
  1. Shazam! (2019)
  2. Black Adam (2022) (spin-off)
  3. Shazam! Fury of the Gods (2023)
- Sherlock Holmes: The Golden Years (Note: A series of films where the titular character is portrayed by Christopher Lee.)
  1. Sherlock Holmes and the Deadly Necklace (1962)
  2. Sherlock Holmes and the Leading Lady (1991)
  3. Sherlock Holmes and the Incident at Victoria Falls (1992)
- Shiloh
  1. Shiloh (1996)
  2. Shiloh 2: Shiloh Season (1999)
  3. Saving Shiloh (2006)
- The Shurik Trilogy
  1. Operation Y and Shurik's Other Adventures (1965)
  2. Kidnapping, Caucasian Style (1967)
  3. Ivan Vasilievich: Back to the Future (1973)
- Silence of God (aka Trilogy of Faith or Bergman's Faith Trilogy)
  1. Through a Glass Darkly (1961)
  2. Winter Light (1963)
  3. The Silence (1963)
- Silent Hill
  1. Silent Hill (2006)
  2. Silent Hill: Revelation (2012)
  3. Return to Silent Hill (2026)
- Silent Night, Bloody Night
  1. Silent Night, Bloody Night (1972)
  2. Silent Night, Bloody Night 2: Revival (2014)
  3. Silent Night, Bloody Night: The Homecoming (2013)
- Sinbad the Sailor (Schneer-Harryhausen film series)
  1. The 7th Voyage of Sinbad (1958)
  2. The Golden Voyage of Sinbad (1974)
  3. Sinbad and the Eye of the Tiger (1977)
- Sissi
  1. Sissi (1955)
  2. Sissi – The Young Empress (1956)
  3. Sissi – Fateful Years of an Empress (1957)
- Sister Street Fighter
  1. Sister Street Fighter (1974)
  2. Sister Street Fighter: Hanging by a Thread (1974)
  3. The Return of the Sister Street Fighter (1975)
- The Skulls
  1. The Skulls (2000)
  2. The Skulls II (2002) (V)
  3. The Skulls III (2004) (V)
- Skyline
  1. Skyline (2010)
  2. Beyond Skyline (2017)
  3. Skylines (2020)
- Slap Shot
  1. Slap Shot (1977)
  2. Slap Shot 2: Breaking the Ice (2002) (V)
  3. Slap Shot 3: The Junior League (2008) (V)
- Slumber Party Massacre
  1. The Slumber Party Massacre (1982)
  2. Slumber Party Massacre II (1987)
  3. Slumber Party Massacre III (1990)
- Sometimes They Come Back
  1. Sometimes They Come Back (1991) (TV)
  2. Sometimes They Come Back... Again (1996) (V)
  3. Sometimes They Come Back... for More (1998) (V)
- Sophie Lang
  1. The Notorious Sophie Lang (1934)
  2. The Return of Sophie Lang (1936)
  3. Sophie Lang Goes West (1937)
- Sorority House Massacre
  1. Sorority House Massacre (1986)
  2. Sorority House Massacre II (1990)
  3. Sorority House Massacre III: Hard to Die (1990)
- The Spessart Trilogy
  1. The Spessart Inn (1958)
  2. The Haunted Castle (1960)
  3. Glorious Times at the Spessart Inn (1967)
- Stargate **
  1. Stargate (1994)
  2. Stargate: The Ark of Truth (2008) (V)
  3. Stargate: Continuum (2008) (V)
- Starzan
  1. Starzan: Shouting Star of the Jungle (1989)
  2. Starzan II: The Coming of the Star Son (1989)
  3. Starzan III: The Jungle Triangle (1990)
- The Street Fighter
  1. The Street Fighter (1974)
  2. Return of the Street Fighter (1974)
  3. The Street Fighter's Last Revenge (1974)
- Stuart Little * (a)
  1. Stuart Little (1999)
  2. Stuart Little 2 (2002)
  3. Stuart Little 3: Call of the Wild (2005) (V)
- Super Troopers
  1. Super Troopers (2001)
  2. Super Troopers 2 (2018)
  3. Super Troopers 3 (2026)
- Surrogate Valentine Trilogy
  1. Surrogate Valentine (2011)
  2. Daylight Savings (2012)
  3. I Will Make You Mine (2020)
- S.W.A.T. *
  1. S.W.A.T. (2003)
  2. S.W.A.T.: Firefight (2011) (V)
  3. S.W.A.T.: Under Siege (2017) (V)
- The Swordsman
  1. The Swordsman (1990)
  2. Swordsman II (1992)
  3. The East Is Red (1994) (aka Swordsman III)

== T ==
- Tad the Lost Explorer (A)
  1. Tad, The Lost Explorer (2013)
  2. Tad the Lost Explorer and the Secret of King Midas (2017)
  3. Tad the Lost Explorer and the Emerald Tablet (2022)
- Taken *
  1. Taken (2008)
  2. Taken 2 (2012)
  3. Taken 3 (2014)
- Tales from the Crypt *
  1. Demon Knight (1995)
  2. Bordello of Blood (1996)
  3. Ritual (2002) (V)
- Disney's Tarzan * (A)
  1. Tarzan (1999)
  2. Tarzan & Jane (2002) (V)
  3. Tarzan II (2005) (V) (prequel)
- The Teenage Apocalypse Trilogy
  1. Totally F***ed Up (1993)
  2. The Doom Generation (1995)
  3. Nowhere (1997)
- Takken (a) *
  1. Tekken (2009)
  2. Tekken: Blood Vengeance (2011) (A)
  3. Tekken 2: Kazuya's Revenge (2014) (V) (prequel)
- The Ten Gladiators
  1. The Ten Gladiators (1963)
  2. Triumph of the Ten Gladiators (1964)
  3. Spartacus and the Ten Gladiators (1964)
- Terrifier
  1. Terrifier (2016)
  2. Terrifier 2 (2022)
  3. Terrifier 3 (2024)
- Tetsuo
  1. Tetsuo: The Iron Man (1989)
  2. Tetsuo II: Body Hammer (1992)
  3. Tetsuo: The Bullet Man (2010)
- That's Entertainment!
  1. That's Entertainment! (1974)
  2. That's Entertainment, Part II (1975)
  3. That's Entertainment! III (1996)
- The Thing
  1. The Thing from Another World (1951)
  2. The Thing (1982) (remake)
  3. The Thing (2011) (prequel)
- Things
  1. Things (1993)
  2. Things II (1998)
  3. Things 3: Old Things (1998) (V)
- The 36th Chamber of Shaolin (a. k. a. The Master Killer series)
  1. The 36th Chamber of Shaolin (1978)
  2. Return to the 36th Chamber (1980)
  3. Disciples of the 36th Chamber (1985)
- Three Colors
  1. Three Colors: Blue (1993)
  2. Three Colors: White (1994)
  3. Three Colors: Red (1994)
- Three Flavours Cornetto
  1. Shaun of the Dead (2004)
  2. Hot Fuzz (2007)
  3. The World's End (2013)
- The Three Mothers
  1. Suspiria (1977)
  2. Inferno (1980)
  3. The Mother of Tears (2007)
- Three Smart Girls
  1. Three Smart Girls (1936)
  2. Three Smart Girls Grow Up (1939)
  3. Hers to Hold (1943)
- Thunder in Paradise *
  1. Thunder in Paradise (1993) (V)
  2. Thunder in Paradise II (1994) (V)
  3. Thunder in Paradise 3 (1995) (V)
- Thunder Warrior
  1. Thunder Warrior (1983)
  2. Thunder Warrior II (1987)
  3. Thunder Warrior III (1988)
- Thunderbirds (1980 series) *
  1. Thunderbirds to the Rescue (1980) (TV)
  2. Thunderbirds in Outer Space (1981) (TV)
  3. Countdown to Disaster (1982) (TV)
- Tiger Cage
  1. Tiger Cage (1988)
  2. Tiger Cage 2 (1990)
  3. Tiger Cage 3 (1991)
- Tiger Claws
  1. Tiger Claws (1992)
  2. Tiger Claws II (1996)
  3. Tiger Claws III (1999)
- Tillie Banks-Tinklepaw
  1. Tillie's Punctured Romance (1914)
  2. Tillie's Tomato Surprise (1915)
  3. Tillie Wakes Up (1917)
- The Time Trilogy
  1. San (1966)
  2. Jutro (1967)
  3. Podne (1968)
- To All the Boys
  1. To All the Boys I've Loved Before (2018)
  2. To All the Boys: P.S. I Still Love You (2020)
  3. To All the Boys: Always and Forever, Lara Jean (2020)
- Tom Ripley
  1. The Talented Mr. Ripley (1999)
  2. Ripley's Game (2002)
  3. Ripley Under Ground (2005)
- Tomb Raider
  1. Lara Croft: Tomb Raider (2001)
  2. Lara Croft: Tomb Raider – The Cradle of Life (2003)
  3. Tomb Raider (2018) (reboot)
- Topper *
  1. Topper (1937)
  2. Topper Takes a Trip (1938)
  3. Topper Returns (1941)
- A Town Without Christmas
  1. A Town Without Christmas (2001) (TV)
  2. Finding John Christmas (2003) (TV)
  3. When Angels Come to Town (2004) (TV)
- Trailer Park Boys *
  1. Trailer Park Boys: The Movie (2006)
  2. Trailer Park Boys: Countdown to Liquor Day (2009)
  3. Trailer Park Boys: Don't Legalize It (2014)
- Transmorphers
  1. Transmorphers (2007)
  2. Transmorphers: Fall of Man (2009)
  3. Transmorphers: Mech Beasts (2023)
- The Transylvanians
  1. The Prophet, the Gold and the Transylvanians (1978)
  2. The Actress, the Dollars and the Transylvanians (1979)
  3. The Oil, the Baby and the Transylvanians (1981)
- 'Trigger' Tim Rand
  1. Frontier Crusader (1940)
  2. Arizona Gang Busters (1940)
  3. The Texas Marshal (1941)
- Trilogy of Americana (Terry Gilliam)
  1. The Fisher King (1991)
  2. 12 Monkeys (1995)
  3. Fear and Loathing in Las Vegas (1998)
- Trilogy of Imagination (Terry Gilliam)
  1. Time Bandits (1981)
  2. Brazil (1985)
  3. The Adventures of Baron Munchausen (1988)
- Trinity
  1. They Call Me Trinity (1970)
  2. Trinity Is Still My Name (1971)
  3. Sons of Trinity (1995)
- Troll
  1. Troll (1986)
  2. Troll 2 (1990) (aka Goblins)
  3. Troll 3 (1990) (aka Ator III: The Hobgoblin)
- Trolls **
  1. Trolls (2016)
  2. Trolls World Tour (2020)
  3. Trolls Band Together (2023)
- Tron *
  1. Tron (1982)
  2. Tron: Legacy (2010)
  3. Tron: Ares (2025)
- Tugboat Annie
  1. Tugboat Annie (1933)
  2. Tugboat Annie Sails Again (1940)
  3. Captain Tugboat Annie (1945)
- Turbulence
  1. Turbulence (1997)
  2. Turbulence 2: Fear of Flying (1999) (V)
  3. Turbulence 3: Heavy Metal (2001) (V)
- A Turtle's Tale (A) *
  1. A Turtle's Tale: Sammy's Adventures (2010)
  2. A Turtle's Tale 2: Sammy's Escape from Paradise (2012)
  3. Sammy & Co: Turtle Paradise (2017)

== U ==
- Ultraman Tiga
  1. Ultraman Tiga & Ultraman Dyna: Warriors of the Star of Light (1998)
  2. Ultraman Tiga & Ultraman Dyna & Ultraman Gaia: Battle in Hyperspace (1999)
  3. Ultraman Tiga: The Final Odyssey (2000)
- Unbreakable
  1. Unbreakable (2000)
  2. Split (2016)
  3. Glass (2019)
- The Untouchables *
  1. The Scarface Mob (1959) (TV)
  2. The Revenge of Al Capone (1989) (TV)
  3. The Return of Eliot Ness (1991) (TV)
- Up Pompeii! *
  1. Up Pompeii (1971)
  2. Up the Chastity Belt (1971)
  3. Up the Front (1972)
- Uptown Saturday Night
  1. Uptown Saturday Night (1974)
  2. Let's Do It Again (1975)
  3. A Piece of the Action (1977)
- Urban Legend
  1. Urban Legend (1998)
  2. Urban Legends: Final Cut (2000)
  3. Urban Legends: Bloody Mary (2005) (V)
- U.S. Seals
  1. U.S. Seals (2000) (V)
  2. U.S. Seals II: The Ultimate Force (2001) (V)
  3. U.S. Seals 3: Frogmen (2002) (V)
- USA: Land of Opportunities
  1. Dogville (2003)
  2. Manderlay (2005)
  3. Washington (2009) (never made)

== V ==
- Vampires
  1. Vampires (1998)
  2. Vampires: Los Muertos (2002) (V)
  3. Vampires: The Turning (2005) (V)
- Van Wilder
  1. Van Wilder (2002)
  2. Van Wilder: The Rise of Taj (2006)
  3. Van Wilder: Freshman Year (2009) (V) (prequel)
- The Vengeance Trilogy
  1. Sympathy for Mr. Vengeance (2002)
  2. Oldboy (2003)
  3. Sympathy for Lady Vengeance (2005)
- Vietnam War
  1. Platoon (1986)
  2. Born on the Fourth of July (1989)
  3. Heaven & Earth (1993)
- The Vineyard
  1. Autumn in the Vineyard (2016) (TV)
  2. Summer in the Vineyard (2017) (TV)
  3. Valentine in the Vineyard (2019) (TV)
- The Vizconde Massacre Story (God Help Us!)
  1. The Vizconde Massacre Story (God Help Us!) (1993)
  2. The Untold Story: Vizconde Massacre II - May the Lord Be with Us (1994)
  3. Jessica Alfaro Story (1995)

== W ==
- Wally "The Fox" Benton
  1. Whistling in the Dark (1941)
  2. Whistling in Dixie (1942)
  3. Whistling in Brooklyn (1943)
- Warlock
  1. Warlock (1989)
  2. Warlock: The Armageddon (1993)
  3. Warlock III: The End of Innocence (1999) (V)
- The Weight of Chains
  1. The Weight of Chains (2011)
  2. The Weight of Chains 2 (2014)
  3. The Weight of Chains 3 (2019)
- White Collar Hooligan
  1. The Rise and Fall of a White Collar Hooligan (2012) (V)
  2. The Rise and Fall of a White Collar Hooligan 2: England Away (2013) (V)
  3. White Collar Hooligan 3 (2014) (V)
- The Wild Thornberrys *
  1. The Wild Thornberrys: The Origin of Donnie (2001) (TV)
  2. The Wild Thornberrys Movie (2002)
  3. Rugrats Go Wild! (2003)
- The Wilderness Family
  1. The Adventures of the Wilderness Family (1975)
  2. The Further Adventures of the Wilderness Family (1978)
  3. Mountain Family Robinson (1979)
- Witchboard
  1. Witchboard (1986)
  2. Witchboard 2: The Devil's Doorway (1993)
  3. Witchboard III: The Possession (1995)
- Witchouse
  1. Witchouse (1999) (V)
  2. Witchouse 2: Blood Coven (1999) (V)
  3. Witchouse 3: Demon Fire (2001) (V)
- The Wizard of Oz (1914 series)
  1. The Patchwork Girl of Oz (1914)
  2. The Magic Cloak of Oz (1914)
  3. His Majesty, the Scarecrow of Oz (1914)
- Wolf Creek *
  1. Wolf Creek (2005)
  2. Wolf Creek 2 (2013)
  3. Wolf Cre3k (2027)
- The Work and the Glory
  1. The Work and the Glory: Pillar of Light (2004)
  2. The Work and the Glory II: American Zion (2005)
  3. The Work and the Glory III: A House Divided (2006)
- Would I Lie to You? (La Vérité si je mens !)
  1. Would I Lie to You? (1997)
  2. Would I Lie to You? 2 (2001)
  3. Would I Lie to You? 3 (2012)

== X ==
- X
  1. X (2022)
  2. Pearl (2022) (prequel)
  3. MaXXXine (2024)
- Xtro
  1. Xtro (1983)
  2. Xtro II: The Second Encounter (1990)
  3. Xtro 3: Watch the Skies (1993)
- XXX
  1. XXX (2002)
  2. XXX: State of the Union (2005)
  3. XXX: Return of Xander Cage (2017)

== Y ==
- Yi Sun-sin
  1. The Admiral: Roaring Currents (2014)
  2. Hansan: Rising Dragon (2022) (prequel)
  3. Noryang: Deadly Sea (2023)
- You Got Served
  1. You Got Served (2004)
  2. You Got Served: Beat the World (2011)
  3. You Got Served 2 (2019)

== Z ==
- Zenon
  1. Zenon: Girl of the 21st Century (1999) (TV)
  2. Zenon: The Zequel (2001) (TV)
  3. Zenon: Z3 (2004) (TV)
- Zoombies
  1. Zoombies (2016)
  2. Zoombies 2 (2019) (prequel)
  3. Aquarium of the Dead (2021) (spin-off)
- Zorro (1969–1971) (Note: A series where the titular character is portrayed by Carlos Quiney.)
  1. Zorro's Latest Adventure (1969)
  2. Zorro, Rider of Vengeance (1971)
  3. Zorro the Invincible (1971)
