= Takeshi Caesar =

Japanese actor and shoot boxer

- Born: Tomofumi Murata; 17 August 1955 (age 70); Yamaguchi, Japan
- Other names: Caesar
- Nationality: (Japan) Japanese
- Division: Welterweight
- Style: Shoot boxing

Tomofumi Murata (村田 友文, Murata Tomofumi) (born August 17, 1955), better known by his ring name Takeshi Caesar (シーザー武志, Shīzā Takeshi), is a Japanese actor, retired kickboxer and the founder of shoot boxing.

== Career ==
Murata started competing in kickboxing at age of 16, being trained in the Nishio Gym. He adopted the name of Takeshi Caesar and won the Asia Pacific Kickboxing Federation Welterweight Championship, making a name for himself. In 1984, he became interested in professional wrestling and was introduced to Satoru Sayama, who trained him in shoot-style at his Super Tiger Gym. Caesar then was contacted by Karl Gotch and Akira Maeda and was part of the Universal Wrestling Federation. After the fall of UWF, his experiences with its wrestling style induced him to creating a similarly mixed style of kickboxing, which he called shootboxing. His company had his first event in 1985, and had working agreements with Newborn UWF and later with Fighting Network RINGS and Pancrase.

== Championships and accomplishments ==
- Asia Pacific Kickboxing Federation
  - APKF Welterweight Championship (1 time)
  - APKF Middleweight championship (1 time)
- Japan Shootboxing Association
  - JSBA Hawkweight 1st champion (1986)
- World Shootboxing Association
  - WSBA Hawkweight 1st champion (1988)

== Kickboxing record ==
Takeshi Caesar kickboxing record
Date	Result	Opponent	Event	Location	Method	Round	Time	Record
1990-08-26	Loss	(United States) Steve MacKey	Shoot Boxing - East vs. West: Mixed Martial Arts Battle	Tokyo, Japan	KO (Punches)	2	3:26	
1990-05-30	Win	(Japan) Riki Tadakatsu		Osaka, Japan				
1989-11-04	Win	(United States) Bill Rastorfer	Shoot Boxing Clash III	Tokyo, Japan	KO (Low kick)	2	2:31	
1989-05-26	Loss	(United States) Manson Gibson	Shoot Boxing - Clash II	Yokohama, Japan	KO	1	4:28	
Loses WSBA Shootboxing Hawkweight title
1988-11-05	Win	(Thailand) Lakchart Sor.Prasartporn	Shootboxing vs Muay Thai Vol.2	Tokyo, Japan	KO (Right cross)	1	6:49	
1988-08-13	Win	(Thailand) Payap Premchai	UWF The Professional Bout	Tokyo, Japan	KO (Body kick)	1	2:36	
1988-05-21	Win	(United States) John Navarolli	Shootboxing Worldrevolution Declaration	Tokyo, Japan	KO (Body kick)	1	5:08	
Wins inaugural WSBA Shootboxing Hawkweight title
1988-01-31	Loss	(Iran) Farid Dordar	Shoot Boxing World Revolution Declaration I	Tokyo, Japan	2nd Ext.R Decision	5	3:00	
1987-10-10	Win	(Japan) Koichi Kaneshiro (Japan) Masaaki Ikemiya	Shoot Boxing Ishu Kakutogisen #5	Tokyo, Japan	TKO	2	2:17	
Special rules fight. Kaneshiro and Ikemiya relayed each other each round.
1987-12-05	Win	(Canada) Dennis Crawford	Shootboxing vs Canada Martial Arts	Tokyo, Japan	KO (Right cross)	2	2:08	
1987-11-09	Win	(Japan) Nobuhiro Kikuchi		Osaka, Japan	TKO (3 Knockdowns)		5:58	
1987-07-12	Win	(Japan) Riki Tadakatsu	Shoot Boxing Ishu Kakutogisen #4	Tokyo, Japan	Decision	5	3:00	
Defends JSBA Shootboxing Hawkweight title
1987-05-30	Win	(United States) James White	Shoot Boxing Ishu Kakutogisen #3	Tokyo, Japan	TKO (retirement)	1	3:30	
1987-03-21	Win	(Thailand) Charlie Aor.Chaofah	Shoot Boxing Ishu Kakutogisen #2	Tokyo, Japan	2nd Ext.R Decision	5	3:00	
1987-01-31	Win	(United States) James Bashim	Shoot Boxing Ishu Kakutogisen #1	Tokyo, Japan	KO (High kick)	2	1:35	
Legend Win Loss Draw/No contest Notes

== Filmography ==
Year	Title	Role
1990	Tekken	Minoru Hiraoka
1991	Ote	Onitsume
1995	Kamikaze Takushi	Yakuza
1995	Shinjuku Triad Society	Karino
1995	Shin daisan no gokudō: boppatsu Kansai gokudō sensō	Hazama
1996	The Way to Fight	-
1996	Fudoh: The New Generation	Kyushu yakuza leader
1997	Full Metal Yakuza	Tosa
1997	Kishiwada Shonen Gurentai: Chikemuri junjô-hen	Bar owner
1998	Kishiwada Shōnen Gurentai: Bōkyō	Riichi's uncle
1999	Ley Lines	-
2004	Izo	Samurai

== See also ==
- Shoot boxing
