= Teruyoshi Nakano =

Japanese special effects director (1935–2022)

- 中野 昭慶
- Nakano on set of Terror of Mechagodzilla.
- Born: October 9, 1935; Andong, Manchukuo
- Died: June 27, 2022 (aged 86)
- Occupation: Special effects director
- Years active: 1959–2001

Teruyoshi "Shokei" Nakano (中野 昭慶, Nakano Teruyoshi; October 9, 1935 – June 27, 2022) was a Japanese special effects director. He is best known for helming the special effects of the last six Showa Godzilla films and The Return of Godzilla (1984).

== Early life ==
Nakano was born on October 9, 1935 in Andong, Manchukuo (now Dandong, Liaoning, China). His father worked for an affiliate of South Manchuria Railway called International Transport. His childhood was characterized by wealth, and he attended Andō Yamato Arimichi National Elementary School. His family was transported to Niihama, Ehime, Japan after Japan's defeat in 1945, where he graduated elementary school before moving to Kyoto two years later.

== Filmography ==
=== Film and television ===
Year	Title	SFX director	Assistant SFX director	Notes
1956	Night School	No	No	Assistant director (trainee)
1959	Submarine I-57 Will Not Surrender	No	Yes	
1960	The Secret of the Telegian	No	Yes	
1960	Storm Over the Pacific	No	Yes	
1962	Gorath	No	Yes	
1962	King Kong vs. Godzilla	No	Yes	
1963	Matango	No	Yes	
1963	Atragon	No	Yes	
1964	Mothra vs. Godzilla	No	Yes	
1964	Ghidorah, the Three-Headed Monster	No	Yes	
1965	Frankenstein Conquers the World	No	Yes	
1965	Invasion of Astro-Monster	No	Yes	
1966	The War of the Gargantuas	No	Yes	
1966	Ebirah, Horror of the Deep	No	Yes	
1967	King Kong Escapes	No	Yes	
1968	Destroy All Monsters	No	Yes	
1969	All Monsters Attack	Yes	No	With Ishirō Honda; Uncredited
1970	The Vampire Doll	Yes	No	
1971	Battle of Okinawa	Yes	No	
1971	Godzilla vs. Hedorah	Yes	No	
1971	Lake of Dracula	Yes	No	Uncredited
1972	Godzilla vs. Gigan	Yes	No	
1973	Zone Fighter	Yes	No	TV series
1973	Godzilla vs. Megalon	Yes	No	
1973	Submersion of Japan	Yes	No	
1974	Godzilla vs. Mechagodzilla	Yes	No	
1974	Prophecies of Nostradamus	Yes	No	
1974	ESPY	Yes	No	
1974	Evil of Dracula	Yes	No	
1975	Terror of Mechagodzilla	Yes	No	
1975	Conflagration	Yes	No	
1977	The War in Space	Yes	No	
1980	Deathquake	Yes	No	
1981	Imperial Navy	Yes	No	
1984	The Return of Godzilla	Yes	No	
1985	Pulgasari	Yes	No	
1987	Tokyo Blackout	Yes	No	
1987	Princess from the Moon	Yes	No	
