= The Way to Fight =

1996 film by Takashi Miike

- Directed by: Takashi Miike
- Written by: Story: Seijun Ninomiya; Screenplay: Masa Nakamura
- Produced by: Kazuo Suzaki
- Cinematography: Hideo Yamamoto
- Release date: September 27, 1996
- Running time: 114 minutes
- Country: Japan
- Language: Japanese

The Way to Fight (喧嘩の花道 大阪最強伝説, Kenka no hanamichi: Ōsaka saikyō densetsu) is a 1996 Japanese film directed by Takashi Miike. The film is based on Seijun Ninomiya's novel of the same name, a fictionalized account on the lives of Hidekazu Akai and Akira Maeda.

== Plot ==
The film opens in the Tokyo Dome in the 1990s, on the eve of a highly anticipated match between two fighters from Osaka with a past together: boxing champion Kazuyoshi Tamai (Kyosuke Yabe) and professional wrestling champion Takeshi Hamada (Kazuki Kitamura). The narration then jumps 20 years back to show how they met each other.

In Osaka in the 1970s, a teenaged Kazuyoshi builds a reputation as the toughest street fighter in Naniwa West High School. He lives a troubled home life with his senile grandmother and spends the days on the streets with his friend Toshio and his schoolmate Ritsuko. Toshio, a shy, insecure boy who fears he might inherit his father's mental illness, is secretly in love with Ritsuko, who in turn loves Kazuyoshi, but the latter only has eyes for fighting, his only way to express himself. Then he crosses paths with Takeshi Hamada (Kazuki Kitamura), a student at a rival high school and an excellent fighter in his own right, who introduces himself beating down the gang of bullies that are Kazuyoshi's usual enemies. Takeshi is shown to have his own troubled life, living alone with an abusive father and only rarely seeing his divorced mother and sister.

Kazuyoshi is determined to challenge Takeshi one on one, but because of a series of unforeseen circumstances, his ambition for a final battle is constantly and comically thwarted. At the same time, Takeshi meets Kurata, a young karate master who humiliates him in a street fight and later takes him under his wing. Takeshi forms a bond with Kurata upon discovering the latter ran away from his own abusive father, and by training with him he learns to control his aggression. Meanwhile, Toshio is assaulted by a patron (played by Takeshi Miike) in the decrepit restaurant he and Kazuyoshi work part-time in, and in a moment of freeing his repressed anger, he stabs the patron. He then goes to confess his feelings to Ritsuko, but he is rejected. Ritsuko herself is urged by her mother to study hard and leave Osaka for good, meaning she will not go out with Kazuyoshi either.

By the time Kazuyoshi and Takeshi meet and are ready for a fight, Takeshi has given up on street fighting altogether. From there, both of them decide to start careers in fighting sports, Kazuyoshi becoming a bantamweight boxer and Takeshi a shoot-style professional wrestler, and both achieve a great success until becoming champions of their respective styles. The film then ends with both forward in the 1990s, getting ready to fight their match and settle their old dispute.

== Cast ==
- Kyôsuke Yabe as Kazuyoshi Tamai
- Kazuki Kitamura as Takeshi Hamada
- Ryoko Imamura as Ritsuko
- Rynosuke Sakai as Karate Kurata
- Takashi Miike as patron
- Takeshi Caesar
- Tomohiko Okuda
- Jirô Watanabe
