= Full Metal Yakuza =

- Japanese home video cover
- FULL METAL 極道
- Directed by: Takashi Miike
- Screenplay by: Itaru Era
- Produced by: Yuji Nagamori; Naoki Abe
- Starring: Tsuyoshi Ujiki; Shoko Nakahara; Tomorowo Taguchi; Ren Ogugi
- Cinematography: Shoei Ando
- Edited by: Yasushi Shimamura
- Music by: Koji Endo
- Production companies: Tokuma Japan; Excellent Film
- Distributed by: Tokuma Japan Communications
- Release date: December 5, 1997 (Japan)
- Running time: 104 minutes
- Country: Japan
- Language: Japanese

Full Metal Yakuza (FULL METAL 極道) is a 1997 Japanese tokusatsu action film directed by Takashi Miike. It was written by Itaru Era and based on a story by Hiroki Yamaguchi.

Originally released in Japan's direct-to-video market (V-Cinema), the film has gained more popularity because of the reputation of its controversial director.

== Plot ==
Yakuza boss Tosa (Takeshi Caesar) abandons his girlfriend Yukari in order to kill a rival named Masashirenbo but fails to finish the job and is sent to prison for seven years. Upon his release, he is welcomed back by aspiring yakuza Kensuke Hagane (Tsuyoshi Ujiki), who idolizes Tosa and has been holding his wallet all this time. The two are unexpectedly taken to a location where they are shot by rivals seeking to have their superior Saratake selected as boss of the entire family instead of Tosa. Their bodies wind up in the hands of a scientist named Genpaku Hiraga, who attempts to turn the dying Kensuke into a hero of justice by replacing much of his body with cyborg pieces as well as the heart, full-back rising koi tattoo, and other parts of the deceased Tosa, making him bulletproof and extremely strong.

Kensuke, who can now only consume metal for energy, leaves the scientist to seek revenge on the people who killed Tosa as Hiraga remotely monitors the battle capabilities of his cyborg creation, whom he nicknames "Lead", though a laptop computer. At a driving range he finds the duplicitous gang members who led him and Tosa to be killed and forces the underboss Maeda to give up the name of the killer, Kamane Haga. Junji has begun sleeping with Hagane's old girlfriend Naomi and Hagane warns him not to hurt her.

Hagane fights his way into Chief Fuku's office and kills the men who shot him and Tosa. Before being killed, Kamane reveals that Maeda and Saratake were behind it all. Hagane returns to the headquarters of the Nakame, his former clan, where Saratake kills Maeda and attempts to lay all the blame on him, offering to make Hagane his new underboss. Taka prevents Hagane from killing Saratake.

Hagane forms a relationship Yukari and must use a special command that Hiraga taught him in order to control his emotions and prevent a short circuit. Yukari eventually leaves him because she will not be able to forget Tosa while looking at his rising koi tattoo on Hagane's back, then she attacks Saratake while posing as a caddie on a golf course but is stopped by Taka. Junji brings Hagane a photo of a naked and chained Yukari, enraging Hagane. Saratake calls and tells Hagane to kill Masashirenbo in exchange for Yukari. Hagane kills Masashirenbo and experiences Tosa's memories of Yukari's disappointment in him.

Taka sends men with explosives to blow up Hagane's beach shanty but Hagane senses the killers approaching and escapes with Jinji to safety, leaving only his detached cyborg eye to make them believe that he has been killed. Saratake and Fuku decide to find the doctor who built Hagane in order to gain more robot soldiers to fight against their rival Nishida. Jinji, upset that he would also have been killed in the explosion, joins sides with Hagane and drives him to where Yukari is being held. Taka rapes Yukari and she bites off her own tongue to commit suicide.

Fuku attempts to run over Hagane but instead crashes into his metal body, destroying the car. Hagane, unfazed by bullets, kills everyone in his way but finds Yukari already dead. Taka mortally wounds Hagane using a shotgun before Hagane cuts him in half with a katana. The beat of Tosa's heart slows as Saratake enters and shoots him in the mouth, inadvertently feeding him metal and giving enough energy to kill Saratake. The film ends with Jinji bringing the doctor to Hagane to rebuild him.

== Cast ==
- Tsuyoshi Ujiki - Kensuke Hagane
- Tomorowo Taguchi - Genpaku Hiraga
- Takeshi Caesar - Tosa
- Kazuki Kitamura - Matsuba
- Yuichi Minato
- Shoko Nakahara - Yukari
- Momoko Nishida - Naomi
- Ren Osugi - Nakame
- Manzo Shinra
- Koji Tsukamoto - Junji

== Release ==
Full Metal Yakuza was released direct-to-video in Japan by Tokuma Japan Communications on December 5, 1997.
