= Shinjuku Triad Society =

- Theatrical release poster
- Directed by: Takashi Miike
- Written by: Ichirō Fujita
- Produced by: Tetsuya Ikeda; Toshiki Kimura; Ken Takeuchi; Tsutomu Tsuchikawa
- Starring: Kippei Shiina; Tomorowo Taguchi; Takeshi Caesar; Ren Osugi
- Cinematography: Naosuke Imaizumi
- Edited by: Yasushi Shimamura
- Music by: Atorie Shira
- Release date: August 26, 1995 (Japan)
- Running time: 100 minutes
- Country: Japan
- Languages: Japanese; Mandarin; Taiwanese Hokkien

Shinjuku Triad Society (Japanese: 新宿黒社会 チャイナ マフィア戦争, Hepburn: Shinjuku kuroshakai: Chaina mafia sensô) is a 1995 Japanese film directed by Takashi Miike. The film is one of the earliest examples of Miike's use of extreme violence and unusual characterization, two aspects he would become notorious for. The film is part of the Black Society trilogy and is followed by Rainy Dog and Ley Lines.

== Plot ==
The film recounts the interactions of the Dragon's Claw triad society and its homosexual leader Wang Zhi-Ming with a renegade police officer named Tatushito as well as opposing yakuza organizations. When Tatsuhito's younger brother Yoshihito becomes the lawyer to the triad society, an argument between the two brothers leads to the downfall of the organization.

== Cast ==
Actor	Role
Kippei Shiina	Kiriya Ryujin
Tomorowo Taguchi	Wang
Takeshi Caesar	Karino
Ren Osugi	Yakuza boss
Sabu	Shusuke Shimada
Yukie Itou	
Kyosuke Izutsu	
Kazuhiro Mashiko	Jun
Airi Yanagi	

== Release ==
Shinjuku Triad Society was released in Japan on 26 August 1995. Arrow Video released the film on Blu-ray on 24 January 2017.

== Reception ==
Sight & Sound noted the film was similar to the gangster films of Kinji Fukasaku, while noting that "scenes such as the one where sodomy is used as a police interrogation technique bear Miike's unmistakable signature." Time Out London stated that "Even viewers hardened to the perversities which tend to crop up in Japanese exploitation genres may find themselves rubbing their eyes at some of the images and incidents in Miike's extremist thriller" and that "Miike's stylish, gleeful direction establishes him as the most distinctive new 'voice' in the genre since Rokuro Mochizuki."
