= Ley Lines (film) =

1999 Japanese film

- Theatrical release poster

Japanese name
- Kanji: 日本黒社会 LEY LINES
Transcriptions
- Romanization: Nihon Kuroshakai Rei Rainzu
- Directed by: Takashi Miike
- Screenplay by: Ichiro Ryu
- Produced by: Toshiki Kimura
- Starring: Kazuki Kitamura; Tomorowo Taguchi; Daan Li; Naoto Takenaka; Show Aikawa
- Cinematography: Naosuke Imaizumi
- Edited by: Yasushi Shimamura
- Music by: Koji Endo
- Production companies: Daiei; Excellent Film
- Distributed by: Daiei
- Release date: May 22, 1999 (Japan)
- Running time: 105 minutes
- Country: Japan
- Language: Japanese; Mandarin; Cantonese; Hokkien

Ley Lines (Japanese: 日本黒社会 LEY LINES, Hepburn: Nihon Kuroshakai Rei Rainzu; literally "Japan Underworld: Ley Lines") is a 1999 Japanese yakuza film directed by Takashi Miike. It is the third film in his Black Society trilogy, following 1995's Shinjuku Triad Society and 1997's Rainy Dog. The film stars Kazuki Kitamura, Tomorowo Taguchi, Daan Li, Naoto Takenaka and Show Aikawa.

Like many of Miike's works, the film examines the underbelly of respectable Japanese society and the problems of assimilation faced by non-ethnically Japanese people in Japan. The English title refers to ley lines, the paranormal concept of geographic lines of energy based on the placement of landmarks.

== Plot ==
Ryuichi, his younger brother Shunrei, and their friend Chan are a trio of Japanese youths of Chinese descent who escape their semi-rural upbringing and relocate to Shinjuku, Tokyo. Their wallets are stolen by a Shanghai prostitute nicknamed "Wild Pussy" so they turn to selling bottles of the recreational inhalant toluene in order to earn money. They later make up with the prostitute, whose real name is Anita, when she quits selling her body after being abused by a client and then her pimp.

The three youths buy fake passports and a gun through the black market, intending to stow away on a boat to Brazil. Together with Anita, they rob money from a triad boss named Wong, during which Anita kicks her former pimp. Ikeda and Barbie of the toluene ring ambush them and shoot Chan before the others escape. Triads arrive and Barbie tells them that Ikeda took the money before they shoot him dead. Chan dies in the car after asking the others to give his share of the money to his mother. Shunrei quickly pedals his bike Chan's mother's house to give her the share, but is caught and run over by Wong's men in a truck on his way back. While Ryuichi and Anita are searching for him, Wong's men spot them and chase them in the truck before smashing into a pile of corrugated metal and dying.

Ryuichi and Anita reach the port and give money to the shipowner but discover Wong waiting for them. Anita shoots Wong dead, then Ryuichi and Anita jump into the water and money goes floating everywhere as Wong's men fire repeatedly into the water. Ryuichi and Anita are then shown rowing a boat away, though they are covered in blood, presumably indicating that they are already dead.

== Cast ==
- Kazuki Kitamura as Ryuichi
- Tomorowo Taguchi as Chan
- Daan Li as Anita
- Michisuke Kashiwaya as Shunrei
- Naoto Takenaka as Wong
- Show Aikawa as Ikeda
- Samuel Pop Aning as Barbie
- Atsushi Okuno as Yokota
- Far-long Oh as Pimp
- Tetsu Watanabe as Kondō
- Yōzaburō Itō as Sadistic client
- Ren Osugi as Junkyard Owner
- Shun Sugata as Cop
- Ryushi Mizukami as Passport forger
- Kōji Tsukamoto as Passport official

== Release ==
Ley Lines was released in theatres in Japan on May 22, 1999. Arrow Video released the film on Blu-ray on 24 January 2017.

== Reception ==
Sight & Sound found the film to be the "most accomplished" of Miike's Black Society trilogy, where "Miike's stylistic flamboyance is balanced by narrative coherence." The review negatively pointed out that "There are moments of sexual horror that play awkwardly for laughs and the immigrant experience isn't explored in great depth, but this is a highly compelling work." Grady Hendrix (The New York Sun), referred to the film as "the most technically accomplished of the Black Society Trilogy".
