= New Mr. Vampire 2 =

1991 Hong Kong film by Ng Kwok-hao

New Mr. Vampire 2, also known as The Funny Vampire, is a 1991 Hong Kong comedy horror film directed by Ng Kwok-Hao. This film is the sequel to the first film New Mr. Vampire.

== Cast ==
- Pauline Wong Siu-Fung as Xiao Feng
- Huang Ha as Vampire
- Tai Bo as Bao
- Chin Yuet-Sang as Master Xing's fellow disciple
- Jack Lung Sai-Ga as Master Xing
- Wong Kwan-Hong as Kang
- Wong Yi-Yin as Ting Ting
- Wong Dik as Little Vampire

== Home media ==
=== VHS ===
Release date	Country	Classifaction	Publisher	Format	Language	Subtitles	Notes
Unknown	Taiwan	Unknown	Ocean Shores Video Limited	Unknown	Chinese	English & Chinese	
Unknown	Japan	Unknown	Pack-in Video	Unknown	Chinese	Japanese	

=== LaserDisc ===
Release date	Country	Classifaction	Publisher	Format	Language	Subtitles	Notes
Unknown	Hong Kong	Unknown	Ocean Shores Video Limited	CLV/PAL	Chinese	English & Chinese	

=== VCD ===
Release date	Country	Classifaction	Publisher	Format	Language	Subtitles	Notes
Unknown	Hong Kong	Unknown	Ocean Shores Video Limited	PAL	Chinese	English & Chinese	
