= Black Society trilogy =

- Directed by: Takashi Miike
- Screenplay by: Ichirō Fujita; Seigo Inoue; Ichiro Ryu
- Starring: Tomorowo Taguchi
- Release dates: 26 August 1995 (Shinjuku Triad Society); 28 June 1997 (Rainy Dog); 22 May 1999 (Ley Lines)
- Country: Japan
- Languages: Japanese; Mandarin; Taiwanese Hokkien

The Kuroshakai trilogy (黒社会三部作, Kuro-shakai Sanbusaku), also known as the Black Society trilogy, is a series of films directed by Japanese filmmaker Takashi Miike involving Chinese triads and Japanese yakuza.

The series includes three separate films without storyline crossovers, and were each released two years apart between 1995 and 1999. Tomorowo Taguchi plays a prominent role in all three of the films, albeit as a different character in each.

The term kuro-shakai is a Japanese word literally meaning "black society" or underworld.

== Films ==
Year	English title	Japanese title	Translation	Screenplay
1995	Shinjuku Triad Society	新宿 黒社会 チャイナ マフィア 戦争; Shinjuku Kuroshakai: Chaina Mafia Sensō	Shinjuku Underworld: Chinese Mafia War	Ichirō Fujita
1997	Rainy Dog	極道 黒社会 RAINY DOG; Gokudō Kuroshakai: Rainy Dog	Gangster Underworld: Rainy Dog	Seigo Inoue
1999	Ley Lines	日本 黒社会 LEY LINES; Nihon Kuroshakai: Ley Lines	Japan Underworld: Ley Lines	Ichiro Ryu

== Features of the trilogy ==
Similar to Dead or Alive, this is also an anomalous trilogy, as the three films are connected to each other only by the presence of actor Tomorowo Taguchi, while the stories are dissimilar to each other and tell of men and women uprooted from their homeland, China or Japan, employed by the Chinese Triad or the Yakuza.

=== Shinjuku Triad Society ===
The first film of the trilogy is set in Shinjuku Ward and tells of a corrupt policeman of Chinese origin who, investigating the murders commissioned by a Taiwanese boss, discovers that his brother lawyer is involved in an organ trafficking run which starts a war between police and criminals.

=== Rainy Dog ===
The second film in the trilogy is set in Taipei and is about Yuji, an exiled Japanese yakuza forced to work as a hitman for the local Triad. A woman entrusts him with a mute child, claiming that the boy is Yuji's son. The boy starts following Yuji, who meets a Taiwanese prostitute and thus creates a kind of family.

The cop-brother-criminal triangle from the previous film is translated here into these three characters, while the incessant rain recalls the decadent atmosphere of the Shinjuku neighborhood.

=== Ley Lines ===
With the third film of the trilogy, Takashi Miike said he wanted to bring his characters back to Shinjuku ward, retracing their past. In fact, the film tells of three boys of Chinese origins who dream of leaving Japan for Brazil. To illegally enter the South American country, the three are forced to work for the underworld and meet a prostitute who joins them.

== Reception ==
Grady Hendrix of The New York Sun, commented on the Trilogy, noting that "the three movies that make up his loosely related Black Society Trilogy are the work of a socially committed, ferociously intelligent director - albeit one who still takes time out from raging against the machine for raunchy sex jokes and blunt-force trauma."

Jasper Sharp of the British Film Institute commented on the series, stating that among Miike's gangster films, the trilogy was "widely seen as among his best" with "Miike’s fast-paced cutting, acutely-developed and innovative mise-en-scène and hyperbolic approach to onscreen violence spring to the fore, although there is plenty more going on beneath the bombastic onscreen onslaught."

Budd Wilkins of Slant Magazine said: "[...] these films find Miike articulating themes of social alienation and aberration that would resound throughout his filmography."
