= Shiloh (franchise) =

Shiloh is a media franchise that includes four novels and three films.

== Books ==
=== Shiloh ===
Shiloh is a Newbery Medal-winning children's novel by Phyllis Reynolds Naylor published in 1991. The 65th book by Naylor, it is the first in a trilogy about a young boy and the title character, an abused dog. Naylor decided to write Shiloh after an emotionally taxing experience in West Virginia where she encountered an abused dog.

Narrator and protagonist Marty Preston lives in the hills of Friendly, West Virginia. After finding an abused beagle owned by his brutal neighbor Judd Travers, Marty defies his society's standards of not meddling with each other's business. Marty resolves to steal and hide the dog, naming him Shiloh and fabricating a web of lies to keep his secret. After his theft is discovered, Marty discovers Judd shooting a deer out of season and blackmails him into selling Shiloh to him. Because he lacks the money to buy Shiloh, Marty resolutely works for Judd doing numerous chores.

Primarily a Bildungsroman and adventure novel, the novel depicts the emotional tribulations and maturing of an 11-year-old boy. Some themes of the novel are ethics, consequentialism, religion and morality, and animal–human relationships. Marty learns that morality is confounding and must choose between two unpalatable choices: rescuing the abused Shiloh through stealing and lying and allowing Judd to keep abusing Shiloh.

Reviewers generally gave positive reviews of the book and were impressed by the novel's suspense and vernacular language. In addition to the Newbery Medal, Shiloh has received several state awards voted upon by children, including the Sequoyah Children's Book Award, the Mark Twain Readers Award, and the William Allen White Children's Book Award.

=== Shiloh Season ===
Shiloh Season was published in 1996. In Shiloh Season, Naylor renews the strife by restoring Judd's hostility and aggravating it with a bout of drinking issues. Marty fears Judd will take back Shiloh and be faithless to the deal they made. Whereas in Shiloh Marty confronts the confusing and ambiguous concept of morality, in Shiloh Season he must face the notion of wickedness.

=== Saving Shiloh ===
Saving Shiloh was published in 1997. Marty's parents persuade Marty that people who have wronged are worthy of forgiveness. In the midst of several robberies and a murder, the community hastily faults Judd. Willing to grant Judd a second chance, Marty attempts to help him. Meanwhile, Marty and his family must face the intricacies of life such as death, hostility, and sibling rivalry.

=== A Shiloh Christmas ===
A Shiloh Christmas was published in 2015.

== Films ==
=== Shiloh ===
Shiloh is a family/drama film produced and directed by Dale Rosenbloom in 1996. It was shown at the Heartland Film Festival in 1996, but its general release came on April 27, 1997.

=== Shiloh Season ===
Shiloh 2: Shiloh Season is a 1999 family/drama film about a boy trying to defend his dog from a man who is constantly under the influence.

=== Saving Shiloh ===
Saving Shiloh is a family film produced in 2006. The film is rated PG for some thematic elements and peril.
