= Lake of Dracula =

- Theatrical release poster
- Directed by: Michio Yamamoto
- Screenplay by: Ei Ogawa; Masaru Takesue
- Produced by: Fumio Tankaka
- Starring: Midori Fujita; Sanae Emi; Choei Takahashi
- Cinematography: Rokuro Nishigaki
- Edited by: Hishashi Kondo
- Music by: Riichiro Manabe
- Production company: Toho
- Distributed by: Toho
- Release date: June 16, 1971 (Japan)
- Running time: 81 minutes
- Country: Japan

Lake of Dracula (Japanese: 呪いの館 血を吸う眼, Hepburn: Noroi no yakata - Chi o suu me; lit. "Cursed Mansion: Bloodthirsty Eyes") is a 1971 Japanese horror film directed by Michio Yamamoto.

== Plot ==
A young girl named Akiko loses her dog when walking along a beach. She follows the dog to a European mansion, where an old man stares at her as she chases after the dog inside. Akiko finds herself in front of a dead woman at a piano and then meets the vampire (Mori Kishida). 18 years later, Akiko (Midori Fujita) is living near a lake, still haunted by what has happened to her, which she believes was a dream. Akiko is friends with a boat operator Kusaku, who had received a strange package, which turns out to be a white coffin. Kusaku complains to the shipping agent and returns to find the coffin empty and is then attacked by the same vampire Akiko saw years earlier.

Akiko is then visited by her boyfriend Doctor Takashi Saki (Osahide Takahashi), whom Akiko's sister Natsuko (Sanae Emi) is also in love with. Takashi is called to the hospital when a woman with two bite holes in her neck is turned in. After he leaves, both Akiko's dog and Natsuko go missing. Akiko searches for them and finds her dog dead in a field with Kusaku near by. Kusaku attacks her, which leads to a chase where Akiko is knocked out by a branch. Kusaku takes her back to his home. As Akiko awakens, she sees a vampire just about to bite down on her neck, but is interrupted by two fishermen enquiring about a boat, which makes the vampire and Kusaku retreat. At the hospital, Takashi's patient is beckoned from her bed by the vampire. Takashi spots her, but she falls down a stairway, killing herself. Meanwhile, under the vampire's curse, Natsuko returns to Akiko's home with the vampire himself. Akiko attempts to hide in the closet, while the returning Takashi is attacked in his car by Kusaku. The car crashes and the two battle, with Takashi being victorious after Kusaku expires. After Takashi returns home, both Akiko and Takashi find Natsuko dying on a beach. With her dying breath, Natsuko begs for her corpse to be burned. Takashi and Akiko take her to the hospital for an autopsy.

At the hospital, Natsuko is being prepared in a morgue when she rises from the dead and escapes. At the same Takashi hypnotizes Akiko in order to have her relive her "dream". Akiko then remembers the incident with the vampire from her youth as actually happening and that the incident made her the favourite daughter of both their parents. Along with Takashi, Akiko decides to return to the mansion from the past where they find the dead body of the old man who lived there along with his diary. In it he states that while he is not Japanese his father built the house in a remote part of Japan as he was the descendant of a vampire and wanted to avoid putting others in danger. The old man himself was never a vampire, but at the age of 25 his son succumbed to vampirism and killed a woman. Shortly after a young girl and her dog wandered into the house, found the woman's corpse, and encountered the son after which he was able to help them escape. In response, he locked the son away. The son eventually broke free and fed on his father who wrote the diary before he succumbed to blood loss. The two are then attacked by the vampire and Natsuko. The vampire fights Takashi on a balcony, but the old man, now reanimated as a vampire, grabs the vampire's leg, which causes him to stumble, breaking through the wooden railing that had been damaged during the struggle. A large portion of it impales him through the chest causing him to crumble into dust. Natsuko collapses, the curse broken, as both she and the old man lose their vampiric features and return to being human corpses.

== Production ==
Lake of Dracula was the second of three vampire films made by Toho studios in the 1970s,being preceded by The Vampire Doll (1970) and followed by Evil of Dracula (1974). The director in SFX was Teruyoshi Nakano.

== Release ==
Lake of Dracula was released on June 16, 1971 in Japan where it was distributed by Toho. The film was released in a subtitled format in the United States in August 1973. It was dubbed into English and given a television release in 1980 in the United States by United Productions of America under the title The Lake of Dracula. In the U.S. television prints of the film, the ending involving the vampire disintegrating was removed. The television version was cut to 79 minutes. The film is also known as Dracula's Lust for Blood, The Bloodthirsty Eyes and Lake of Death.

All three films in the trilogy were released on Blu-ray in the United Kingdom and United States by Arrow Films.

== Reception ==
Fredric Milstein of the Los Angeles Times called the film "superficial, unsubtle, humorless yet stylishly horrific, appealingly gruesome and exciting. Rokuro Nishigaki's camera provides lots of atmosphere-loving, as it does, shimmering lakescapes, Martian-like skies and all things tangled branches can hide". In his book Japanese Science Fiction, Fantasy and Horror Films, Stuart Galbraith IV referred to the film as an "acceptable, if unexceptional film" and that "the story is generally routine, but the Eastern locale and attempt (slight as it is) to add a little dimension to its main characters make this somewhat above average for the genre".

== See also ==
- Bloodthirsty, the film trilogy of which Lake of Dracula is a part

== Footnotes ==
=== References ===
- Galbraith IV, Stuart (1994). Japanese Science Fiction, Fantasy and Horror Films. McFarland. ISBN 0-89950-853-7.
- Galbraith IV, Stuart (1996). The Japanese Filmography: 1900 through 1994. McFarland. ISBN 0-7864-0032-3.
- Galbraith IV, Stuart (2008). The Toho Studios Story: A History and Complete Filmography. Scarecrow Press. ISBN 978-1461673743.
