= Bloodthirsty =

Japanese vampire film series

Bloodthirsty (or The Bloodthirsty Trilogy) is a 1970s Japanese vampire film trilogy produced by Toho Studio, consisting of three of their 1970s horror films: The Vampire Doll, Lake of Dracula and Evil of Dracula. While there is no plot connection between the films, they share a vampire theme. The films were all directed by Michio Yamamoto and co-written by Ei Ogawa.

All three films have been released on Blu-Ray in a box set from Arrow Video. This release included uncompressed mono audio, Toho's export English dubs for Lake of Dracula and Evil of Dracula, a video appraisal by Kim Newman, original trailers, and a collector's booklet in the first pressing.

== List of films ==
- The Vampire Doll (1970) - released in Japan as Chi o Suu Ningyo (translation: The Bloodthirsty Doll), aka Legacy of Dracula
- Lake of Dracula (1971) - released in Japan as Chi o Suu Me (translation: Bloodthirsty Eyes)
- Evil of Dracula (1974) - released in Japan as Chi o Suu Bara (translation: The Bloodthirsty Rose)
