= The Vampire Doll =

- Theatrical release poster
- Directed by: Michio Yamamoto
- Screenplay by: Ei Ogawa; Hiroshi Nagano
- Produced by: Tomoyuki Tanaka; Fumio Tanaka
- Starring: Kayo Matsuo; Yukiko Kobayashi; Yoko Minazake
- Cinematography: Kazutomi Hara
- Music by: Riichiro Manabe
- Production company: Toho
- Distributed by: Toho
- Release date: June 4, 1970 (Japan)
- Running time: 71 minutes
- Country: Japan
- Language: Japanese

The Vampire Doll (Japanese: 幽霊屋敷の恐怖 血を吸う人形, Hepburn: Yuurei yashiki no kyoufu - Chi o suu ningyo) is a 1970 Japanese horror film directed by Michio Yamamoto.

== Plot ==
Returning to Tokyo from a six-month business trip overseas, Kazuhiko leaves to visit his girlfriend Yuko at her isolated country home. After a week when nothing is heard from him, his sister Keiko and her fiancé Hiroshi go to find him. Yuko's mother Shizu tells them that he left after being told that Yuko had died when a landslide struck her car two weeks before he arrived. Keiko suspects there is more to the story. She and Hiroshi stay and try to trace her brother's last steps and end up uncovering tragic and horrifying secrets about Shizu and Yuko.

== Cast ==
- Yukiko Kobayashi as Yuko Nonomura
- Yoko Minazake as Shizu Nonomura, Yuko's mother
- Atsuo Nakamura as Kazuhiko Sagawa, Yuko's fiancé
- Kayo Matsuo as Keiko Sagawa
- Akira Nakao as Hiroshi Takagi, Keiko's fiancé
- Jun Usami as Dr. Yamaguchi
- Sachio Sakai as Taxi driver
- Kaku Takashina as Genzo

== Production ==
The Vampire Doll was the first of three vampire films made by Toho studios in the 1970s. The Vampire Doll was followed by Lake of Dracula (1971) and Evil of Dracula (1974).

== Release ==
The Vampire Doll was released in Japan on July 4, 1970. The film was released in an English-subtitled format in the United States under the title The Night of the Vampire on August 6, 1971. The release was limited only to Japanese theatres in New York and Los Angeles. The film has also gone under the title Legacy of Dracula.

=== Reception ===
The New York Times gave the film a positive review, stating that the director "tells his grisly story with a cool taciturn detachment. Don't be fooled by what seems a conventional staging. There is plenty lurking around the bend, some of it is hair-raising". The review also noted that the film was "exceptionally well-written, with a denouement that is fascinating and—well, almost credible. The acting is on a par with the rest".

=== Home media ===
In 2018, Arrow Films released The Vampire Doll, along with Lake of Dracula and Evil of Dracula, in a single Blu-ray set titled The Bloodthirsty Trilogy. This release included uncompressed mono audio, Toho's export English dubs for Lake of Dracula and Evil of Dracula, a video appraisal by Kim Newman, original trailers, and a collector's booklet in the first pressing. The Vampire Doll is in Japanese language / subtitled only.

== See also ==
- List of horror films of 1970
- List of Japanese films of 1970
