= Rainy Dog =

1997 Japanese film directed by Takashi Miike

- Theatrical release poster
- Directed by: Takashi Miike
- Written by: Seigo Inoue
- Produced by: Tetsuya Ikeda; Ken Takeuchi; Tsutomu Tsuchikawa; Toshiki Kimura; Chang Hwa-kun
- Starring: Show Aikawa; Tomorowo Taguchi; Gao Mingjun; Chen Xianmei
- Cinematography: Li Yi-hsu
- Edited by: Yasushi Shimamura
- Music by: Sound Kids
- Release date: 28 June 1997 (Japan)
- Running time: 95 minutes
- Country: Japan
- Languages: Japanese; Mandarin; Taiwanese Hokkien

Rainy Dog (Japanese: 極道黒社会, Hepburn: Gokudô kuroshakai) is a 1997 Japanese film directed by Takashi Miike, completely set and filmed in Taipei, Taiwan. Its main theme is the unlikely relationships formed between a hitman and his hooker girlfriend and his son.

This movie is the second part of the Black Society trilogy.

== Plot ==
Yujiro (Yuuji), is fired from his yakuza syndicate. He finds work with another boss as a pay-per-hit assassin, killing members of other syndicates. His life starts to become more complicated when an ex-girlfriend drops his son off at his house. His son, Ah-Chen, who is mute, begins to follow him, and the boy watches him shoot a man who is having lunch with his wife and infant son. Afterward, the boy follows Yuuji to a whorehouse where he waits outside. While waiting, he eats food from the garbage and befriends a puppy who is chained in the alley.

Lili, a prostitute, and Yuuji develop a live-in relationship, possibly by contract with her procurer. Things get more complicated when the brother of Yuuji's recent victim, a lawyer, approaches his brother's yakuza syndicate to request it to make a revenge attack on Yuuji. Circumstances revolving around one of his contract killings force the three of them to flee, taking temporary refuge on a beach. While there, Lili teaches Yuuji's son to read and write his name, 'Chen'. The lawyer discovers the relationship between Lili and Yuuji and augments her website to offer a reward for anyone with information about her. Yuuji, his son, and Lili are on the way out of town when Yuuji calls his new boss to get a passport.

Yuuji's new boss knows about the reward and calls the lawyer, despite it being he who hired Yuuji. Yuuji can tell by the sound of his boss's voice that he has been betrayed, so he leaves their current location and seek refuge at the apartment of one of Lili's friends, a trans woman named Sandy. While browsing on her friend's computer, Lili discovers the reward offered on her website, informs Yuuji and the two begin to wonder where Sandy has gone. They spot her outside, waiting nervously downstairs, and realize she has turned them in for the reward.

Yuuji sends Lili and his son together to a train station and gets revenge on his boss, but before they can make it there they are captured by the lawyer and Lili is killed. Yuuji faces off with the lawyer, but gets knocked out due to a distraction by Chen, after pumping a few bullets into the lawyer - which makes him appear dead. As Yuuji and Chen rejoice, an old acquaintance, a low quality and comical hitman, appears and kills Yuuji. After the hitman leaves, the lawyer reawakens and gives Chen a short speech, telling him if he wants to seek revenge in the future, then he will be waiting.

== Cast ==
Actor	Role
Show Aikawa	Yuuji
Sau Leung "Blacky" Ko	Whorehouse Proprietor
Xianmei Chen	Lili
Chang Shih	
Jianqin He	Chen
Tomorowo Taguchi	The Pursuer

== Release ==
The film was released on 28 June 1997. Arrow Video released the film on Blu-ray on 24 January 2017.

== Reception ==
Sight & Sound described the film as a "relatively subdued effort" from Miike, whose plot was "Stretched somewhat thin over 95 minutes". The review noted "moments of melancholy lyricism, but Miike is rigorously unsentimental in his approach to the father/son relationship - which barely figures until the closing scenes."
