= Sharksploitation =

Subgenre of exploitation film

Sharksploitation is a subgenre of exploitation film that involves sharks or shark attacks. The genre emerged in the wake of the 1975 film Jaws and its sequels, but fell in popularity soon after. The 1999 film Deep Blue Sea brought it back to public prominence. Other examples of sharksploitation films include Mega Shark Versus Giant Octopus (2009), Dinoshark, Sharktopus (both 2010), Snow Shark (2012), Ghost Shark (2013), Avalanche Sharks (2014), and the Sharknado film series (2013–2018).

In 2023, a feature-length documentary film about the subgenre, titled Sharksploitation, was produced and released by Shudder.

== Notable sharksploitation films ==
Year	Films	Series	Genre
1950	Killer Shark	NA	Adventure
1960	Shark!	N/A	Action
1975	Jaws	Jaws	Thriller
1975	Sharks' Treasure	N/A	Adventure
1976	Mako: The Jaws of Death	N/A	Thriller
1976	Shark Kill	N/A	Adventure
1977	Tintorera, also known as Tintorera: Killer Shark.	N/A	Horror
1978	Jaws 2	Jaws	Thriller
1978	Cyclone (Spanish: El Ciclón), also known as Terror Storm	N/A	Survival/Horror
1979	The Shark Hunter	N/A	Adventure
1981	The Last Shark, also known as Great White	N/A	Horror
1981	Beyond the Reef	N/A	Adventure
1983	Jaws 3-D	Jaws	Thriller
1987	Jaws: The Revenge	Jaws	Thriller
1989	Night of the Sharks	N/A	Action
1989	Deep Blood, also known as Sharks or Sangue negli abissi (Italian, lit. "Blood in the Abyss")	N/A	Adventure/Horror
1995	Cruel Jaws	N/A	Thriller
1999	Deep Blue Sea	Deep Blue Sea	Sci-fi/Horror
1999	Shark Attack	Shark Attack	Thriller
2000	Shark Attack 2	Shark Attack	Thriller
2002	Shark Attack 3: Megalodon	Shark Attack	Thriller
2003	Open Water (Note: Open Water 2: Adrift has been excluded from this list. Although it is nominally part of the Open Water franchise, it is thematically unrelated to either Open Water or Open Water 3: Cage Dive.)	Open Water	Survival/Thriller
2003	Red Water	N/A	Action/Horror
2003	Shark Zone	N/A	Horror
2004	12 Days of Terror	N/A	Horror/Thriller
2004	Blue Demon	N/A	Sci-fi/Horror
2005	Hammerhead: Shark Frenzy, also known as Sharkman or Hammerhead	N/A	Sci-fi/Action/Horror
2005	Raging Sharks	N/A	Sci-fi/Action/Horror
2005	Spring Break Shark Attack	N/A	Action/Adventure/Drama
2008	Shark Swarm, also known as Great White	N/A	Thriller
2008	Shark in Venice, also known as Sharks in Venice in the U.S.	N/A	Natural horror/Action
2009	Jaws in Japan, also known as Psycho Shark	N/A (unrelated to the Jaws franchise)	Horror
2009	Malibu Shark Attack, also known as Mega Shark of Malibu	It is a part of the SyFy Channel's Maneater series (which is unrelated to the Shark Attack or Mega Shark franchises), along with Shark Swarm, Shark Killer, and 25 other natural horror creature features.	Natural horror
2009	Mega Shark Versus Giant Octopus	Mega Shark Versus	Creature feature
2010	Dinoshark	N/A	Horror/Comedy
2010	Mega Shark Versus Crocosaurus	Mega Shark Versus	Creature feature
2010	The Reef	The Reef	Thriller
2010	Sharktopus	Sharktopus	Horror/Sci-fi/Creature feature/Comedy
2011	Sand Sharks	N/A	Horror/Comedy
2011	Shark Night	N/A	Thriller
2011	Super Shark	N/A	Sci-fi/Action
2011	Swamp Shark	N/A	Thriller
2012	2-Headed Shark Attack	Multi-Headed Shark Attack	Survival horror
2012	Bait 3D	N/A	Horror/Disaster
2012	Dark Tide	N/A	Action/Horror/Thriller
2012	Jersey Shore Shark Attack	N/A	Horror/Comedy
2012	Jurassic Shark, also known as Attack of the Jurassic Shark	Jurassic Shark	Horror/Comedy
2012	Snow Shark: Ancient Snow Beast	Snow Shark	Horror/Comedy
2012	Ghost Shark	Ghost Shark	Horror/Comedy
2013	Sharknado	Sharknado	Sci-fi/Disaster
2014	Avalanche Sharks	N/A	Horror/Comedy
2014	Mega Shark Versus Mecha Shark	Mega Shark Versus	Horror/Comedy
2014	Sharknado 2: The Second One	Sharknado	Sci-fi/Disaster/Comedy
2014	Sharktopus vs. Pteracuda	Sharktopus	Horror/Sci-fi/Creature feature/Comedy
2014	Piranha Sharks	N/A	Comedy/Horror
2015	Sharktopus vs. Whalewolf	Sharktopus	Horror/Sci-fi/Creature feature/Comedy
2015	Shark Exorcist	Shark Exorcist	Action/Horror
2015	3-Headed Shark Attack	Multi-Headed Shark Attack	Action/Horror
2015	Ghost Shark 2: Urban Jaws	Ghost Shark	Supernatural/Horror/Comedy
2015	Mega Shark Versus Kolossus	Mega Shark Versus	Sci-fi/Comedy
2015	Sharknado 3: Oh Hell No!	Sharknado	Action/Horror/Comedy
2015	Roboshark, also known as Robo Shark vs. Navy Seals	N/A	Action/Adventure/Comedy
2015	Shark Lake (film)	N/A	Action/Horror
2016	Atomic Shark	N/A	Action/Horror
2016	Ozark Sharks, also known as Summer Shark Attack	N/A	Horror/Thriller/Comedy
2016	The Shallows	N/A	Survival/Horror
2016	Sharkansas Women's Prison Massacre	N/A	Sci-fi/Horror
2016	Sharkenstein	N/A	Sci-fi/Action/Comedy
2016	Sharknado: The 4th Awakens	Sharknado	Sci-fi/Disaster/Comedy
2017	5-Headed Shark Attack	Multi-Headed Shark Attack	Sci-fi/Horror
2017	47 Meters Down	47 Meters Down	Survival/Horror
2017	House Shark	N/A	Horror/Comedy
2017	Open Water 3: Cage Dive	Open Water	Found footage/Survival/Horror
2017	Sharknado 5: Global Swarming	Sharknado	Sci-fi/Disaster/Comedy
2018	The Last Sharknado: It's About Time	Sharknado	Sci-fi/Disaster/Comedy
2018	Deep Blue Sea 2	Deep Blue Sea	Sci-fi/Horror
2018	The Meg	The Meg	Sci-fi/Action
2019	47 Meters Down: Uncaged	47 Meters Down	Survival/Horror
2019	Capsized: Blood in the Water	N/A	Survival/Horror
2020	Deep Blue Sea 3	Deep Blue Sea	Sci-fi/Horror
2020	Sky Sharks	N/A	Sci-fi/Comedy/Horror
2020	Ouija Shark	Ouija Shark	Comedy/Horror/Action
2021	Great White	N/A	Survival/Horror
2021	Sharks of the Corn	N/A	Horror
2021	Swim (film)	N/A	Horror/Action
2022	Ouija Shark 2	Ouija Shark	Action/Horror/Comedy
2022	The Reef: Stalked	The Reef	Horror
2022	The Requin	N/A	Horror/Thriller
2022	Maneater (Shark film)	N/A	Action/Horror
2022	Shark Bait	N/A	Action/Horror
2023	Sharktopus Remade in China	Sharktopus	Horror/Sci-fi/Creature feature/Comedy
2023	Meg 2: The Trench	The Meg	Sci-Fi/Action
2023	Cocaine Shark, also known as Kanizame Shakurabu (Note: Cocaine Shark features character and geographical connections to both the Jurassic Shark franchise and the film Sharkenstein, but it is thematically unrelated to either film.)	N/A	Crime/Drama/Horror
2023	Big Shark	N/A	Horror/Comedy
2024	Under Paris	N/A	Action/Horror
2024	The Black Demon	N/A	Sci-Fi/Thriller
2024	No Way Up	N/A	Survival/Thriller
2024	Shark Exorcist 2: Unholy Waters	Shark Exorcist	Action/Horror
2024	Shark Island (film)	N/A	Action/Horror
2024	Something in the Water	N/A	Survival/Thriller
2025	Fear Below	N/A	Action/Thriller
2025	Into the Deep	N/A	Action/Thriller
2025	Dangerous Animals	N/A	Action/Thriller
2026	Deep Water	N/A	Survival/Horror
2026	The Devil's Mouth	N/A	Survival/Thriller
2026	Above & Below	N/A	Action/Horror/Thriller

== See also ==
- Exploitation film
- Great white shark
