= Open Water =

Open water may refer to:

- Ice-free openings on a body of water which otherwise has a frozen surface:
  - Lead (sea ice), a large fracture within an expanse of sea ice
  - Polynya, an area of open water surrounded by sea ice
- Open water (diving), unconfined underwater diving environment, generally with no constraint to a direct vertical ascent to a free surface in contact with the atmosphere.

== Arts and entertainment ==
- Open Water (album), a 2006 album by the German singer Sascha Schmitz
- "Open Water", a song by King Gizzard & the Lizard Wizard from Flying Microtonal Banana
- Open Water (film series), consisting of survival horror-thriller movies centered around individuals stranded in the ocean and susceptible to attacks by sharks.
  - Open Water (film), a 2003 film about a couple that were accidentally left behind by their scuba diving group.
  - Open Water 2: Adrift, a 2006 film about a group of friends who become stranded in the open sea without a means to escape.
  - Open Water 3: Cage Dive, a 2017 film about a group who find themselves stranded in the ocean
- Open Water (novel), a 2021 novel by Caleb Azumah Nelson
- Open Waters (The Morning Show), an episode of the American television series The Morning Show

== Sporting ==
- Open-water diving, underwater diving in a place without artificial boundaries with a directly accessible surface.
  - Open Water Diver, an entry level scuba-diving certification provided by several training agencies
- Open water jump, an obstacle found in the equestrian sport of show jumping
- Open water swimming, an activity in which people swim in large, outdoor bodies of water such as oceans, bays, lakes and rivers

== Other ==
- Open Water, the retail market for water supply and sanitation services for businesses in England
