= Open Water (film series) =

Survival horror film series

- Official film series logo
- Based on: loosely on a true story
- Distributed by: Warner Bros. Entertainment
- Countries: United States; Australia
- Language: English
- Budget: ~$2,068,100 (total of 3 films)
- Box office: $64,001,222 (total of 3 films)

Open Water is a survival horror film series, inspired by the real-life disappearance of Tom and Eileen Lonergan. The overall plot centers around individuals who are stranded in the ocean and must fight to survive the hours alone.

Initially developed as minimalist oceanic survival films, Lionsgate expanded upon the individual scripts to create the series of films. The first film was a massive financial and critical success, with film critics praising its minimalistic filmmaking. Though developed as a drama fictionalized adaptation of the disappearance of the Lonergans, the studio marketed the movie with horror genre tactics; something that modern analysis attributes to some of its success, with some calling Open Water "the most terrifying shark movie ever made", and "the scariest horror movie based on a true story". The sequels were met with mixed-at-best and poor respective critical reception, while both fared well overall financially.

== Films ==
Film	U.S. release date	Director	Screenwriter(s)	Story by	Producer(s)
Open Water	August 6, 2004	Chris Kentis	Chris Kentis	Chris Kentis	Laura Lau
Open Water 2: Adrift	February 20, 2007	Hans Horn	Adam Kreutner & David Mitchell and Collin McMahon & Richard Speight, Jr.		Dan Maag and Philip Schulz-Deyle
Open Water 3: Cage Dive	August 11, 2017	Gerald Rascionato	Gerald Rascionato	Gerald Rascionato & Stephen Lister	Charles M. Barsamian, Rana Joy Glickman, Jake Gray, Antoine Mouawad and Gerald Rascionato

=== Open Water (2004) ===
Daniel and Susan take a tropical vacation, which includes scuba-diving adventures. Excited for their diving certifications, the pair dive deeper than the rest of their group and get separated. Following an incorrect head-count and believing the entire class is accounted for, the boat returns to land. When the couple resurfaces, they see a vessel in the distance and decide to wait for its return. As time passes, and stranded miles from shore with Caribbean reef sharks stalking them below, the likelihood of their survival grows smaller by the moment.

=== Open Water 2: Adrift (2007) ===
Amy and James, with their baby Sarah, travel to Mexico to celebrate their friend Zach's thirtieth birthday. Upon arriving, they're reunited with common friends, Zach, Lauren, and Dan. Together they set sail on Dan's new yacht, where they're introduced to his new girlfriend named Michelle. The group party, drinking alcohol while they reminisce. When they stop for a swim, Amy stays in the boat with her baby and no intention to join the rest, due to a childhood traumatic event in the ocean. Dan keeps her company for a time, before he picks her up and throws her into the water below. Irresponsibly, he falls overboard as well. Once everyone is in the water, it's realized that no one lowered the ladder while they were on deck. Following hours of struggling and failing to climb the freeboard, Michelle claims that she saw sharks in the water and unsettling exhaustion overtakes the group. Stranded in the open waters of the Pacific Ocean, panic and desperation leads to a tragic fight for survival; while Amy must use her motherly instincts to return to her daughter, to overcome her fears. As time passes, their chances of survival lessen.

=== Open Water 3: Cage Dive (2017) ===
Determined to experience adrenaline-filled thrills of coming face-to-face with great white sharks, three friends from California travel to Australia for a cage-diving encounter. Josh, together with his half-brother Jeff and Jeff's girlfriend Megan, set out to film an audition tape for an extreme stunts reality-TV show. Tensions arise when Jeff discovers that Josh and Megan are having an affair. Things take a despairing turn while they are in the safety of the shark-proof cage, when a rogue wave capsizes their boat leaving the trio stranded in the open water of the sea. As the day turns to night, hysteric fear overtakes them as a swarm of hungry sharks hunt them from below. As the predators close in on them, the friends do all they can to survive until morning.

== Main cast and characters ==
List indicators

This section includes characters who will appear or have appeared in the franchise in main roles.

- An empty grey cell indicates the character was not in the film, or that the character's official presence has not yet been confirmed.
- ^{Y} indicates a younger version of the character.

Character	Films		
Character	Open Water	Open Water 2: Adrift	Open Water 3: Cage Dive
Character	2003/2004	2007	2017
Susan Watkins	Blanchard Ryan		
Daniel Kintner	Daniel Travis		
Amy		Susan May Pratt Alexandra Raach^{Y}	
James		Richard Speight, Jr.	
Dan		Eric Dane	
Michelle		Cameron Richardson	
Zach		Niklaus Lange	
Lauren		Ali Hillis	
Sarah		Mattea Gabarretta & Christine Gabarratta	
Jeff Miller			Joel Hogan
Josh Miller			Josh Potthoff
Megan Murphy			Megan Peta Hill

== Additional crew and production details ==
Film	Crew/Detail					
Film	Composer(s)	Cinematographer(s)	Editor(s)	Production companies	Distributing company	Running time
Open Water	Graeme Revell	Chris Kentis & Laura Lau	Chris Kentis	Lions Gate Films, Plunge Pictures LLC, Eastgate Pictures	Lions Gate Films	89 minutes
Open Water 2: Adrift	Gerd Baumann	Bernhard Jasper	Christian Lonk	Summit Entertainment, Universum Film, Orange Pictures, Peter Rommel Productions, Shotgun Pictures, FilmFernsehFonds Bayern	Lions Gate Entertainment	94 minutes
Open Water 3: Cage Dive	Andy Grush & Taylor Newton Stewart	Gerald Tascionato & Andy Bambach	Gerald Rascionato, Antoine Mouawad & Andre Stamatakakos	Lionsgate Home Entertainment, Just One More Productions, Exit Strategy Productions	Lionsgate	80 minutes

== Reception ==
=== Box office and financial performance ===
Film	Box office gross			Box office ranking		Video sales gross	Worldwide gross total	Budget	Ref.
Film	North America	Other territories	Worldwide	All-time North America	All-time worldwide	North America	Worldwide gross total	Budget	Ref.
Open Water	$30,610,863	$25,017,759	$55,628,622	#2,786	#2,783	Information not publicly available	>$55,628,622	$500,000	
Open Water 2: Adrift	—N/a	$6,816,129	$6,816,129	Information not publicly available	Information not publicly available	Information not publicly available	>6,816,129	~$1,448,100	
Open Water 3: Cage Dive	—N/a	$1,486,774	$1,486,774	#8,434	#12,696	$69,697	$1,556,471	$120,000	
Totals	$30,610,863	$33,320,662	$63,931,525	#3,740	#5,160	$69,697	>$64,001,222	~$2,068,100	

=== Critical and public response ===
Film	Rotten Tomatoes	Metacritic
Open Water	71% (196 reviews)	63/100 (38 reviews)
Open Water 2: Adrift	45% (11 reviews)	—N/a
Open Water 3: Cage Dive	25% (8 reviews)	TBD
