= LD Entertainment =

Independent American film studio

LD Entertainment, LLC
- Formerly: Liddell Entertainment (2007–2011)
- Type: Private
- Industry: Film
- Founded: 2007; 19 years ago
- Founder: Mickey Liddell
- Headquarters: Los Angeles, United States
- Key people: Mickey Liddell (Chairman & CEO)
- Products: Motion pictures
- Website: www.ldentertainment.com

LD Entertainment, LLC (formerly known as Liddell Entertainment) is an independent American film studio and sales company, founded in 2007 by Mickey Liddell. The company is headquartered in Los Angeles, California and run by Liddell, who formerly worked with Greg Berlanti at Berlanti/Liddell Productions (now Berlanti Productions).

== Filmography ==
| Year | Film | Director | Budget | Worldwide gross | Notes |
|---|---|---|---|---|---|
| 2008 | The Haunting of Molly Hartley | Mickey Liddell | $5 million | $15.4 million | |
| 2009 | Good Hair | Jeff Stilson | —N/a | $4.2 million | |
| 2009 | The Collector | Marcus Dunstan | $3 million | $10.2 million | |
| 2009 | I Love You Phillip Morris | John Requa and Glenn Ficarra | $13 million | $20.8 million | |
| 2010 | Biutiful | Alejandro González Iñárritu | $35 million | $25.1 million | |
| 2011 | Albert Nobbs | Rodrigo García | $7.5 million | $8.5 million | Nominated: Academy Award for Best Actress (Glenn Close); Academy Award for Best Supporting Actress (Janet McTeer); Academy Award for Best Makeup and Hairstyling |
| 2011 | Silent House | Chris Kentis and Laura Lau | $2 million | $16.5 million | |
| 2011 | The Grey | Joe Carnahan | $25 million | $79.8 million | |
| 2011 | Killer Joe | William Friedkin | $10 million | $4.6 million | |
| 2011 | The Details | Jacob Aaron Estes | —N/a | $63,595 | |
| 2012 | The Collection | Marcus Dunstan | $10 million | $9.9 million | |
| 2012 | Disconnect | Henry-Alex Rubin | $10 million | $3.4 million | |
| 2012 | Black Rock | Katie Aselton | —N/a | $175,682 | |
| 2013 | In Secret | Charlie Stratton | —N/a | $652,228 | |
| 2014 | The Devil's Hand | Christian E. Christiansen | $7 million | $1.4 million | |
| 2016 | Risen | Kevin Reynolds | $20 million | $46.4 million | |
| 2016 | Anthropoid | Sean Ellis | $9 million | $5.1 million | |
| 2016 | Jackie | Pablo Larraín | $9 million | $36.6 million | Nominated: Academy Award for Best Actress (Natalie Portman); Academy Award for Best Original Score; Academy Award for Best Costume Design |
| 2017 | The Zookeeper's Wife | Niki Caro | $20 million | $26.2 million | |
| 2017 | Megan Leavey | Gabriela Cowperthwaite | —N/a | $14.5 million | |
| 2018 | Forever My Girl | Bethany Ashton Wolf | $3.5 million | $16.4 million | |
| 2018 | I Can Only Imagine | Andrew and Jon Erwin | $7 million | $86.1 million | |
| 2018 | The Miracle Season | Sean McNamara | —N/a | $10.2 million | |
| 2018 | Dog Days | Ken Marino | $10 million | $6.8 million | |
| 2018 | Ben Is Back | Peter Hedges | $13 million | $12.6 million | |
| 2018 | Teen Spirit | Max Minghella | —N/a | $1.6 million | |
| 2018 | Fast Color | Julia Hart | —N/a | $76,916 | |
| 2018 | The Biggest Little Farm | John Chester | —N/a | $6.5 million | |
| 2019 | Jacob's Ladder | David M. Rosenthal | —N/a | —N/a | Released on DISH Network |
| 2019 | Judy | Rupert Goold | $10 million | $45.5 million | Academy Award for Best Actress (Renée Zellweger); Nominated: Academy Award for Best Makeup and Hairstyling |
| 2019 | Big Time Adolescence | Jason Orley | —N/a | —N/a | Released on Hulu |
| 2020 | Looks That Kill | Kellen Moore | —N/a | —N/a | Released digitally |
| 2020 | The Sleepover | Trish Sie | —N/a | —N/a | Released on Netflix |
| 2020 | Words on Bathroom Walls | Thor Freudenthal | $9.3 million | $3.2 million | |
| 2020 | The Binge | Jeremy Garelick | —N/a | —N/a | Released on Hulu |
| 2020 | The Glorias | Julie Taymor | $20 million | $30,940 | |
| 2021 | The Ultimate Playlist of Noise | Bennett Lasseter | —N/a | —N/a | Released on Hulu |
| 2021 | Plan B | Natalie Morales | —N/a | —N/a | |
| 2021 | Introducing, Selma Blair | Rachel Fleit | —N/a | $5,700 | |
| 2021 | The Cursed | Sean Ellis | —N/a | $4.6 million | |
| 2022 | Crush | Sammi Cohen | —N/a | —N/a | Released on Hulu |
| 2022 | The Binge 2: It's A Wonderful Binge | Paul Scheer | —N/a | —N/a | Released on Hulu |
| 2023 | I.S.S. | Gabriela Cowperthwaite | $13.8 million | $6.6 million | |
| 2024 | Prom Dates | Kim Nguyen | —N/a | —N/a | Released on Hulu |
| 2025 | Kiss of the Spider Woman | Bill Condon | $30 million | $1.7 million | |
| 2025 | Dangerous Animals | Sean Byrne | $2 million | $9.2 million | |
| 2025 | Bone Lake | Mercedes Bryce Morgan | —N/a | $1.4 million | |
| 2026 | Pizza Movie | Brian McElhaney and Nick Kocher | —N/a | —N/a | Released on Hulu |
| 2026 | The Last Guest of the Holloway Motel | Ramiel Petros and Nicholas Freeman | | | |
| 2026 | A Talent for Murder | Anton Corbijn | —N/a | —N/a | |
| 2026 | Hadestown | Rachel Chavkin | —N/a | —N/a | |
| 2027 | Elsinore | Simon Stone | —N/a | —N/a | |
