= St. Crispin's Reef =

Part of the Great Barrier Reef, Queensland, Australia

Coordinates: 16°07′54.14″S 145°48′22.46″E

St. Crispin's Reef is an elongate outer-shelf coral reef in the Great Barrier Reef, Queensland, Australia.

== Location and topography ==
Named after St. Crispin, the French patron saint of cobblers and tanners, St. Crispin's Reef is located 35 miles off the Queensland coast in the Coral Sea, in latitude 16° 07' 54.14" S longitude 145° 48' 22.46" E, at a depth of 9 metres. It lies east of Undine Reef and south of Agincourt Reefs, close to Opal Reef. Protected by neighbor reefs, St. Crispin's structure consists of many shallow sandy channels that reticulate around coral mounds, rather than a typical reef slope. It has an abundance of soft corals and colourful marine life.

== Marine life ==
St. Crispin's Reef is a popular diving and snorkeling spot for expeditions from Port Douglas and Cairns. Nicknamed "Flower garden", the reef is host to Sergeant majors, Sweet lips, reef sharks, feather stars and bumphead parrot fish.

== Classification ==
Classified by the Marine Park Authority for "Intensive use", the reef has four moorings. In 1998, divers Tom and Eileen Lonergan were accidentally left here by their dive expedition, and went missing. Their bodies were never found. The tragedy inspired the film Open Water.
