= Tom Lonergan =

Tom Lonergan may refer to:

- Tom and Eileen Lonergan, divers
- Tom Lonergan (footballer) (born 1984), Australian rules footballer with the Geelong Football Club
- Tommy Lonergan (born 2004), Irish association footballer
