= Siya Mayola =

South African actor (born 1988)

- Born: Siyabonga Ricky Mayola; 10 May 1988 (age 38); Port Elizabeth, South Africa
- Education: AFDA, The School for the Creative Economy
- Occupation: Actor
- Years active: 2010–present
- Website: siyamayola.com

Siyabonga Ricky Mayola (born 10 May 1988) is a South African actor and model. He is best known for his roles in the series Amaza, Projek Dina, Die Spreeus and Sara se Geheim.

== Personal life ==
Mayola was born in Port Elizabeth, South Africa. His father was a teacher and mother was a nurse. He completed primary education at Victoria Park Grey and Sundridge Park Primary. Then he matriculated from Alexander Road High School. He took classes at the Stage World Theatre School in Port Elizabeth and performed in the local plays. He completed his degree at AFDA, The School for the Creative Economy.

== Career ==
In 2011, he made his film debut as Baby Face in the Hollywood indie film 419 filmed in Cape Town. Then in 2012, he was cast in the stage play Faces Of Betrayal co-directed by Dr. Christopher John and Caroline Duck. In 2012, he appeared in the short film The Brave Unseen, for which he won the award for Best Supporting Actor at the annual AFDA awards. After the short, he shot the documentary Antartica for two and a half months. After his return in 2014, he joined the SABC1 youth drama series Amaza in the role of Bongani Mapanga. In 2016, he played Isaac in the Mzansi Magic drama Isikizi.

Then in 2018, he joined the second season of kykNET drama Sara se Geheim as Nyaniso. In 2019, he played Victor in the kykNET police procedural series Die Spreeus. In 2020, he appeared in another kykNET police procedural series Projek Dina as Constable Conjwa. That same year, he appeared in John Pogue's Hollywood sci-fi film Deep Blue Sea 3. Then he played Willy in the 2020 Fugard Theatre production of Master Harold produced by Athol Fugard.

Apart from local television, he had a supporting role in the series Rugby Motors and Black Sails (2013). He also appeared in theatre productions such as Chance Musical, Passport to Tele Land, Beyond All Reason, Sofia is Gone and Faces of Betrayal.

== Filmography ==
Year	Film	Role	Genre	Ref.
2012	419	Babyface	TV series	
2012	The Brave Unseen	Vuyo	TV series	
2014	Amaza	Bongani Mapanga	TV series	
2014	Black Sails	Slave	TV series	
2015	Wallander	Second Assassin	TV series	
2016	Jabu's Jungle	Anteater	TV series	
2016	Shepherds and Butchers	Condemned Man	TV series	
2016	Isikizi	Isaac	TV series	
2018	Sara se Geheim	Nyaniso	TV series	
2018	Ice	Vendor	TV series	
2019	Die Spreeus	Victor	TV series	
2019	Poppie Nongena	du Preez	TV series	
2019	Moffie	Tracker	TV series	
2019	The Devil Speaks	Ken Rogers	TV series	
2020	Fried Barry	Hensley	TV series	
2020	Projek Dina	Constable Conjwa	TV series	
2020	Deep Blue Sea 3	Bahari	Film	
