= Sharksploitation (film) =

2023 American documentary film

- Promotional release poster
- Directed by: Stephen Scarlata
- Written by: Stephen Scarlata
- Produced by: Stephen Scarlata; Kerry Deignan Roy; Josh Miller
- Production company: Shudder
- Distributed by: Shudder
- Release date: July 21, 2023
- Running time: 106 minutes
- Country: United States
- Language: English

Sharksploitation is a 2023 American documentary film written and directed by Stephen Scarlata, who also produced the film alongside Kerry Deignan Roy and Josh Miller. The documentary examines the sharksploitation film subgenre, which centers around sharks and shark attacks.

Sharksploitation is produced by Shudder, and was made available for streaming on Shudder on July 21, 2023.
