= I Hate My Teenage Daughter =

American sitcom

- Genre: Sitcom
- Created by: Sherry Bilsing-Graham; Ellen Kreamer
- Starring: Jaime Pressly; Katie Finneran; Kevin Rahm; Chad L. Coleman; Eric Sheffer Stevens; Aisha Dee; Kristi Lauren
- Composer: Matter Music
- Country of origin: United States
- Original language: English
- No. of seasons: 1
- No. of episodes: 13 (6 unaired in the U.S.)

Production
- Executive producers: Sherry Bilsing-Graham; Ellen Kreamer
- Camera setup: Multi-camera
- Running time: 22 minutes
- Production companies: Gavin&Roxie&Hap Productions; Bonanza Productions; Warner Bros. Television

Original release
- Network: Fox
- Release: November 30, 2011 – March 20, 2012

I Hate My Teenage Daughter is an American sitcom that ran on Fox from November 30, 2011, to March 20, 2012. It aired at the 9:30 pm (E/P)/8:30 pm (C) timeslot after The X Factor. The series stars Jaime Pressly and Katie Finneran. On May 10, 2012, Fox canceled the series. The six remaining episodes subsequently aired in Australia and New Zealand.

== Synopsis ==
The series followed two mothers who fear their daughters are turning into the kind of girls who tormented them in high school. Annie Watson (Jaime Pressly), who grew up in a strict, conservative family, begins to notice that she has allowed her daughter Sophie (Kristi Lauren) to do whatever she wants; as a result, Sophie is a spoiled brat who frequently embarrasses and mocks her mother. Annie's best friend Nikki Miller (Katie Finneran), who grew up unpopular and overweight and has reinvented herself as a Southern Belle, begins to notice how manipulative her daughter Mackenzie (Aisha Dee) has become. Even the ex-husbands are not very good fathers: Annie's ex Matt is too clueless, prompting his lawyer brother Jack (Kevin Rahm) to step in (and become an object of Annie's crush) while Nikki's ex Gary is letting their complicated relationship become more complicated in the parenting department. These situations are among the major challenges Annie and Nikki must face to keep the daughters from turning into the people they were afraid of when they were their daughters' age.

== Production and development ==
Fox announced on January 10, 2011, during the Television Critics Association press tour, that it had greenlighted the project from writers Sherry Bilsing and Ellen Kreamer after entertainment president Kevin Reilly noted that the network was not giving up on multi-camera comedy, and its first comedy pilot order would go to a traditional sitcom.

I Hate My Teenage Daughter was ordered to series status on May 10, 2011. On May 16, 2011, Fox announced that the series would air on Wednesday after The X Factor in the fall. The series premiered on Fox on Wednesday, November 30, 2011, at 9:30/8:30c.

Beginning March 6, Raising Hope started off Tuesday nights at 8/7c, followed by the return of I Hate My Teenage Daughter at 8:30/7:30c. New Girl stayed in its regular timeslot at 9/8c and Breaking In followed at 9:30/8:30c. On March 15, 2012, Fox announced it was pulling the show after its scheduled April 3 airing and would air the remaining four episodes during the summer. Fox had originally planned to finish off the show after 90-minute editions of American Idol beginning April 4, but then decided American Idol would continue in the two-hour format adopted when its eleventh season began on Wednesday nights on January 18, 2012. On March 21, Fox announced it was pulling the March 27 and April 3 airings and replacing the episodes with reruns of Raising Hope.

Fox had originally scheduled the remaining six episodes of the series to be burned off Sundays at 7 and 7:30. On May 1, however, Fox cancelled those plans. In January 2013, the unaired episodes began to air in international markets, with three episodes premiering on TV2 in New Zealand and another three on Nine in Australia.

== Cast ==
=== Main ===
- Jaime Pressly as Annie Watson
- Katie Finneran as Nikki Miller
- Aisha Dee as Mackenzie Miller, Nikki's daughter
- Kristi Lauren as Sophie Gutierrez, Annie's daughter
- Eric Sheffer Stevens as Matt Gutierrez, Annie's ex-husband and Sophie's father
- Chad L. Coleman as Gary Miller, Nikki's ex-husband and Mackenzie's father
- Kevin Rahm as Jack Gutierrez, Matt's brother

=== Recurring ===
- Wendi McLendon-Covey as Deanna Dunbar, the principal at Mackenzie and Sophie's high school and former classmate of Nikki's.
- Mark Consuelos as Alejandro "Alex" Castillo, a Spanish-language professor at Annie and Nikki's community college.

== Episodes ==
No.	Title	Directed by	Written by	Original release date	Prod. code	U.S. viewers (millions)
1	"Pilot"	Andy Ackerman	Sherry Bilsing-Graham & Ellen Kreamer	November 30, 2011	296796	6.80
Nikki and Annie, two divorced single mothers, are forced to punish their rotten teenage daughters for locking a disabled boy in a bathroom by making them miss the school dance, which both had been looking forward to.
2	"Teenage Family Night"	Andy Ackerman	Wil Calhoun	December 7, 2011	2J6304	5.38
Annie brings back "Family Night", so everyone can spend time with each other. Nikki learns that Gary has a new girlfriend. Jack shows up with his attractive date.
3	"Teenage Cotillion"	Shelley Jensen	Josh Lieb	December 14, 2011	2J6305	5.06
After Matt realizes no one believes he is Sophie's father, he attempts to escort Sophie to her father-daughter dance. Jack tries to help by being on standby with a tuxedo and helping Matt pick up the pieces when he messes up. Meanwhile, Mackenzie relies on Gary to help her keep Nikki away from the dance floor and is horrified when Gary breaks down crying when he sees how much she has grown up.
4	"Teenage Dating"	Shelley Jensen	Allan Rice	December 21, 2011	2J6307	5.78
Annie allows Sophie to date an older boy, (Logan Miller) believing him to positively influence her, but has her suspicions when she finds out he has a son. Meanwhile, Mackenzie thanks Jack for helping her with schoolwork on the court system by giving him a full-fledged makeover.
5	"Teenage Escuela"	Steve Zuckerman	Laura Gutin Peterson	March 6, 2012	2J6308	3.74
Annie and Nikki take Spanish classes at the local community college to prove a point to Sophie and Mackenzie that grades are important. Annie has hard time in the class, while Nikki is getting along fine. Meanwhile, Matt and Gary are in charge of getting the girls to finish their school projects.
6	"Teenage Date Night"	Steve Zuckerman	Pete Holmes	March 13, 2012	2J6309	3.57
Annie goes on a date with Alex, her Spanish teacher from the community college. Jack begins to show his feelings for Annie.
7	"Teenage Vacation"	Steve Zuckerman	Kenya Barris	March 20, 2012	2J6310	2.92
Annie takes everyone on a trip for spring break, that she took when she was Sophie's age.
8	"Teenage Girlfriends"	David Trainer	Josh Lieb & Allan Rice	January 6, 2013 (NZ)	2J6311	N/A
Annie and Nikki befriend their archenemy.
9	"Teenage Sixties"	David Trainer	Wil Calhoun	January 13, 2013 (NZ)	2J6312	N/A
The mothers throw Sophie and Mackenzie a double birthday bash, but trouble abounds when the girls want a Mad Men party.
10	"Teenage Cheerleading"	Andy Ackerman	Rob DesHotel	January 16, 2013 (AU)	2J6303	N/A
Sophie and Mackenzie try out for the cheer squad, but when Sophie gets picked and Mackenzie doesn't, this causes friction between the friends and mothers. Meanwhile Matt and Gary need to cut the worst player from their basketball team, Jack.
11	"Teenage Party"	Andy Ackerman	Sherry Bilsing-Graham & Ellen Kreamer	January 9, 2013 (AU)	2J6302	N/A
Mackenzie and Sophie are invited to a seniors party but Annie has her concerns.
12	"Teenage Ski Trip"	Shelley Jensen	Kenya Barris	January 30, 2013 (AU)	2J6306	N/A
Sophie and Mackenzie are desperate to go on a school ski trip, but financial issues get in the way. Jack offers Sophie a job. Nikki tries to sell her old wedding ring from Gary, but finds out that it was a fake.
13	"Teenage Moving Out"	David Trainer	Sherry Bilsing-Graham & Ellen Kreamer	February 10, 2013 (NZ)	2J6313	N/A
Sophie gets tired of being controlled by Annie, so she moves in with her dad. Annie turns into a mess, but is comforted by Jack. Matt learns about parental responsibility.

== Reception ==
The premiere scored a 2.9 rating with adults 18–49, and 6.8 total million viewers. However, the second episode fell to a 2.1 rating among adults 18–49, and 5.38 million viewers. The third episode continued the decline, but the fourth bounced back, achieving the highest viewership since the premiere. The two-and-a-half-month break between the fourth and fifth episodes, however, did the series no favors; its ratings plummeted when it returned, leading to the decision by Fox to remove the show from the schedule. On Rotten Tomatoes, the series has an aggregate score of 10% based on 3 positive and 27 negative critic reviews. The website’s consensus reads: "I Hate My Teenage Daughter squanders its talented cast on unlikable, stereotypical characters and poor writing."
