= Michael Benaroya =

American film producer

- Born: February 23, 1981 (age 45); Seattle, Washington, U.S.
- Occupation: Film producer
- Known for: founder of Benaroya Pictures

Michael Benaroya (born February 23, 1981) is an American film producer. He is chief executive officer at Benaroya Pictures.

== Biography ==
Benaroya was born to a Jewish family on February 23, 1981, in Seattle, Washington, U.S. His grandfather was Jack Benaroya (1921–2012), a real estate developer and philanthropist. Benaroya graduated from Pomona College, where he received a B.A. in economics.

=== Career ===
He moved to Los Angeles, California, in 2006 to pursue a career in the film industry and founded Benaroya Pictures, a film finance and production company, where he serves as its CEO.

== Filmography ==
=== As a producer ===
- New York, I Love You (2009)
- The Romantics (2010)
- Margin Call (2011)
- Catch .44 (2011)
- The Words (2012)
- Lawless (2012)
- Kill Your Darlings (2013)
- Hateship, Loveship (2013)
- Felony (2013)
- Parts per Billion (2014)
- Cymbeline (2015)
- Queen of the Desert (2015)
- Idol's Eye (2015)
- Elvis & Nixon (2016)
- Cell (2016)
- Wake (2016) (cancelled)
- Salt and Fire (2016)
- Haunting on Fraternity Row (2018)
- Against the Clock (2018)
- “”The Informer”” (2019)
- “”Dangerous”” (2021)
