= Wake (cancelled film) =

- Directed by: John Pogue
- Written by: Christopher Borrelli
- Produced by: David Alpert; Tobin Armbrust; Michael Benaroya; Chris Cowles; Michael Mendelsohn
- Starring: Ben Kingsley; Piper Perabo; Cameron Monaghan; Ellen Burstyn; Brendan Bradley
- Production companies: Benaroya Pictures; Circle of Confusion; DMG Entertainment; Exclusive Media; WeatherVane Productions
- Country: United States
- Language: English

Wake is a cancelled American action thriller film written by Christopher Borrelli. The film had Ben Kingsley, Piper Perabo, Cameron Monaghan and Ellen Burstyn set to star. Filming began on February 16, 2015 in Cleveland, which halted on February 26 due to financial issues. It was then expected to resume production in 2–3 weeks, but it was postponed for an indefinite time after actor Bruce Willis and director John Pogue left the film due to financing and scheduling issues.

== Premise ==
Red Forrester returns to his childhood home on a remote island to his very family after years of being banished by his family.

== Cast ==
- Ben Kingsley
- Piper Perabo as Claire Forrester
- Cameron Monaghan
- Ellen Burstyn

== Production ==
The project was first announced by Deadline in December 2014 that John Pogue would direct the action film Wake based on the script by Christopher Borrelli, which Benaroya Pictures would produce along with Exclusive Media, DMG, and Circle of Confusion. On January 14, 2015, Bruce Willis was set to star for the lead role to play a sociopath Red Forrester, who returns to his childhood home on a remote island for his brother's wake. On February 6, Ben Kingsley also joined the cast of the film. On February 20, Piper Perabo was set to play the role of Claire Forrester, the dead man's widow who is also a Red's former lover. Cameron Monaghan and Ellen Burstyn would also be starring in the film.

=== Filming and cancellation ===
Principal photography began on February 16, 2015 in Cleveland, Ohio. The whole film was to be shot in Northeast Ohio and filming was intended to end on April 17, 2015. On February 26, 2015, Deadline revealed that the production on the film had shut down due to financial problems, and Benaroya Pictures confirmed that they were working quickly to get help to resume the principal photography in approximately 2–3 weeks. On April 2, 2015, it was confirmed that Willis and director Pogue had left the project due to financial and schedule issues, producer Avi Lerner was also circling to finance the film but didn't signed on.
