= Deep Blue Sea (1999 film) =

1999 film by Renny Harlin

- Theatrical release poster
- Directed by: Renny Harlin
- Written by: Duncan Kennedy; Donna Powers; Wayne Powers
- Produced by: Akiva Goldsman; Tony Ludwig; Alan Riche
- Starring: Saffron Burrows; Thomas Jane; LL Cool J; Jacqueline McKenzie; Michael Rapaport; Stellan Skarsgård; Samuel L. Jackson
- Cinematography: Stephen Windon
- Edited by: Derek Brechin; Dallas Puett; Kevin Stitt; Frank J. Urioste
- Music by: Trevor Rabin
- Production companies: Village Roadshow Pictures; Groucho II Film Partnership; Riche-Ludwig Productions
- Distributed by: Warner Bros.
- Release date: July 28, 1999
- Running time: 105 minutes
- Countries: United States; Mexico
- Language: English
- Budget: $60–82 million
- Box office: $165 million

Deep Blue Sea is a 1999 science fiction horror film directed by Renny Harlin and written by Duncan Kennedy, Donna Powers, and Wayne Powers. It stars Thomas Jane, Saffron Burrows, Samuel L. Jackson, Michael Rapaport and LL Cool J. The film follows a team of scientists in an isolated underwater facility who are researching the brains of mako sharks to help fight Alzheimer's, only for the sharks to go on a rampage after two of the scientists, Susan McAlester and Jim Whitlock, genetically enhance their intelligence in secret.

An international co-production between the United States and Mexico, Deep Blue Sea represented a test for Harlin, who had not made a commercially successful film since Cliffhanger (1993). The film was primarily shot at Fox Baja Studios in Rosarito, where the production team constructed sets above the large water tanks that had been built for James Cameron's Titanic (1997). Although the film features some shots of real sharks, most of the sharks were either animatronic or computer-generated. Trevor Rabin composed the score, while co-star LL Cool J contributed the songs "Deepest Bluest (Shark's Fin)" and "Say What" to the soundtrack.

Released by Warner Bros. on July 28, 1999, Deep Blue Sea received generally mixed reviews; some praised its suspense, pacing, and action sequences, but criticized its unoriginality and B-movie conventions. Retrospective reviews have evaluated the film much more positively. It grossed $165 million worldwide on a budget of $60–82 million. The film spawned a franchise of the same name, and was followed by the direct-to-video sequels Deep Blue Sea 2 (2018) and Deep Blue Sea 3 (2020).

== Plot ==
In a remote underwater facility, doctors Susan McAlester and Jim Whitlock conduct research on mako sharks to find a cure for Alzheimer's disease. They harvest a protein complex from the sharks' enlarged brain tissue to reactivate dormant human brain cells. After an escaped shark attacks a boat full of young adults, anxious financial backers send corporate executive Russell Franklin to investigate the safety of the facility.

Susan and Jim prove their research is working by testing a specific protein complex isolated from the brain tissue of their largest shark. Upon awakening in the laboratory, the shark bites off Jim's arm. Tower operator Brenda Kerns calls a rescue helicopter that flies through a tropical cyclone to evacuate Jim. As Jim is being airlifted on a stretcher, the cable jams, dropping him into the shark pen. The largest shark grabs the stretcher, which is still attached to the cable, and uses it to pull the helicopter into the tower. The resulting explosions kill Brenda and the helicopter pilots, severely damaging the facility.

Susan, Russell, shark wrangler Carter Blake, marine biologist Janice Higgins, and engineer Tom Scoggins witness the shark smash Jim's stretcher against the laboratory's main window, shattering it, drowning Jim, and flooding the facility. They go to the facility's wet porch, where they plan to take a submersible to the surface and escape the sharks. Susan confesses that she and Jim genetically engineered the sharks to increase their brain size because they were not naturally large enough to harvest sufficient amounts of the protein complex. By doing so, they broke protocol and made the sharks much smarter and deadlier.

In the flooded kitchen, cook Sherman "Preacher" Dudley hides in an oven from a shark that has eaten his pet parrot. While trying to break in, the shark accidentally causes a gas leak. Preacher sneaks away and kills the shark by using his lighter to ignite the gas that trigger an explosion. When the group reaches the wet porch, they discover the submersible is damaged and unusable. While delivering a monologue emphasizing the need for group unity, Russell is dragged into the pool by the largest shark and devoured. The remaining crew chooses to climb the elevator shaft, despite the risk of destabilizing the pool. As they climb, explosive tremors cause the ladder to break, and Janice loses her grip. Despite Carter's attempt to save her, a shark devours her.

The rest of the group moves on and encounters Preacher. Carter and Tom head to the flooded laboratory to activate a control panel that drains a stairway to the surface, while Susan goes to her quarters to retrieve her research materials. Carter and Tom reach the control panel, but the largest shark storms in, rips Tom apart, and destroys the controls. In her room, Susan encounters another shark and electrocutes it with a live power cable, accepting that she must destroy her research in the process. Carter, Susan, and Preacher regroup at a decompression chamber. They swim to the surface, using their oxygen tanks to bait the last shark into an attack. Upon reaching the surface, Preacher is grabbed by the shark and sustains a leg injury, but the shark releases him when he stabs it in the eye with his crucifix necklace. Carter realizes the sharks have been manipulating them into flooding the facility so they can ram through the surface fences and escape into the open ocean.

To keep the final shark from escaping, the trio plans to blow it up by shooting it with an explosive harpoon connected to a battery. Feeling guilty for causing their predicament, Susan acts as bait without telling the others, cutting her hand before diving into the water. She successfully distracts the shark with her blood but cannot climb out in time and is devoured, despite Carter's efforts to save her. Carter grabs onto the shark's dorsal fin as Preacher fires the harpoon, which accidentally pierces Carter's thigh and pins him to the animal. Carter nevertheless orders Preacher to connect the wire to the battery, managing to free himself mere seconds before the shark rams the fence and explodes in the distance. Carter resurfaces and swims to a floating platform to reunite with Preacher. Moments later, they watch a rescue boat approach the sinking facility.

== Cast ==
- Thomas Jane as Carter Blake
- Saffron Burrows as Dr. Susan McAlester
- LL Cool J as Sherman "Preacher" Dudley
- Jacqueline McKenzie as Janice "Jan" Higgins
- Michael Rapaport as Tom "Scoggs" Scoggins
- Stellan Skarsgård as Dr. Jim Whitlock
- Samuel L. Jackson as Russell Franklin
- Aida Turturro as Brenda Kerns
- Valente Rodriguez as Co-Pilot
- Eyal Podell as Boy
- Erinn Bartlett as Girl
- Ronny Cox as Executive (uncredited)
- Renny Harlin as Worker (uncredited)

== Production ==
=== Development ===
Deep Blue Sea was conceived by Australian screenwriter Duncan Kennedy after he witnessed a "horrific" shark attack on a beach near his home, causing a recurring nightmare in which he was "in a passageway with sharks that could read [his] mind". This motivated him to write a spec script, acknowledging the challenge of approaching a shark film without repeating Steven Spielberg's Jaws. Although Warner Bros. Pictures bought the script in late 1994, actual development on the project did not start until two years later. When Finnish director Renny Harlin was chosen to direct the film, Kennedy's screenplay (which had already been re-written by several writers at Warner Bros.) was presented to Donna Powers and Wayne Powers, who turned it into the film's final script. According to Wayne, "The movie became essentially what we wrote. The draft we were first presented by [Warner Bros.] was much more of a military espionage, high-tech action movie, grenade launchers, that kind of thing. We wanted our team to include more blue-collar types and not to have weapons to fight back, to play it more as a horror film."

In an August 2021 interview with Bloody Disgusting, Kennedy stated that when he initially researched the project, scientists "agreed to talk because [he] presented [the] sharks as man-made, unlike Jaws which demonized natural sharks". He revealed that the original title was Deep Red before he changed it to Deep Blue Sea. He described his own rewrites and those of many subsequent writers, emphasizing a "DBS team effort" and that "all of these writers made contributions that are identifiable in the final film". In terms of the final product, he stated that despite major changes, "development overall stuck within the basic story framework seen in [his] original drafts" and that the final film is "very different on multiple levels [but] also in a more generalized sense... not that different". He confirmed that the development timeline of the project "was in fact under three years, [which is] nothing in Hollywood development time" with the original screenplay selling in late July 1995 and production commencing in early August 1998 for a July 1999 release date. He revealed that as production approached, he "helped to brainstorm ideas for sequences that weren't working" and that the film's producer Akiva Goldsman did uncredited final rewrites on the film. He said that he felt "the decision to steer just a little closer to Alien in multiple ways somewhat limited the film from breaking out even bigger at the box office [...] smart sharks in 'our world' made the movie fresh, but being a little too Alien-esque overall maybe held it back". However, he concluded that the final film "was very much the movie [he'd] envisioned in terms of the visuals, the world, the story journey and the audience experience".

Deep Blue Sea had a budget of $60–82 million and represented a test for Renny Harlin, who had not made a commercially successful film since Cliffhanger in 1993. Harlin's main goal was to bring the horror genre back to the serious and high-budget production values of films like The Exorcist, Jaws and The Shining, as opposed to the tongue-in-cheek style of subsequent films in the genre. Alien was an influence on the casting process, as Harlin wanted to cast the characters in a way as to make it impossible for the audience to know who was going to die or survive. To achieve this, he combined relatively unknown actors who could deliver solid performances and meet the physical demands of the diving and stunts with an established star such as Samuel L. Jackson, who "anchors the whole piece". Harlin also forced the studio into hiring rapper LL Cool J as Preacher Dudley because he wanted a character who could bring "a lot of warmth and humor to the film" without making outright jokes.

=== Filming ===
Principal photography for Deep Blue Sea began on August 3, 1998. Most of the film was shot at Fox Baja Studios in Rosarito, where the production team constructed sets above the large water tanks that had been built for James Cameron's 1997 film Titanic. Some of the sets were designed so that they could be submerged, while others were built on sound stages with fishtanks used as windows. At Fox Baja Studios, the cast worked with sharks that were either animatronic or computer-generated. As the shark used in Jaws was 25 feet long, Harlin decided to increase their animatronic shark to 26 feet. Jackson recalled, "When they first brought it into the lab, we were all in awe of the size of this machine. It was a real monster. I would walk up to it slowly and touch it, and they said it felt like a real shark. The gills moved, and it had a mind of its own sometimes." As an added homage, the license plate pulled from the shark's teeth by Carter Blake (Thomas Jane) is the same one found in the tiger shark's carcass in Jaws. Three 15-foot animatronics were also used to represent the first-generation mako sharks.

After the shoot at Fox Baja Studios wrapped, Harlin insisted the team go to the Bahamas to shoot with real sharks. Recounting his experience there, Jane said, "The first day, I was in a cage, but the next day, they swam me 30 feet down. Then this guy yanks the breather off me, and the water's churning with blood and guts and stuff. It was so terrifying that I don't want to remember it." The idea was to mix footage of real sharks with animatronic and computer-generated sharks to ensure a seamless transition between them all. To distinguish Deep Blue Sea from Jaws, where the shark is frequently hidden, Harlin decided to show theirs more prominently because he felt that audience expectations had changed since then.

The scene where the cast is trying to get back to the elevator after hooking up Stellan Skarsgård's character Jim Whitlock to the helicopter is actually an accident that made it into the finished film. As Jackson explained, "At one point, three tons of water got thrown on us by accident, and we got swept toward those cargo bays, and everyone thought we were going into the drink, and people were tumbling around this metal grating. We scrambled up and kept acting. That was not supposed to happen, and we didn't have safety harnesses on, and we were flailing around on this deck." Jackson was initially offered the role of Preacher, but his management team did not like the idea of him playing a cook for unknown reasons, so Harlin created the character of Russell Franklin for him. Preacher was supposed to die early on, but Harlin ultimately decided to keep him and he ends up being one of only two survivors. The production team could not afford to have a fully trained parrot for Preacher's pet, so they used two parrots: one that was good at flying, and another that could sit on his shoulder.

The film's ending was changed shortly before its theatrical release. Originally, Saffron Burrows' character, Susan McAlester, escaped from the shark and lived. However, this angered test audiences, who did not forget that she was responsible for the situation in the first place and was seen as the film's villain aside from the sharks themselves. As a result, the production team did a one-day reshoot in the Universal Studios tank and some computer-generated work on the sharks to change it. A fan petition was created in 2019, calling on Warner Bros. to release the original ending, and received support from Jane and Harlin.

In 2009, on the film's 10th anniversary, Harlin explained that Deep Blue Sea was the hardest film he had ever made because most of the shooting days involved the team standing in water or being underwater for long periods. According to him, "Just the practicality of putting a wet suit on in the morning, being in the water all day. Your script, all your paperwork, has to be made of plastic paper. And things that you wouldn't think would ever float, they float. [...] Or then things that you hope would float actually sink and you can't find them anywhere."

== Music ==
The score for Deep Blue Sea was composed by Trevor Rabin and ranges from orchestral and choral arrangements to electronic soundscapes, noted for its use of both dramatic and easily accessible themes. The soundtrack features two songs by LL Cool J, "Deepest Bluest (Shark's Fin)" and "Say What", which were used in the end credits; the former was written for the film, while the latter was taken from one of his albums. Two soundtrack albums were also released for the film. The first album, Deep Blue Sea: Music from the Motion Picture, was released by Warner Bros. Records on August 3, 1999, and features a set of hip-hop and R&B tracks by several artists, including Hi-C, Cormega and Bass Odyssey. The second album, Deep Blue Sea: Original Motion Picture Score, was released by Varèse Sarabande on August 24, 1999, and contains musical tracks by Rabin.

== Release ==
=== Home media ===
Deep Blue Sea was first released on DVD on December 7, 1999, courtesy of Warner Home Video. Special features include the film in a 2.35:1 anamorphic format, two behind-the-scene featurettes, five deleted scenes with extended dialogue and relationships between the characters, and an audio commentary in which Harlin and Jackson discuss the film's technical features and special effects. Warner also released the film on Blu-ray on October 12, 2010, which includes the same special features from the DVD release. On March 18, 2025, Arrow Films released Deep Blue Sea on 4K Blu-ray.

== Reception ==
=== Box office ===
Deep Blue Sea performed well when it opened in 2,854 theaters on July 30, 1999, finishing third and grossing around $18.6 million at the US weekend box office. During its second weekend, the film grossed an estimated $11 million and finished in fifth place, behind The Sixth Sense, The Blair Witch Project, Runaway Bride and The Thomas Crown Affair. Deep Blue Sea grossed over $73.7 million the United States and Canada and $91.4 million internationally, grossing over $165 million worldwide. The film's performance was compared to Stephen Sommers' The Mummy and Jan de Bont's The Haunting, which had a similar budget and made a significant impact on the box office in the summer of 1999.

=== Critical response ===
Review aggregator Rotten Tomatoes reported an approval rating of 60% based on 116 reviews, with an average rating of 6.0/10. The site's critics consensus reads, "Deep Blue Sea is no Jaws, but action fans seeking some toothy action can certainly do—and almost certainly have done—far worse for B-movie thrills." On Metacritic, the film has a weighted average score of 54 out of 100, based on 22 critics, indicating "mixed or average" reviews. Audiences polled by CinemaScore gave the film an average grade of "B" on an A+ to F scale.

Writing for Chicago Sun-Times, Roger Ebert gave the film three out of four stars and praised it as "a skillful thriller", saying that it "is essentially one well-done action sequence after another [...] it doesn't linger on the special effects (some of the sharks look like cartoons), but it knows how to use timing, suspense, quick movement and [especially] surprise". He concluded that the film keeps spectators guessing in an otherwise predictable genre.

Kenneth Turan of Los Angeles Times considered Deep Blue Sea a return to form for Harlin, especially after the "dismal swamps" of Cutthroat Island and The Long Kiss Goodnight. He described the film as "an example of how expert action filmmaking and up-to-the-minute visual effects can transcend a workmanlike script and bring excitement to conventional genre material". Desson Howe of The Washington Post remarked that, while the film's premise feels familiar, it "knows its audience and knows what'll get them going—and even wondering". He said that Deep Blue Sea might not be Harlin's finest two hours, but he managed to build "something that, if nothing else, gives you a great big shock every few minutes". In a three-and-a-half out of four review, Robert Lasowski of The Florida Times-Union highly praised the film's pacing, intense action, and chase scenes, stating that Deep Blue Sea is "a great popcorn movie [and] what summer at the cineplex is all about".

Other reviews were less enthusiastic. Stephen Holden of The New York Times described it as "a cut-rate Titanic stripped of romance and historical resonance and fused with Jaws, shorn of mythic symbolism and without complex characters", while Barbara Shulgasser of the Chicago Tribune criticized it for being an inferior imitation of Jurassic Park but praised its realistic setting and LL Cool J's performance. Ian Nathan of Empire gave the film three out of five stars and criticized its B-movie conventions, stating that "you're never entirely sure whether you're laughing at or with" the film. Robert Koehler of Variety felt the computer-generated sharks were inconsistently realized, but highlighted the flooding of the facility very positively. The dialogue between action sequences was also praised, especially LL Cool J's "blend of Bible talk, smack, and wit". Despite his few lines, Jane was seen as a charismatic character and "a genuine new action star".

=== Legacy ===
As Jaws created a cycle of shark-oriented horror films which ended in the 1980s, Deep Blue Sea revived the cycle towards the end of the 20th century. Following the film's release, similar B-movies were released such as the Shark Attack film series, Red Water (2003), and Frankenfish (2004). Nils Bothmann observed that some of these films, such as Shark Attack and Shark Attack 2, shared similarities with Deep Blue Sea including genetically mutated sharks or sharks that breach underwater fences, while most were still indebted to Jaws.

In retrospect, the film has been viewed much more positively. In 2016, Wired editor Brian Raftery called it "the greatest non-Jaws shark movie of all time" and superior to Jaume Collet-Serra's The Shallows. He remarked that, within a genre that had been dominated by Jaws, the film features "genuinely inventive" action sequences, "nicely rounded-out, human" characters, and memorable death scenes. Raftery also noted that the film was among the last of its kind, describing it as "[a]n R-rated B-movie, full of gore and chaos and smart-stupidness, but with a big-budget, big-cast sheen" in a similar way to Paul Verhoeven's Total Recall and Starship Troopers, Roland Emmerich's Stargate and Luc Besson's The Fifth Element. The scene in which Jackson's character is unexpectedly grabbed by the sharks has appeared on lists of the best film deaths of all time.

Deep Blue Sea has often been cited as one of the greatest shark films of all time. In 2012, PopMatters ranked the film third behind Jaws and Open Water, and described it as one of Harlin's "last great [films]". In 2015, Den of Geek ranked it behind only Jaws and credited it for its action-packed scenes and intelligent sharks. In 2017, Slant Magazine ranked it seventh and highlighted Jackson's death scene and LL Cool J's performance, while Complex ranked it third, praising its talented actors and tight action sequences. In 2019, to celebrate the 20th anniversary of the film, the Screamfest Horror Film Festival hosted a screening at Grauman's Chinese Theatre in Hollywood as part of its "Fears & Beers" program. Cast members, including Jane, attended a post-screening Q&A moderated by Brian Collins of Birth.Movies.Death.

== Sequels ==
Two direct-to-video sequels have been released: Deep Blue Sea 2 in 2018 and Deep Blue Sea 3 in 2020.

== See also ==
- List of underwater science fiction works
- Deep Water (2026 film), another shark film directed by Renny Harlin
