= Grind (1997 film) =

- Film poster
- Directed by: Chris Kentis
- Written by: Laura Lau; Chris Kentis
- Produced by: Laura Lau
- Starring: Billy Crudup; Adrienne Shelly
- Cinematography: Stephen Kazmierski
- Edited by: Chris Kentis
- Music by: Brian Kelly
- Production company: Kodiak Productions
- Distributed by: Castle Hill Productions
- Release date: April 11, 1997
- Running time: 96 minutes
- Country: United States
- Language: English
- Box office: $5000 (US)

Grind is a 1997 American drama film directed by Chris Kentis and written by Laura Lau. It stars Billy Crudup, Adrienne Shelly, and Paul Schulze. Crudup plays an ex-con caught in a spiral of dead-end jobs and poor choices.

== Overview ==
A handsome drifter who has just been released from prison shows up on the doorstep of his older brother.

== Cast ==
- Billy Crudup as Eddie
- Adrienne Shelly as Janey
- Paul Schulze as Terry
- Frank Vincent as Nick
- Amanda Peet as Patty

== Release ==
Grind was released April 11, 1997, in the United States, where it made $5000.

== Reception ==
Stephen Holden of The New York Times wrote that the film initially has the potential to be "an American neo-realist gem" but descends into melodrama. Leonard Klady of Variety wrote, "While director and co-writer Chris Kentis' debut feature is not distinctive visually or more than mildly intriguing dramatically, neither is it offensive or inept." Nathan Rabin of The A.V. Club wrote, "While Grind captures its blue-collar milieu with a certain amount of accuracy and conviction, it can't overcome its weak, predictable script and uneven performances." Kevin Thomas of The Los Angeles Times called it "a fine and involving accomplishment" that should launch the careers of all involved.
