= Deep Blue Sea (film series) =

- Official film series logo
- Based on: Deep Blue Sea by Duncan Kennedy, Donna Powers & Wayne Powers
- Distributed by: Warner Bros. Pictures (Skydance)
- Country: United States
- Language: English

The Deep Blue Sea film series consists of American science fiction natural-horror films, centered around genetically enhanced-sharks. The overall plot of the series centers around scientific studies conducted by marine biologists. These experiments provide the predatory animals with heightened intelligence, inadvertently causing the sharks to attack the underwater facilities and hunt the researchers that created them. Director Renny Harlin had become well known for bringing stylish action sequences into his films, but he also was noted for pushing the boundaries of effects work. This was evident in his earliest forays into horror with A Nightmare on Elm Street 4: The Dream Master. For Deep Blue Sea, Harlin employed animatronics wizard Walt Conti and his company Edge Innovations (which previously worked on Anaconda), to create the most lifelike on-screen shark puppets at that point in time.

The first film was released in theaters in 1999 and was a box office success, though it received mixed reviews from film critics. Over time Deep Blue Sea has been labeled a cult classic by audience and critics alike. After years of being in development hell, a sequel was released straight-to-home video and VOD services in 2018. While initially debuting at No. 8 on the Top 20 Sellers for the week ended April 21, 2018 and being on-par with theatrical releases, Deep Blue Sea 2 was panned by critics. Deep Blue Sea 3 was released on July 28, 2020 through video on demand.

== Films ==
Film	U.S. release date	Director(s)	Screenwriter(s)	Story by	Producer(s)
Deep Blue Sea	July 28, 1999	Renny Harlin	Donna Powers, Wayne Powers & Duncan Kennedy	Donna Powers, Wayne Powers & Duncan Kennedy	Alan Riche, Tony Ludwig and Akiva Goldsman
Deep Blue Sea 2	April 17, 2018	Darin Scott	Jessica Scott, Hans Rodionoff & Erik Patterson	Hans Rodionoff	Tom Siegrist
Deep Blue Sea 3	July 28, 2020	John Pogue	Dirk Blackman	Dirk Blackman	Hunt Lowry and Patty Reed

=== Deep Blue Sea (1999) ===
On an island research facility, Dr. Susan McAlester is conducting experiments to cure Alzheimer's disease, by harvesting the brain tissue of DNA-altered mako sharks. When the facility's benefactors send a company executive to investigate the under-water facility, a routine procedure is disrupted after a shark attacks the researchers.

During the attack the protective glass, keeping the ocean outside of the building, is fractured. As the security systems begins to enter lockdown as a safety procedure, the enhanced sharks make their way into the outpost with the incoming water. Now, with sharks outnumbering their human captors, McAlester and her team must figure out a way to stop the hyper-intelligent sharks from escaping to the ocean, which would lead to the altered species reproducing. Together the group fights for survival, racing against the clock, while being hunted by the predatory animals.

=== Deep Blue Sea 2 (2018) ===
A shark conservation biologist named Dr. Misty Calhoun, is hired in a consultory position for a non-public confidential project involving genetically-enhanced bull sharks. Funded by a pharmaceutical billionaire with questionable ethics, the mogul plans to medically market intelligence. During a routine procedure, the sharks begin attacking the researchers and initiate security shutdown, causing mass flooding throughout the establishment. As the scientists fight for survival and race to the surface, the enhanced-sharks begin to hunt them.

=== Deep Blue Sea 3 (2020) ===
In August 2019, it was announced that a third film tentatively titled Deep Blue Sea 3 was in development, with intentions to serve as a Netflix exclusive film. By May 2020, it was revealed that the film had finished production within the last year, with principal photography taking place in Cape Town of the Republic of South Africa. John Pogue serves as director, with a script by Dirk Blackman, while Hunt Lowry and Patty Reed serve as producers.

The plot centers around Dr. Emma Collins, who leads a team at a small island studying the effects of climate change on great white sharks. The study is disrupted when her marine biologist ex-boyfriend named Richard arrives, searching for some enhanced-bull sharks. The film attained an R rating for "violence, bloody images, and language". The project was distributed by Warner Bros. Home Entertainment. The film was released on July 28, 2020 on video on demand, and on August 25, 2020 for home video.

=== Future ===
In November 2023, Tania Raymonde stated that a fourth movie is actively in development. The actress confirmed that she will reprise her role from the previous installment, while also announcing that there had already been completed drafts of a script at that time. Despite this, she also conceded that the combination of impacts that the COVID-19 pandemic, and the 2023 writers/actors strikes had on the project's development have delayed its production. Raymonde however reaffirmed her involvement with the production, while also reiterating that the studios have confirmed to her their collective intentions to produce the sequel.

== Main cast and characters ==
List indicator

This section includes characters who will appear or have appeared in the franchise in main roles.

- An empty grey cell indicates the character was not in the film, or that the character's official presence has not yet been confirmed.

Character	Films		
Character	Deep Blue Sea	Deep Blue Sea 2	Deep Blue Sea 3
Character	1999	2018	2020
Dr. Susan McAlester	Saffron Burrows		
Carter Blake	Thomas Jane		
Russell Franklin	Samuel L. Jackson		
Dr. Jim Whitlock	Stellan Skarsgård		
Janice "Jan" Higgins	Jacqueline McKenzie		
Tom Scoggins	Michael Rapaport		
Sherman "Preacher" Dudley	LL Cool J		
Brenda Kerns	Aida Turturro		
Dr. Misty Calhoun		Danielle Savre	
Trent Slater		Rob Mayes	
Carl Durant		Michael Beach	
Aaron Ellroy		Nathan Lynn	
Leslie Kim		Kim Syster	
Daniel Kim		Jeremy Jess Boado	
Josh Hooper		Cameron Robertson	
Dr. Emma Collins			Tania Raymonde
Richard			Nathaniel Buzolic
Eugene Shaw			Emerson Brooks
Lucas			Bren Foster

== Additional crew and production details ==
Film	Crew/Detail					
Film	Composer	Cinematographer	Editor(s)	Production companies	Distributing companies	Running time
Deep Blue Sea	Trevor Rabin	Stephen F. Windon	Dallas Puett, Derek Brechin & Frank J. Urioste	Warner Bros. Pictures; Riche-Ludwig Productions; Village Roadshow Pictures; Groucho III Film Partnership	Warner Bros. Pictures	105 minutes
Deep Blue Sea 2	Sean Murray	Thomas L. Callaway	Michael Trent	Syfy Original Films; Warner Bros. Pictures	Syfy; Warner Bros. Home Entertainment	94 minutes
Deep Blue Sea 3	Mark Killian	Sven Vosloo	Eric Strand	Roserock Films	Warner Bros. Home Entertainment	99 minutes

== Reception ==
=== Box office ===
Film	Box office gross			Box office ranking		Video sales gross	Gross running income	Budget	Ref.
Film	North America	Other territories	Worldwide	All time North America	All time worldwide	North America	Gross running income	Budget	Ref.
Deep Blue Sea	$73,648,228	$91,400,000	$165,048,228	#1,104	#1,037	information not available	$165,048,228	$60,000,000	
Deep Blue Sea 2	—N/a	—N/a	—N/a	—N/a	—N/a	$1,641,517	$1,641,517	information not available	
Deep Blue Sea 3	—N/a	—N/a	—N/a	—N/a	—N/a	$653,537	$653,537	information not available	
Totals	$73,648,228	$91,400,000	$165,048,228	x̅ #1,104	x̅ #1,037	>$2,295,054	>$167,343,282	>$60,000,000	

=== Critical and public response ===
Film	Rotten Tomatoes	Metacritic	CinemaScore
Deep Blue Sea	60% (115 reviews)	54/100 (22 reviews)	B
Deep Blue Sea 2	0% (5 reviews)	—N/a	—N/a
Deep Blue Sea 3	73% (15 reviews)	—N/a	—N/a
