= Eric Sheffer Stevens =

American actor (born 1972)

- Born: Eric Stevens; June 19, 1972 (age 54); Sacramento, California, U.S.
- Occupation: Actor
- Years active: 2005–present

Eric Sheffer Stevens (born June 19, 1972) is an American actor. He played Dr. Reid Oliver on the CBS soap opera As the World Turns, first appearing in January 2010. From 2011 to 2012, he co-starred on the Fox sitcom I Hate My Teenage Daughter alongside Jaime Pressly.

== Filmography ==
=== Film ===
Year	Title	Role	Notes
2005	The Dig	—N/a	Short film
2008	Dream Date	Derek	Short film
2008	Bittersweet	Andrew	
2009	Julie & Julia	Tim	
2009	According to Greta	Yellow sweater guy	
2010	Multiple Sarcasms	Stage Gabriel #1	
2011	Silent House	Peter	
2011	Lefty Loosey Righty Tighty	Franklin	
2014	5 Flights Up	Mr. Schuyler	

=== Television ===
Year	Title	Role	Notes
2006	Law & Order	M.E. Laraby	Episode: "Magnet"
2006	Numbers	Search team member	Episode: "Mind Games"
2006	Invasion	National Guard driver	Episode: "Round Up"
2007	Law & Order: Criminal Intent	Tom "Chilly" Chilton	Episode: "Depths"
2008	Law & Order	Frank Beezley	Episode: "Excalibur"
2010	As the World Turns	Reid Oliver	Role held: January 19 – September 7, 2010
2010	The Big C	Andy	Episode: "The Ecstasy and the Agony"
2011	Law & Order: Criminal Intent	Aston Skinner	Episode: "The Last Street in Manhattan"
2011	Body of Proof	Bill Parkson	2 episodes
2011–12	I Hate My Teenage Daughter	Matt Gutierrez	Main cast; 13 episodes
2013	Elementary	Tim Spalding	Episode: "On the Line"
2014	The Good Wife	Pete	Episode: "Goliath and David"
2014	Nurse Jackie	—N/a	Episode: "Rat on a Cheeto"
2015	Eye Candy	Hamish Stone	3 episodes
2015	The Mysteries of Laura	Scott Clark	Episode: "The Mystery of the Maternal Instinct"
2016	Deadbeat	Brody	Episode: "Digging Up the Past"
2016	Sex & Drugs & Rock & Roll	Brook Lanley	3 episodes
