= Silent House (2011 film) =

2011 film by Chris Kentis

- Directed by: Chris Kentis; Laura Lau
- Screenplay by: Laura Lau
- Based on: The Silent House by Oscar Estevez
- Produced by: Agnes Mentre; Laura Lau
- Starring: Elizabeth Olsen; Adam Trese; Eric Sheffer Stevens; Julia Taylor Ross; Adam Barnett; Haley Murphy
- Cinematography: Igor Martinović
- Music by: Nathan Larson
- Production companies: LD Entertainment; Elle Driver Productions; Eye for an Eye Filmworks; Tazora Films; Cinema Management Group
- Distributed by: Open Road Films
- Release dates: January 21, 2011 (Sundance); March 9, 2012 (United States)
- Running time: 87 minutes
- Country: United States
- Language: English
- Budget: $2 million
- Box office: $13.1 million

Silent House is a 2011 American independent psychological horror film directed by Chris Kentis and Laura Lau, and starring Elizabeth Olsen. The plot focuses on a young woman who is terrorized in her family vacation home while cleaning the property with her father and uncle. An English-language remake of the 2010 Uruguayan film, La Casa Muda (lit. English:The Silent House), which was allegedly based on an actual incident that occurred in a village in Uruguay in the 1940s. It is notable for its use of "real time" footage and the manufactured appearance of a single continuous shot, similar to Alfred Hitchcock's Rope (1948).

The film premiered at the Sundance Film Festival in January 2011 and was subsequently purchased by Open Road Films and Universal Pictures for distribution. Silent House premiered in United States theaters on March 9, 2012. It opened at number 5 at the U.S. box office, earning $6.6 million during its opening weekend; it would go on to gross a total of $12.8 million domestically. The film received mixed reviews from critics.

== Plot ==
A young woman named Sarah is staying at her family's dilapidated Victorian house in the countryside with her father John and her uncle Peter, helping them fix it to be put up for sale. After a petty argument between John and Peter, Peter leaves and drives into town for extra tools. Sarah meets a young woman named Sophia at the front door. Sophia claims to be one of Sarah's childhood friends, though Sarah does not remember her.

Soon after, Sarah panics when she hears John falling down the stairs. She tries to leave the house but all exits are blocked, and she hides from an unknown perpetrator. She finds John unconscious with a head wound and runs to the basement in search of the cellar door that leads outside. She finds a bed and other evidence that someone else has been living there, possibly squatters. She sees a figure searching for her and escapes out the cellar door.

Outside, she meets Peter, who has returned, and sees a young girl on the road who disappears. Peter and Sarah discover John's body missing in the house. When the power is cut off, the only light source available to them is the flash on a Polaroid camera. Through a series of camera flashes, Sarah sees the young girl and a man in the room. The power returns to reveal Peter missing. Sarah hides while two men take pictures, presumably pedophilic in nature, of an unseen girl. Sarah tries to shoot one of the men with Peter's gun, then hides in her room and begins to show signs of paranoia and psychosis. She experiences hallucinations of traumatic childhood events, including a bloodstain on the bed and the young girl in the bathtub with beer bottles and bloody water.

Frightened, Sarah flees and runs into Sophia. John, now conscious, is wrapped in plastic and sitting in the living room. Sophia gives Sarah a key to a box containing pedophilic pictures of Sarah as a little girl, implying that John sexually abused her. It is suggested that her recent interactions and hallucinations with the little girl and mystery attacker have been a traumatic repressed memory. Events at the house have caused this memory to reappear, and Sarah is now exacting her revenge. She has been confusing the events of her childhood with what she is doing now, likely due to dissociative identity disorder. She assaults John and Peter in her "intruder" mode while simultaneously wandering the house as a victim trying to escape.

The "intruder" drags Peter into the living room before it is revealed that it's actually Sarah herself. Sophia also turns out to be a figment of her imagination. John convinces Sarah to untie him, then whips her with his belt. Peter tries to stop him but John mocks Peter's pleas. As his back is turned, Sarah bludgeons his head with a sledgehammer, killing him. Peter begs for mercy and tells her he should have stopped the rape and abuse from the hands of John. Sarah leaves him and walks out silently. Peter’s fate in the aftermath remains a mystery.

== Cast ==
- Elizabeth Olsen as Sarah
- Adam Trese as John
- Eric Sheffer Stevens as Peter
- Julia Taylor Ross as Sophia
- Adam Barnett as Stalking Man
- Haley Murphy as Little Girl

== Production ==
=== Development ===
The script for the film was written by Laura Lau, and based on the Uruguayan film La casa muda (2010). According to Lau, she saw the original film twice and wrote the script for the remake based on the viewings rather than adapting it from paper. The script ultimately came out to around fifty-five to sixty pages, which left the filmmakers concerned as to whether or not the timing would translate during filming: "We wondered whether it would time out properly, because there are no cuts," said Lau. "There’s no way to fix anything in post, it has to pace perfectly when you shoot it. So I think that was a huge challenge in terms of writing the script." Upon acquiring the house used for filming, Lau re-wrote the script in order for it to be compatible with the restrictions and characteristics of the house.

In terms of the film's unique presentation (being presented as a single take following one character), Lau said: "This entire movie is this woman's experience; it is her reality [...] it is one character's point of view, it's exactly what she's experiencing." She also stated that several aspects of the film were purposefully left open for interpretation. While writing the script for the film, Lau did extensive research on childhood sexual abuse and posttraumatic stress disorder stemming from psychological trauma.

Although the film's marketing campaign (as well as the promotion for the original film La casa muda) states that it is inspired by actual events, the specific events are not entirely known. According to Lau, she and Kentis were told, when approached to make the film, that it was based on an occurrence in Uruguay, though the details were left ambiguous:

When we were approached to do the remake, the first thing that we were told, aside from the fact that it was a single take, was that it was based on a true story, and that the true story had to do with something that happened in a village in Uruguay like, 60 years ago, where there were dead bodies and incest was involved.

In terms of casting, Kentis and Lau sought an actress with theatrical training due to the demanding nature of the filming process; Elizabeth Olsen was cast as the lead after impressing Kentis and Lau with her audition.

=== Filming ===
The movie was shot with Canon EOS 5D Mark II cameras between October and November 2010 on location at a house in New Rochelle, New York. The house used in the film was found by directors Kentis and Lau entirely empty, and was wallpapered and filled with props and furniture by the production design.

Due to the unique nature of the film's presentation as a single take, the production crew ran into several technical issues while filming, mainly surrounding lighting issues and mobility around the house. Since filming was carried out in 12-15 minute takes, there were several occurrences where entire sequences had to be thrown out and re-done repeatedly due to lighting problems or missed cues.

Although the promotional material for the film suggests that it was filmed in real time in a single long take, Elizabeth Olsen revealed that the movie was actually filmed in 12-minute takes and edited so as to appear as one, which was later confirmed by Kentis and Lau.

Directors Kentis and Lau stated that they were inspired by Alfred Hitchcock's Rope (1948) and Russian Ark (2002), both purported single take films, as well as the home invasion thriller The Strangers (2008). Due to the unconventional filming process and storytelling mode, Kentis felt he was making an "experimental film." He also stated that the presentation and storytelling mode of the film as a single take was the main focus of the production, and that the fact that there were cuts in the film was irrelevant.

== Release ==
The world premiere of the film was at the 2011 Sundance Film Festival, as part of the "Park City at Midnight" program; Kentis, Lau, and Olsen also appeared. It was released theatrically in the United States on March 9, 2012.

=== Box office ===
The film opened at number 5 at the United States box office, earning $6,661,234 during its opening weekend, showing on 2,124 screens. It would go on to show in theaters until late April 2012, grossing a total of $12,754,783 domestically. In foreign markets, it grossed a total of USD$346,889.

=== Critical reception ===
As of May 2025, the film has an approval rating of 42% on Rotten Tomatoes based on 134 reviews, with an average rating of 5.30/10. The website's critics consensus reads: "Silent House is more technically proficient and ambitious than most fright-fests, but it also suffers from a disappointing payoff." On Metacritic the film has a weighted average score of 49 out of 100, based on 30 critic reviews, indicating "mixed or average reviews". The film received a harsh reception from audiences, earning an "F" grade from CinemaScore surveys (only the second movie of the year to receive the failing grade along with The Devil Inside).

Neil Genzlinger of The New York Times praised Olsen's performance and the cinematography. Some other publications, such as The Daily Telegraph, also applauded Olsen's performance, calling it "brilliantly nervy and detailed", while Peter Bradshaw of The Guardian said Olsen "isn't as interesting as she was in Martha Marcy May Marlene", and said the film, despite being atmospheric, "feels like a copy". Nonetheless, he awarded the film a 3/5 star rating. The Star Tribune described the film as "a psychotic episode come to life", and that it "follows the form of a Gothic novel", applauding it as being "impressive and oppressive". Others praised the technical production of the film, such as The Atlantic, who noted "the camera's unblinking eye constantly stays with Olsen, and we feel in as much danger as she is." Jonathan Crocker of Total Film described the camera as "gliding with impressive agility, the queasy HD lensing closes in tight and tracks Olsen’s petrified face, room to room", and, although critical of the film's ending, called the film "brutally effective" and "a fun campfire horror tale".

Other critics found the film's technicality unappealing, with Rob Gonsalves of eFilmcritic saying "the underlit setting occasionally produces unsettling, suggestive imagery, but the technique took me out of the movie," while The Observer accused the film of "wasting the talent of Elizabeth Olsen." The staff of The A.V. Club named it one of the worst movies of 2012, noting its "mediocrity takes a downward turn in a final act that hinges on an icky, exploitative twist." Roger Ebert awarded the film two out of four stars, writing: "My attention was held for the first act or so. Then any attempt at realism was abandoned, and it became clear that the house, and the movie containing it, were devices to manufacture methodical thrills. The explanation, if that's what it was, seemed devised and unconvincing."

David Edelstein of Vulture praised the film, defending it against the perceived critical backlash, writing: "It’s odd that the CinemaScore rating for Silent House, a more than decent gimmicky scare picture that opened last Friday, is an “F” — suggesting that critics like me are more excited by formal inventiveness than most of the film-going public." In a 2017 retrospective by Film School Rejects, Silent House was named one of the most "underrated" horror films of the twenty-first century. Psychologist Sharon Packer notes the film as an example of dissociative identity disorder in contemporary horror films, alongside other genre films such as High Tension (2005) and The Uninvited (2009).

=== Home media ===
Silent House was released on Blu-ray and DVD on July 24, 2012 in North America by Universal Pictures Home Video.

== See also ==
- List of films featuring home invasions
- Long take

== Works cited ==
- Kentis, Chris; Lau, Laura (2012). Silent House (DVD). Universal Pictures Home Video. audio commentary.
