= Susan May Pratt =

American actress (born 1974)

- Born: February 8, 1974 (age 52); East Lansing, Michigan, U.S.
- Years active: 1997–present
- Spouse: Kenneth Mitchell (m. 2006; died 2024)
- Children: 2

Susan May Pratt (born February 8, 1974) is an American actress. She played Mandella in 10 Things I Hate About You, Alicia DeGasario in Drive Me Crazy, and Maureen Cummings in Center Stage.

== Personal life ==
A native of East Lansing, Michigan, Pratt is the younger of two daughters born to Sally and William P. Pratt. She attended East Lansing High School. As of August 2015, Pratt was finishing her bachelor's degree in business, while working on prerequisites for a master's program in occupational therapy at the University of Southern California.

She married Canadian actor Kenneth Mitchell in May 2006; Mitchell died from ALS in February 2024. They have two children together, daughter Lilah and son Kallum.

== Filmography ==
=== Film ===
Year	Title	Role	Notes
1998	No Looking Back	Annie	
1998	The Substitute 2: School's Out	Anya Thomasson	Direct-to-video
1999	10 Things I Hate About You	Mandella	
1999	Drive Me Crazy	Alicia DeGasario	
2000	Center Stage	Maureen Cummings	
2002	Searching for Paradise	Gilda Mattei	
2003	Undermind	Olivia / Lucy	
2006	Open Water 2: Adrift	Amy	
2008	Who's Your Monkey?	Rebecca	also known as Throwing Stars
2011	Act Naturally	Kristi Lerner	
2015	The Gift	Rhonda Ryan	
2019	Act Super Naturally	Kristi Lerner	post-production

=== Television ===
Year	Title	Role	Notes
1998	Law & Order	Leslie Crowell	Episode: "Carrier"
2000	Third Watch	Shannon	Episode: "After Hours"
2001	Dead Last	Katie Kaitler	Episode: "The Mulravian Candidate"
2002	Charms for the Easy Life	Margaret	Television film
2003	Hunger Point	Shelly Hunter	Television film
2003	Charmed	Miranda / Nymph #1	Episode: "Nymphs Just Wanna Have Fun"
2004	Strong Medicine	Cammie	Episode: "Omissions"
2004	CSI: Crime Scene Investigation	Tara Newsome, Juror	Episodes: "Eleven Angry Jurors"
2004	L.A. Dragnet	Joanna Kutler	Episode: "Riddance"
2005	Ghost Whisperer	Lisa	Episode: "Ghost Bride"
2008	The Cleaner	Tess	Episode: "Chaos Theory"
2009	Eleventh Hour	Erica Gillman	Episode: "Minamata"
2009	Private Practice	Barbara	Episode: "Slip Slidin' Away"
2010	Mad Men	Mother	Episode: "Hands and Knees"
2010	The Defenders	Laura Reid	Episode: "Las Vegas vs Reid"
2010	Off the Map	Becky	Episode: "I'm Home"
2012	CSI: Crime Scene Investigation	April Reynolds	Episode: "Altered Stakes"
2012	Franklin & Bash	Mrs. Janice Dale	Episode: "650 to SLC"
2012	Drop Dead Diva	Beth Evans	Episode: "Family Matters"
2015	CSI: Cyber	Fran Reynolds	Episode: "Kidnapping 2.0"
2015	Masters of Sex	Joy Edley	3 episodes
2017	Outcast	Helen Devere	3 episodes
