= Deep Blue Sea 2 =

2018 film

- Official DVD/Blu-ray cover
- Directed by: Darin Scott
- Screenplay by: Hans Rodionoff; Jessica Scott; Erik Patterson
- Story by: Hans Rodionoff
- Based on: Characters by: Duncan Kennedy; Donna Powers; Wayne Powers
- Produced by: Tom Siegrist
- Starring: Danielle Savre; Michael Beach; Rob Mayes
- Cinematography: Thomas L. Callaway
- Edited by: Michael Trent
- Music by: Sean Murray
- Production companies: Millennium Films; Nu Boyana Film Studios; DO Productions; Film Afrika Worldwide
- Distributed by: Warner Bros. Home Entertainment; Syfy
- Release date: April 17, 2018
- Running time: 94 minutes
- Country: United States
- Language: English

Deep Blue Sea 2 is a 2018 American science fiction horror film directed by Darin Scott. It is a stand-alone sequel to the 1999 film Deep Blue Sea and the second installment of the Deep Blue Sea film series, and stars Danielle Savre, Michael Beach and Rob Mayes. In the film, shark conservationist Misty Calhoun is hired to consult on a top-secret project involving genetically enhanced bull sharks funded by pharmaceutical billionaire Carl Durant. However, the highly intelligent super-sharks turn on their masters and begin to pick them off one by one. The film was released direct-to-video by Warner Bros. Home Entertainment on April 17, 2018. It was followed by Deep Blue Sea 3.

== Plot ==
In a small boat off the coast of South Africa, two fishermen are killing sharks to harvest their dorsal fins. A warning is sent out over the radio and via flare, advising all vessels to leave the area immediately as it is dangerous, but the fishermen refuse to leave. A group of bull sharks begin to repeatedly ram their boat in co-ordinated fashion, knocking them into the water where they are killed.

Shark conservationist Misty Calhoun is invited to visit the sea-based facility Akhelios by pharmaceutical billionaire Carl Durant. She and neurobiology students Leslie and Daniel Kim are taken to the facility by Carl's associate Craig Burns on a motorboat. When they arrive, they meet Carl, as well as the facility's crew, which include shark trainers Trent Slater, Mike Shutello and Josh Hooper, and computer technician Aaron Ellroy. As a demonstration, Carl throws Aaron into the water, letting the sharks chase him: at the last possible second, he uses a special device to drive them away in formation. Carl explains that he has been genetically altering the brains of five bull sharks to make them smarter, which renders Misty concerned.

The group subsequently convenes in the wet lab, where Carl explains to Misty that the reason he invited her is that the alpha shark, Bella, has been acting strangely, to which Misty concludes is because she is pregnant. Carl is puzzled by this because her pregnancy did not come up on any tests they ran on her, and Misty theorizes that their genetic alterations hid this. Carl then brings Bella into the wet lab, and has Josh take samples of her saliva, although Bella attempts to bite his arm; he narrowly avoids this. Meanwhile, on the surface, a second shark pushes the motorboat into an electric control box, causing it to explode, and creating significant damage. This also shuts down some systems within the facility. The sharks then begin flooding the facility and Craig is killed while the others are inside the wet lab. Misty then realizes that Bella went into labor after being dropped back into the pool, and has given birth to a series of shark pups, which previously attacked Craig.

Mike attempts to swim to the surface, but one of the sharks knocks him unconscious; Trent rescues him and Misty manages to revive him. As he leans over the pool to pick up his mask from the water, one of the sharks beheads him. As a result of a lack of pressure stabilization in the room, the water from the pool pours in, and the group becomes separated, with Leslie knocked unconscious in the flooding; Carl and Daniel both end up alone. Misty and Trent become stranded together, as do Aaron and Josh. Trent reveals to Misty that Carl has been doing the same experiments on himself using a genetics-altering liquid to make himself more intelligent, due to his phobia that technology will one day rule the world. Carl reunites with Misty and Trent soon after, and they make their way to an air ventilation shaft that will lead to the surface.

Aaron and Josh arrive in one of the sleeping quarters, but the shark pups find them and kill Josh while Aaron escapes on an air mattress. Misty, Trent, and Carl arrive at the shaft, but Carl locks her out of the room after she attempts to find other survivors, which enrages Trent. The two manage to reach the surface. Meanwhile, Daniel finds Leslie behind a door and the shark pups kill her in front of him. He is soon found by Aaron, who was attacked by the pups and lost the mattress, and they attempt to find a way to the surface. Misty, meanwhile, uses a blow torch to get inside the room with the ventilation shaft and is met by Aaron and Daniel. The shark pups then find them, and Misty distracts them while Aaron and Daniel begin climbing to the surface. The water rises as they climb to the surface, which allows the pups to reach Daniel and bisect him while Aaron reaches the surface. Meanwhile, Misty, using scuba gear she found in Trent's quarters, manages to swim to the surface and reunite with the others.

Realizing that the facility is sinking, and they cannot stay any longer, the group makes a break for the motorboat. Aaron is dragged underwater by one of the sharks while Carl is confronted by Bella, and seemingly scares her away. However, moments later, Bella jumps up and kills him, while Misty and Trent reach the motorboat and use two flare guns to kill one of the sharks. Aaron then jumps onto the boat, explaining that he escaped one of the sharks. Misty tells Trent that they cannot let the sharks roam in the open ocean, and Trent, explaining that Carl planned for this precise event, blows up the facility with a self-destruct mechanism, killing many sharks offscreen. Misty, Trent and Aaron then escape on the motorboat. However, it is soon revealed that Bella and many of her pups somehow survived the explosion and are now free in the open ocean.

== Cast ==
- Danielle Savre as Dr. Misty Calhoun, a shark conservationist
- Rob Mayes as Trent Slater, a highly decorated ex-Navy SEAL
- Michael Beach as Carl Durant, a big pharmaceutical billionaire with questionable ethics
- Nathan Lynn as Aaron Ellroy, a tech expert
- Kim Syster as Leslie Kim, a neurobiology student and Daniel's wife
- Jeremy Jess Boado as Daniel Kim, a clinical neurophysiology student and Leslie's husband
- Darron Meyer as Craig Burns, Carl's right-hand man.
- Adrian Collins as Mike Shutello, Trent's partner.
- Cameron Robertson as Josh Hooper, Aaron's friend and a scientist

== Production ==
In 2008, Warner Premiere was planning a direct-to-video sequel to Renny Harlin's Deep Blue Sea, which would be directed by Jack Perez and released sometime in 2009. The project, though, did not materialize. Even so, in June 2017, it was announced that the sequel directed by Darin Scott had begun filming in Cape Town, South Africa. In January 2018, Warner Bros. Home Entertainment released a trailer for Deep Blue Sea 2.

== Music ==
A soundtrack was released on April 16, 2018, with one song titled as "Into The Blue" which was the film's title theme performed by Sean Murray who was also the composer of the film's soundtrack. The soundtrack was released under Dragon's Domain Records in a limited edition of 500 units.

== Release ==
=== Home media ===
On April 17, 2018, Deep Blue Sea 2 was released on Blu-ray combo pack, DVD and Digital HD, the first two of which contain two featurettes—"Returning to the Deep – The Making of Deep Blue Sea 2" and "Deep Blue Sea 2: Death by Shark"—gag reel, and deleted scenes.

The direct-to-video release Deep Blue Sea 2 debuted at #8 on the Top 20 Sellers for the week ended April 21, 2018, alongside two theatrical new releases, the Tom Hanks film The Post (#4 debut) and the Liam Neeson film The Commuter (#3 debut). Deep Blue Sea 2 achieved an Index of 12.56 versus 28.71 for The Post and 36.83 for The Commuter. Blu-ray disc accounted for 35% of the sales for Deep Blue Sea 2 versus 48% for The Post and 50% for The Commuter. The Deep Blue Sea 2 home video debut Ranking and Index was approximately on-par with the home video debut of theatrical release Insidious: The Last Key two weeks earlier. While it remained in the top 20 Sellers in its second week of release (the week ended 04-28-18,) Deep Blue Sea 2 dropped ten places in its second week, a drop approximately in line with The Post which dropped seven places in its second week.

Deep Blue Sea 2 also released the same week on VOD. It debuted at #10 on the Microsoft Store VOD chart for the week ended 04-23-18 just behind theatrical release Insidious: The Last Key and maintained its position at #10 the following week (for the week ended 04-30-18) just behind theatrical release, Matt Damon starrer Downsizing. The Deep Blue Sea 2 VOD debut ranking was approximately on-par with the VOD debut of theatrical release Winchester the following week. Deep Blue Sea 2 was the only non-theatrical release to appear in the top 10 of any VOD chart for the months of April and May 2018.

== Reception ==
On Rotten Tomatoes the film has a score of 0% based on reviews from five critics.

== Sequel ==
A third film, titled Deep Blue Sea 3, was released on VOD on July 28, 2020, and on Blu-ray and DVD on August 25, 2020.

== See also ==
- List of underwater science fiction works
