= Blanchard Ryan =

American actress (born 1967)

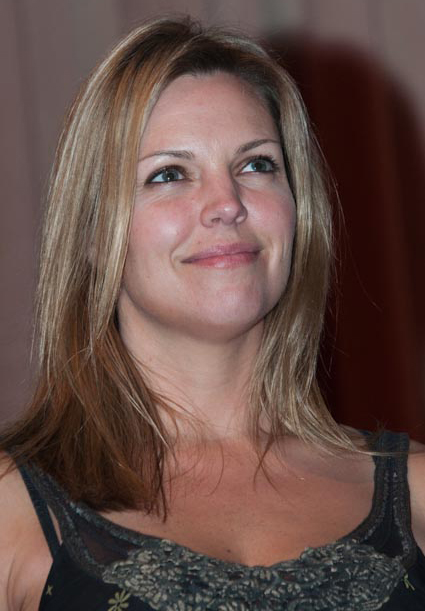
- Ryan (age 42) in February 2009
- Born: Susan Blanchard Ryan; January 12, 1967 (age 59); Boston, Massachusetts, U.S.
- Years active: 1998–present

Susan Blanchard Ryan is an American actress. After working in MTV and taking other minor parts on television and independent film, she starred in the 2003 film Open Water, for which she won the 2004 Saturn Award for Best Actress. She has since starred in the films The Brooklyn Heist and It's Complicated.

== Early life ==
Ryan was born in Boston, Massachusetts and was raised in Andover. Her mother Brenda is a French teacher, and her father Ron Ryan was a hockey coach.

== Career ==
After graduating from college, Ryan worked at MTV in its special-effects department. She began acting in commercials while studying acting and improvisation in New York City. As another actor named Susan Ryan was already registered with the Screen Actors Guild, Ryan instead used her middle name. In 2000, she appeared in an episode of Sex and the City. She appeared in the Broken Lizard films Super Troopers and Beerfest, as well as Big Helium Dog and several independent films. Ryan's most notable film role was in the 2003 film Open Water, for which she won the 2004 Saturn Award for Best Actress. Despite the film's success, she appeared in only one film in the next five years. She appeared in four films in 2008 and two in 2009, including Under New Management and It's Complicated.

== Filmography ==
Year	Title	Role	Notes
1998	On a Sidewalk in the Fall		Short film
1998	Remembering Sex	Brill	TV movie
1999	Big Helium Dog	Dancer	
2000	Sex and the City	Saleswoman	Episode: "Running with Scissors"
2001	Super Troopers	Casino La Fantastique Sally	
2001	My Sister's Wedding	Diana Dytwicz	
2001	Exceed	Commercial mom	Short film
2003	Bun-Bun	Mother	Short film
2003	Open Water	Susan Watkins	Saturn Award for Best Actress
2006	Beerfest	Krista Krundle	
2008	Pistol Whipped	Liz	
2008	No Exit	Leigh	
2008	The Brooklyn Heist	Samantha	
2008	Love to Kill	Frances Sweete	Alternative title: Fatal Kiss
2009	Cold Calls	Dana Ewing	
2009	Under New Management	Kelly	
2009	Cupid	Bosomy Ellie	Episode: "Shipping Out"
2009	It's Complicated	Annalise	
2011–2012	Blue Bloods	Reporter	2 episodes
2012	White Collar	Poppy Mailer	Episode: "Parting Shots"
2016	Good Bones	Mrs. Hunsecker	
2017	Orange Is the New Black	News 4 Female Reporter	2 episodes
