= Open Water (film) =

2003 film by Chris Kentis

- Theatrical release poster
- Directed by: Chris Kentis
- Written by: Chris Kentis
- Produced by: Laura Lau; Estelle Lau
- Starring: Blanchard Ryan; Daniel Travis
- Cinematography: Chris Kentis; Laura Lau
- Edited by: Chris Kentis
- Music by: Graeme Revell
- Production companies: Plunge Pictures LLC; Eastgate Pictures
- Distributed by: Lions Gate Films
- Release dates: October 26, 2003 (HIFF); August 6, 2004
- Running time: 79 minutes
- Country: United States
- Language: English
- Budget: $500,000
- Box office: $55.5 million

Open Water is a 2003 American independent survival horror film loosely based on the true story of the disappearance of Tom and Eileen Lonergan. The first entry of the Open Water film series. The film follows an American couple who go scuba diving while on vacation, only to find themselves stranded miles from shore in shark-filled waters when the crew of their boat accidentally leaves them behind.

The film was financed by the husband and wife team of writer/director Chris Kentis and producer Laura Lau, both avid scuba divers. It cost $500,000 to make and was bought by Lions Gate Entertainment for $2.5 million after its screening at the Sundance Film Festival. Lions Gate spent a further $8 million on distribution and marketing. The film ultimately grossed $55.5 million worldwide (including $30 million from the North American box office alone).

== Plot ==
To spend more time together as a couple, Daniel Kintner and Susan Watkins go on a vacation to the Caribbean. On their second day, Daniel and Susan book a scuba diving excursion, setting out to sea on a commercial dive boat packed with other tourists.

Once underwater, Daniel and Susan briefly separate from the group to explore a deeper section of the coral reef. As they are exploring, the group returns to the boat. A series of minor distractions, including a tourist who climbs aboard but jumps back in the water to help another diver, causes the dive master to conduct an inaccurate headcount. Believing everyone is safely back on board, the boat returns to the mainland, accidentally leaving Daniel and Susan behind.

When the couple surfaces, they find the sea completely empty and realize the boat has departed. At first, they remain calm, assuming the crew will realize their mistake and turn the boat around to rescue them. As hours pass and strong water currents drifting them further out to sea, it dawns on Daniel and Susan that their boat is not coming back. While treading water, they face dehydration and sea sickness, a massive swarm of stinging jellyfish, the arrival of reef sharks circling them, and marital tension as each one blames one other for causing their predicament.

By afternoon, Susan sustains a small shark bite wound on her leg but does not notice it due to exhaustion and numbness. Daniel goes under, and discovers a small fish feeding on the exposed flesh of her bite wound. As Susan's wound leaks small amounts of blood, the sharks become more aggressive and bites Daniel on the calf, causing him to bleed profusely. Susan uses her weight belt as a makeshift tourniquet, before Daniel enters a state of shock.

At night during a severe thunderstorm, the sharks drawn by the scent of Daniel's blood return and attack him while Susan helplessly watches. The next morning, Daniel and Susan's belongings are finally noticed on the boat by a crew member. He realizes that they must have been left at the dive site, triggering a massive coast guard search for the couple.

Susan is left entirely alone, and drifting in the open sea. She looks beneath the surface and sees several large sharks circling underneath her. Accepting the reality that Daniel is dead, Susan releases him into the water, where the swarming sharks devour him in a feeding frenzy. With no rescue boats anywhere on sight, and to avoid being eaten alive, Susan removes her scuba gear and drowns herself.

Sometime later, a fishing crew cuts open a newly caught shark's stomach, finding a diving camera, apparently that of Daniel and Susan. A fisherman offhandedly says "Wonder if it works."

== Cast ==
- Blanchard Ryan as Susan Watkins
- Daniel Travis as Daniel Kintner
- Saul Stein as Seth
- Michael E. Williamson as Davis
- Cristina Zenato as Linda
- John Charles as Junior
- Estelle Lau as Affected-Ear Diver

== Production ==
The filmmakers used live sharks, as opposed to the mechanical ones used in Jaws or the computer-generated fish in Deep Blue Sea. The film strives for authentic shark behavior, shunning the stereotypical exaggerated shark behavior typical of many films. The movie was shot on digital video. As noted above, the real-life events that inspired this story took place in the southern Pacific Ocean, and this film moves the location to the Atlantic Ocean, being filmed in The Bahamas, the United States Virgin Islands, the Grenadines, and Mexico.

During the audition, Chris Kentis and Laura Lau made it clear to Blanchard Ryan and Daniel Travis there was going to be nudity in the film and that it was non-negotiable. "So it was odd, you know, I was like 'okay, that's fine' and I hadn't been offered the part or anything yet, and then when I was offered the part, that had already been negotiated," said Blanchard.

== Reception ==
Open Water received mostly positive reviews. On Rotten Tomatoes, the film has an approval rating of 71% based on 196 reviews with an average rating of 6.57/10. The consensus reads: "A low-budget thriller with some intense moments." On Metacritic, the film holds a score of 63 out of 100, based on reviews from 38 critics' reviews, indicating "generally favorable reviews".

Most critics praised the film for its intensity and minimalist filmmaking, although it was not as well-received by audiences. Writing in the Chicago Sun-Times, Roger Ebert praised the film highly: "Rarely, but sometimes, a movie can have an actual physical effect on you. It gets under your defenses and sidesteps the 'it's only a movie' reflex and creates a visceral feeling that might as well be real". In a much less favorable review, A. O. Scott in The New York Times lamented that it "succeeds in mobilizing the audience's dread, but it fails to make us care as much as we should about the fate of its heroes".

=== Box office ===
Open Water was produced for $120,000, and grossed $1 million in 47 theaters on its opening weekend. Its final worldwide gross is $54.7 million.

=== Accolades ===
Award	Category	Subject	Result
31st Saturn Awards	Best Horror or Thriller Film	N/A	Nominated
31st Saturn Awards	Best Actress	Blanchard Ryan	Won
Fangoria Chainsaw Awards	Best Actress	Blanchard Ryan	Nominated
Fangoria Chainsaw Awards	Best Wide-Release Film	N/A	Nominated
Fangoria Chainsaw Awards	Worst Film	N/A	Nominated
Golden Trailer Awards	Best Thriller	N/A	Won
Golden Trailer Awards	Best Independent	N/A	Nominated

== Sequels ==
In 2006, a film marketed as a sequel titled Open Water 2: Adrift was released, although its plot is unrelated to Open Water. A third film in the series titled, Open Water 3: Cage Dive was released in 2017, following the first film's plot of being a survival shark film, although unrelated story-wise.

== See also ==
- Survival film, about the film genre, with a list of related films
- Low budget film
- List of killer shark films
