= Laura Lau =

American writer, director, and producer (born 1963)

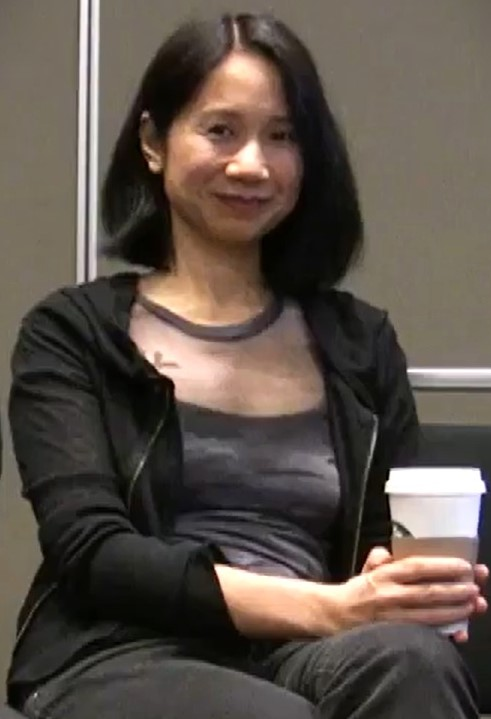
- Laura Lau in 2012
- Born: March 31, 1963 (age 62); San Francisco, California, U.S.
- Occupation(s): Film director, producer, screenwriter
- Spouse: Chris Kentis (m. 1997)
- Children: 1

Laura Lau (simplified Chinese: 劳拉·刘; traditional Chinese: 勞拉·劉; born March 31, 1963) is an American writer, director, and producer, perhaps best known as the writer of the films Open Water (2005) and Silent House (2011), the latter of which she co-directed with Chris Kentis.

== Biography ==
On March 31, 1963, Lau was born as Laura J. Lau in San Francisco, California, U.S. Lau's parents are Chinese-American.

Lau studied writing at Barnard College.

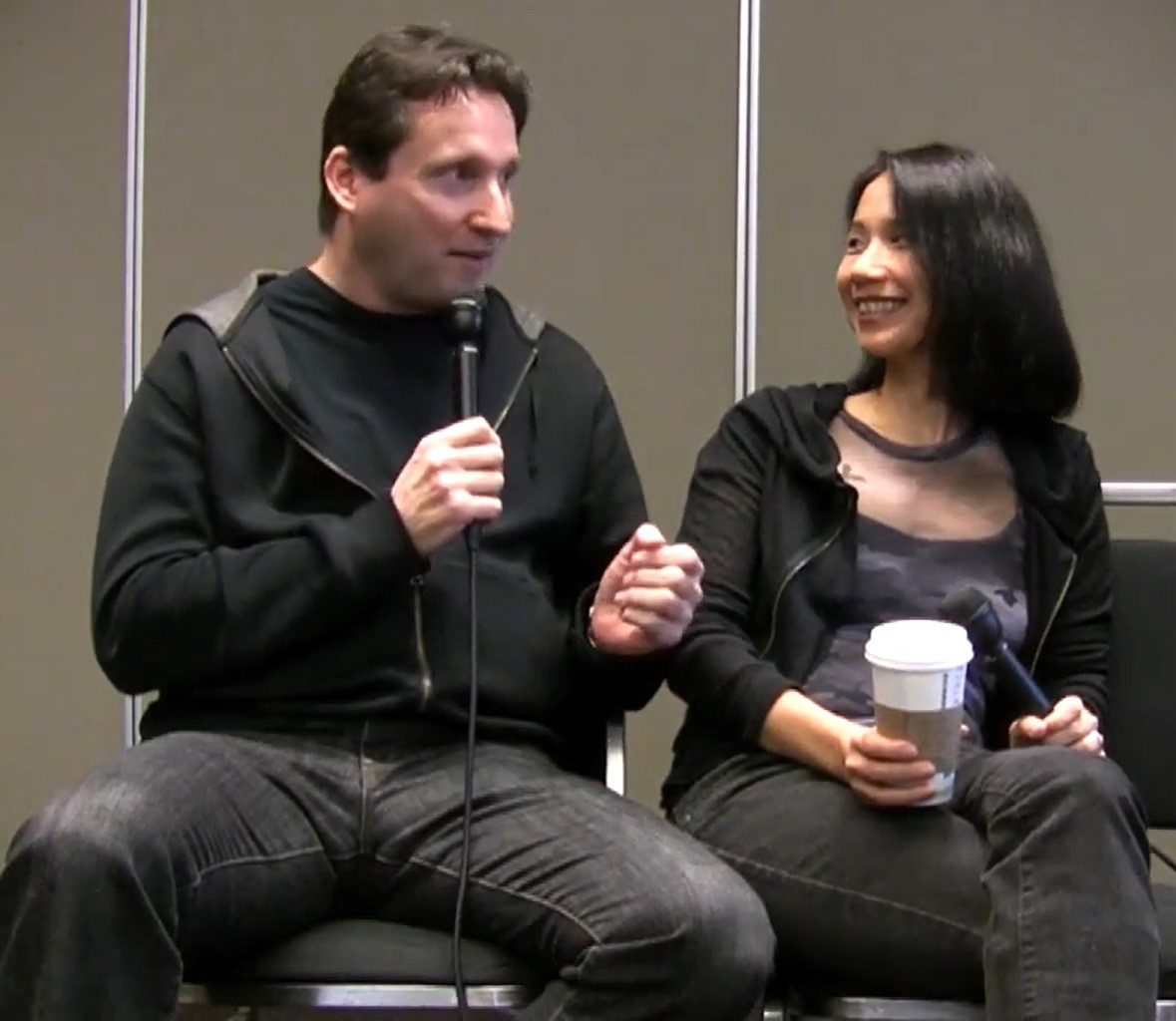
Chris Kentis and Laura Lau in 2012

Lau's first feature, Grind (1997), was written by her and directed by Chris Kentis. She would co-produce and shoot Open Water in 2003, on a budget of $120,000; the film would go on to gross $58.7 million worldwide. Her third feature, Silent House (2011), was co-directed, written, and produced by Lau, along with Kentis.

Lau was married to Kentis, her film collaborator, in 1997. They have one daughter.

== Filmography ==
Year	Title	Director	Writer	Producer	Notes
1997	Grind	No	Yes	Yes	Also assistant editor
2003	Open Water	No	No	Yes	Also cinematographer
2011	Silent House	Yes	Yes	Yes	Co-directed with Chris Kentis
