= Deep Blue Sea 3 =

2020 science-fiction horror comedy film

- Official DVD/Blu-ray cover
- Directed by: John Pogue
- Written by: Dirk Blackman
- Produced by: Tom Keniston; Hunt Lowry; Patty Reed
- Starring: Tania Raymonde; Nathaniel Buzolic; Emerson Brooks
- Cinematography: Michael Swan
- Edited by: Eric Strand
- Music by: Mark Kilian
- Production companies: Roserock Films; Film Afrika Worldwide
- Distributed by: Warner Bros. Home Entertainment
- Release date: July 28, 2020
- Running time: 99 minutes
- Country: United States
- Language: English

Deep Blue Sea 3 is a 2020 American science fiction natural horror film directed by John Pogue and starring Tania Raymonde. Dr. Emma Collins and her team are on Little Happy Island studying the effect of climate change on great white sharks who come to the nearby nursery every year to give birth, their peaceful life is disrupted when a "scientific" team shows up looking for three bull sharks. Deep Blue Sea 3 was released direct-to-video by Warner Bros. Home Entertainment on July 28, 2020. It is the third and final installment of the Deep Blue Sea film series, and a direct sequel to Deep Blue Sea 2.

== Plot ==
Dr. Emma Collins continues the work of her deceased father Nick on climate change and the protection of great white sharks on an artificial island, flooded by rising sea levels, near South Africa named Little Happy. Her team includes Spinnaker (nicknamed "Spinn"), Miya, and Eugene Shaw, Nick's best friend and brother figure to Emma. Also living on Little Happy are Emma's friends Nandi and her brother Bahari. Bella, a bull shark who was responsible for the chaos in the past years, is found dead, having been killed after getting stuck in fishing lines, discovered by Dr. Richard Lowell, Emma's ex-boyfriend, and his team on their boat, the Thasos. They go to Little Happy to find the three last pups of Bella are now adults, and are the only survivors from the litter.

When Richard and his team dive to chase the bull sharks, Emma goes with them and discovers three great white sharks devoured by the bull sharks. Soon after, Brown, a member of Richard's team, is found dead, having been sliced in half by the bull sharks, which are theorized to be adapting to climate change by becoming more aggressive. With Emma's help, one of the biggest bull sharks is sedated and captured but Richard is injured.

Later, Bahari goes fishing but is attacked and devoured by one of the two remaining bulls. Nandi later discovers his severed arm. After the loss of her friend, Emma confronts Richard. He reveals to her that these bull sharks are more intelligent, telling the events of the first two movies. He says that with the beacon which was attached to their mother, he can attract her offspring as they know that their mother is dead. He concludes in saying that if these sharks reproduce, it will be a catastrophe. Lucas, leader of the mercenaries of Genotic Labs, overthrows Richard's command and decides to kill everyone and flee with the captured shark. They place a mine to blow everything up, unaware that Emma and her team is spying on them with an underwater drone.

Emma confronts Richard again, accusing him of planning to murder them. Lucas, having overheard their conversation, attacks them and Emma's team, causing massive damage to nearby structures on the island with explosives. During the battle, Emma escapes, but Richard is captured by Schill and Earls, Lucas' men, and brought to the Thasos.

After choosing Emma's side, Richard is killed by one of the sharks as he jumps from the boat to join her. Earls is killed by a bull shark while he fights with Shaw. Meanwhile, Spinn is killed by a bull shark and Miya is presumed to suffer the same fate. Emma deactivates the mine but is attacked by Schill, who has been instructed by Lucas to kill her. She is saved by Sally, the great white shark, "friend" of Emma since her arrival on Little Happy, who devours Schill. Emma places the mine on the Thasos and when Lucas explodes it, his boat sinks which frees the captured shark.

Shaw sacrifices himself to kill two of the three bull sharks with explosive darts. Lucas, having survived the recent explosion, attacks Emma, but is killed by her and Nandi. Emma then kills the last bull shark by luring it into the garbage compactor. Nandi and Emma flee, leaving Little Happy destroyed, with Sally addressing a goodbye to Emma before disappearing into the ocean. While Nandi and Emma navigate, they find a wardrobe and Miya is revealed alive, having hidden inside it. Reunited, the three friends go back to civilization.

== Cast ==
- Tania Raymonde as Dr. Emma Collins
- Nathaniel Buzolic as Dr. Richard Lowell
- Emerson Brooks as Eugene Shaw
- Bren Foster as Lucas
- Alex Bhat as Spinnaker
- Reina Aoi as Miya
- Siya Mayola as Bahari
- Avumile Qongqo as Nandi
- Brashaad Mayweather as Brown
- Ernest St.Clair as Schill
- DeVille Vannik as Earls

== Production ==
Work began on the film in the summer of 2019. The film wrapped production in May 2020.

== Release ==
=== Home media ===
The film was released on July 28, 2020, on Digital HD by Warner Bros. Home Entertainment, and was released on Blu-ray and DVD on August 25.

== Reception ==
=== Critical response ===
On Rotten Tomatoes the film has an approval rating of 73% based on reviews from 15 critics, with an average rating of 5.6/10. Meagan Navarro of Bloody Disgusting expressed that while the film cannot be considered good by conventional standards, it was nonetheless enjoyable.

== See also ==
- List of killer shark films
- List of underwater science fiction works
