= Chris Kentis =

American film director and screenwriter

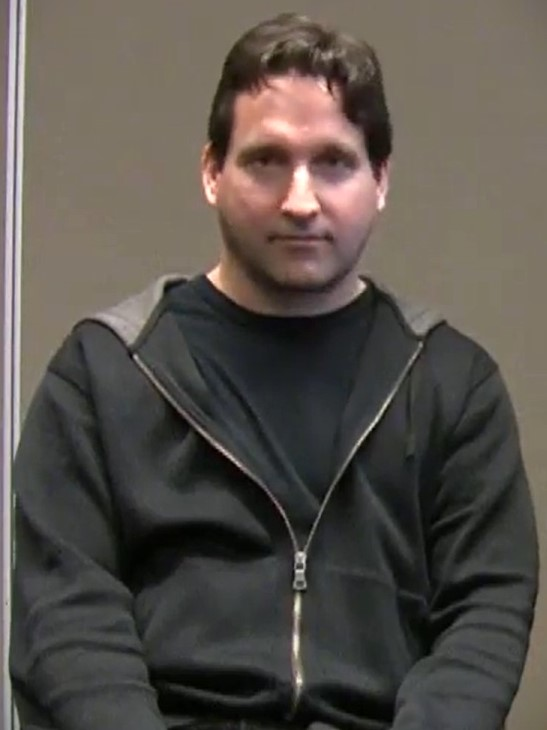
- Kentis in 2012
- Born: New York, United States
- Occupations: Film director, screenwriter
- Children: 1

Chris Kentis is an American film director and screenwriter.

== Career ==
Kentis made his feature directorial debut with Grind (1997), starring Billy Crudup and Amanda Peet, which he co-wrote with his wife Laura Lau and also edited. He wrote, directed and edited Open Water (2003), which he based on a true story he had first heard about in diving circles as a vacation scuba diver. He and Lau shot the film themselves in the Bahamas, with Kentis operating the underwater camera among real sharks. The film premiered at the Sundance Film Festival and became one of the most profitable low-budget films of all time. Kentis and Lau later co-directed Silent House (2011), starring Elizabeth Olsen, which also premiered at Sundance and was released by Open Road Films; Kentis has also worked as an award-winning producer and editor of film trailers.

== Personal life ==
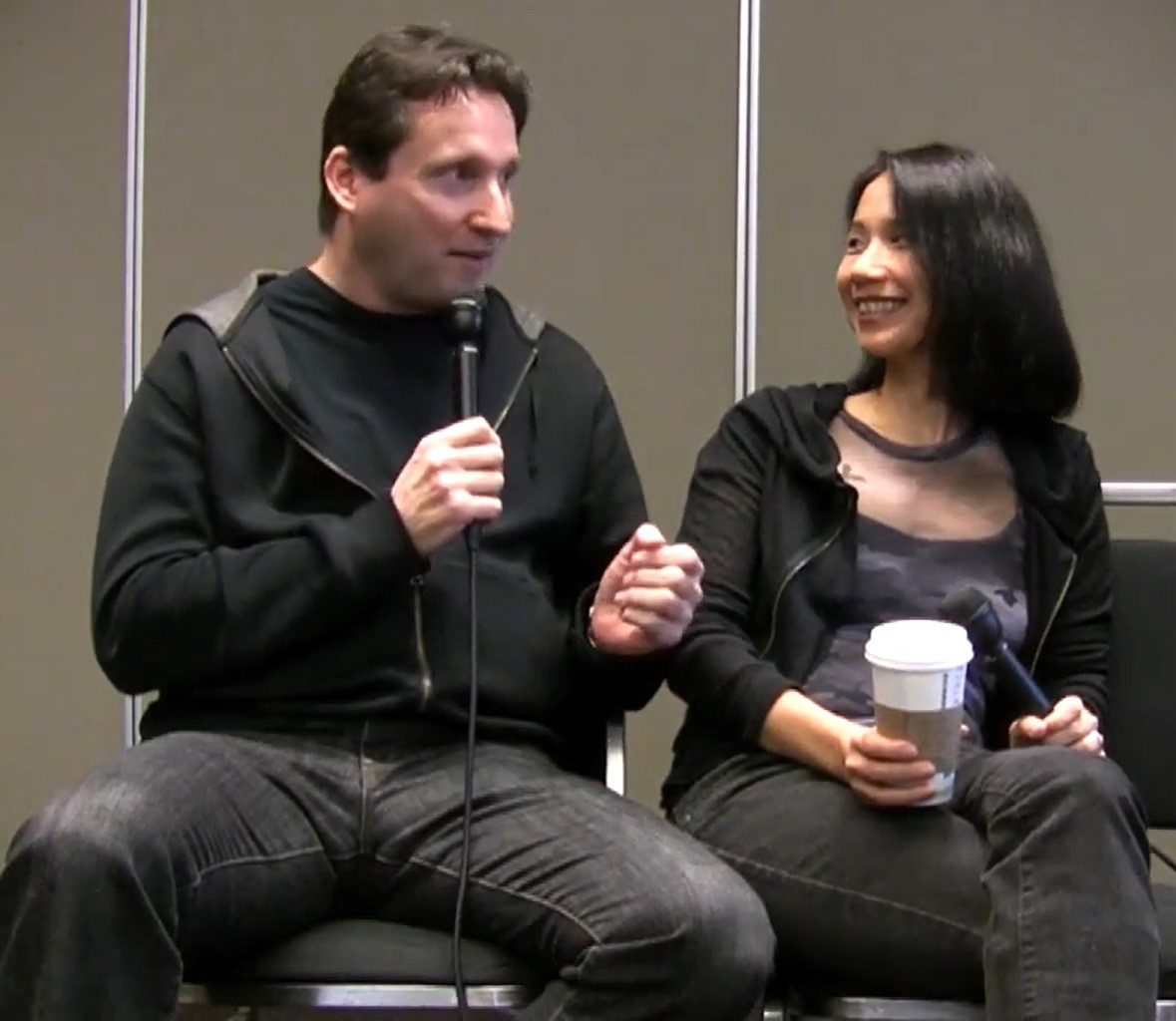
Kentis and Laura Lau in 2012

He was married to co-director Laura Lau. They have one daughter.

== Filmography ==
Year	Title	Director	Writer	Editor	Notes	Ref.
1997	Grind	Yes	Yes	Yes	Also made a cameo as "Factory Worker"	
2003	Open Water	Yes	Yes	Yes	Also cinematographer	
2011	Silent House	Yes	No	No	Co-directed with Laura Lau	
