= John Pogue =

American filmmaker

- Occupations: Film director, film producer, screenwriter
- Years active: 1998–present

John Pogue is an American filmmaker. He is an alumnus of Yale University.

== Filmography ==
=== Film ===
Year	Title	Writer	Producer	Director
1998	U.S. Marshals	Yes	No	No
2000	The Skulls	Yes	Yes	No
2001	The Fast and the Furious	No	Executive	No
2002	Rollerball	Yes	No	No
2002	The Skulls II	No	Yes	No
2002	Ghost Ship	Yes	No	No
2004	The Skulls III	No	Yes	No
2011	Quarantine 2: Terminal	Yes	No	Yes
2014	The Quiet Ones	Yes	No	Yes
2018	Blood Brother	No	No	Yes
2020	Deep Blue Sea 3	No	No	Yes
2022	Eraser: Reborn	No	No	Yes
TBA	Cabo	No	No	Yes

Other credits

Year	Title	Role
2000	The Skulls	Second Unit Director

Uncredited revisions

- Eraser (1996)
- Shadow Conspiracy (1997)
- The Fast and the Furious (2001)

=== Unmade projects ===
Year	Title	Role	Notes	Production Status	Ref.
1995	Man With a Football	Writer		N/A	
1995	The Damocles Network	Writer		N/A	
1996	The Driver	Writer	Remake of the 1978 film of the same name	Unmade	
1996	Force 21	Writer		N/A	
2001	Nightfall	Director	Based on an original script by Dennis Lehane	N/A	
2002	Altered Carbon	Writer	Based on the 2002 novel of the same name by Richard K. Morgan.	Unmade	
2003	Extractors	Writer	Based on an original script by James DeMonaco and Kevin Fox	N/A	
2004	Delilah	Writer, Producer		N/A	
2006	Maléfique	Writer	Remake of the 2002 film of the same name	N/A	
2008	Burnout	Writer	Based on a script by Tony Peckham	N/A	
2013	Ciudad	Director	Based on a graphic novel by Joe Russo, Anthony Russo, Ande Parks and Fernando Leon	Unmade, later filmed as Extraction	
2016	~~Wake~~	Director	Screenplay written by Christopher Borrelli	Cancelled	
2016	Walkaway Joe	Director	N/A	Unmade	
2017	Brodie’s Law: Project Jameson	Director	Based on the comic book series by David Bircham and Daley Osiyemi	In Development	
2021	What’s In it For Me?	Writer, Producer	Based on a novel by Joseph Stedino and Dary Matera	In Development	
