= Open Water 2: Adrift =

2006 film by Hans Horn

- Theatrical release poster
- Directed by: Hans Horn
- Written by: Adam Kreutner; David Mitchell
- Based on: "Adrift" by Koji Suzuki
- Produced by: Dan Maag; Philip Schulz-Deyle
- Starring: Susan May Pratt; Richard Speight, Jr.; Niklaus Lange; Ali Hillis; Cameron Richardson; Eric Dane
- Cinematography: Bernhard Jasper
- Edited by: Christian Lonk
- Music by: Gerd Baumann
- Production companies: Summit Entertainment; Universum Film; Orange Pictures; Peter Rommel Productions; Shotgun Pictures; FilmFernsehFonds Bayern
- Distributed by: Universum Film
- Release dates: 10 July 2006 (Cambridge); 10 August 2006 (Germany)
- Running time: 95 minutes
- Country: Germany
- Language: English
- Budget: $1.2 million
- Box office: $6.8 million

Open Water 2: Adrift (also known simply as Adrift or Open Water 2) is a 2006 German English-language survival film directed by Hans Horn, starring Susan May Pratt, Richard Speight, Jr., Niklaus Lange, Ali Hillis, Cameron Richardson. and Eric Dane. Second entry of the Open Water film series, it was inspired by the short story "Adrift" by Japanese author Koji Suzuki, from which it took its original title, but promotional posters claimed the film is based on actual events.

The film has no connection to Open Water (2003) and the script had been written before it was theatrically released. After Open Water became a success, Adrift was produced and the name was changed to Open Water 2: Adrift.

== Plot ==
A group of friends, Amy (Susan May Pratt), James (Richard Speight, Jr.), Zach (Niklaus Lange), Lauren (Ali Hillis), Dan (Eric Dane), and Dan's new girlfriend, Michelle (Cameron Richardson), go for a weekend cruise on Dan's new yacht. Amy and James also bring their infant daughter, Sarah.

Most of the friends decide to jump into the water for a swim, except Amy and Dan, who are still on board with the baby. Amy is tending to her daughter, Sarah, and puts her down for a nap. Amy then puts her life jacket, which she refuses to take off while on board, back on. Amy is aquaphobic after a childhood traumatic event – as a young child, her father drowned while they were swimming together. Amy and Dan talk about her fear, but while he is talking he scoops her into his arms, and as she screams, jumps into the water. The group realizes that nobody has lowered the ladder, leaving them unable to re-board the ship. Despite their efforts, the side of the yacht is too smooth to climb and the deck is too high to reach. They see a boat of teenagers heading towards them, but as the group tries to grab their attention, the teenagers think that they are just greeting them, and sail off. The group hears a phone ringing from Zach's clothes hanging slightly off the deck of the boat; however, the clothes fall into the water as Dan reaches for them. The phone is soaking, and as Zach tries to answer it, they hear the voices of some birthday singers, but are unable to respond. The phone goes dead, and Zach angrily throws the phone into the ocean. Michelle screams and tries to retrieve it, but it is lost.

They are left to tread water disconsolately. The group resorts to removing and using their bathing suits to make a rope. After a couple of attempts they manage to get one end of the rope wrapped around a railing. Instead of having the lightest person climb up, the heavier Zach attempts to climb. He pulls himself up and his fingers brush the gunwale but the makeshift rope rips apart as he is too heavy. The group are now mostly naked and have only a partial swimsuit rope.

Meanwhile, James goes underwater, and messes with the prop, in an attempt to remove it and use it, but he drops the knife. He swims down after it and manages to catch it, then panicking under water, tries to swim for the surface. As he swims back up he crashes into the bottom of the boat, and is knocked unconscious. He resurfaces motionless with blood trickling out his head with an obvious skull fracture. Zach gets the knife from James and starts stabbing the boat to climb back up. Dan tries to stop him, they get in a fight and Dan causes Zach to stab himself in the chest.

Fearing that sharks will be attracted by the blood, the now hysterical Michelle begins to swim away, but sinks underwater. Dan swims after her and sees her lifeless body drifting underwater. He dives after her, but cannot reach her, and her body disappears into the depths. After some time, Zach dies from blood loss in Lauren's arms. She reluctantly lets go of his body which floats away, face down. Out of guilt, Dan admits that he does not own the yacht. After much waiting, Lauren says she refuses to die treading water and attempts to swim back to shore to find help. Her fate after this is unknown.

Later that night, during a rainstorm, James dies from his head injury. Dan unsuccessfully searches underwater for the knife. He slams his mask on the hull in frustration and the lens pops out. Remembering Zach's attempt with the knife, Dan uses it to wedge in the crevice of the side door for the ladder, giving him a handhold. Amy climbs over his shoulders, finally stepping onto his hand wrapped around the lens, causing him to scream as his hand bleeds more, and manages to grab the gunwale and pull herself back on board. Once on board, she lowers the ramp steps for Dan and tends to her daughter, Sarah. Amy notices Dan swimming away to drown out of guilt. She jumps back in to save him, reminding her of when she attempted to save her father in the same manner.

The next morning, a fishing boat approaches the yacht, and notices the lowered ladder and life ring still floating in the water – no one had pulled them in. The yacht appears empty except for the sound of Sarah, Amy's daughter, crying on the lower deck.

The film cuts to Amy standing on the boat in the sun, looking around appearing heartbroken. Dan is shown lying face down on the boat's deck, seemingly either sleeping or dead.

== Cast ==
- Susan May Pratt as Amy
  - Alexandra Raach as Young Amy
- Richard Speight Jr. as James
- Niklaus Lange as Zach
- Ali Hillis as Lauren
- Cameron Richardson as Michelle
- Eric Dane as Dan
- Mattea Gabarreta and Christine Gabarratta as Baby Sarah
- Wolfgang Raach as Amy's Father

== Release ==
The film was released on DVD by Lionsgate on 20 February 2007. The film debuted on the Blu-ray format on 31 August 2010, in a double feature with the first Open Water (2003) film.

== Reception ==
=== Critical response ===
Open Water 2: Adrift received mixed reviews from critics. On review aggregator Rotten Tomatoes, the film holds an approval rating of 45% based on 11 reviews, with an average rating of 4.39/10.

=== Box office ===
In the United Kingdom, the film opened at 327 theaters, grossing £337,474, averaging £1,033 per theater. 123 theaters dropped the film for the second weekend, and its ticket sales declined by 75 percent, making £85,541, averaging £419. During the third weekend, the film's sales tumbled 90 percent after 183 more theaters dropped it, making £8,896. The fourth weekend brought an additional 64 percent decline, and the film lost 13 theaters, while grossing £3,198.

In Germany, the film's opening weekend brought €293,601, averaging €3,764 at 78 theaters. During the second weekend in Germany, the film grossed €121,997, averaging €1,564 at 78 theaters.

In Spain, the film's opening weekend earned €270,396, averaging €1,767 at 153 theaters. During the second weekend, the film grossed €139,503. In Spain, the film grossed at least €713,834.

== Sequel ==
In 2017, Lionsgate acquired the Australian-produced independent film Cage Dive, a found-footage shark-attack film, and released it as Open Water 3: Cage Dive. The film is a sequel in thematic elements only and shares no characters or continuity to the previous two entries.
