= Disappearance of Tom and Eileen Lonergan =

Couple abandoned and lost at sea

Tom and Eileen Lonergan
- Photo of Tom and Eileen Lonergan
- Born: Thomas Joseph Lonergan; Eileen Cassidy Hains (Tom) 28 December 1964; (Eileen) 3 March 1969; Louisiana, U.S.
- Disappeared: 25 January 1998; (Tom, aged 33), (Eileen, aged 28); Coral Sea
- Known for: Abandonment and subsequent disappearance in the Coral Sea

Thomas Joseph Lonergan (born 28 December 1964) and Eileen Cassidy Lonergan (née Hains; born 3 March 1969) were an American couple who were abandoned in the Coral Sea off Australia's northeast coast on 25 January 1998 during a group scuba-diving trip aboard MV Outer Edge. The boat crew did not note their absences until two days later. While search efforts resulted in the discovery of personal effects confirmed to be those of the Lonergans, they were never found.

The couple's disappearance resulted in "a crisis of confidence in north Queensland's dive industry" and tighter mandatory safety regulations for diving boats in Australia. Their disappearance served as the inspiration for the 2003 film Open Water.

== Background ==
Thomas Joseph Lonergan and Eileen Hains, both graduates of Louisiana State University, were married in Jefferson, Texas on 24 June 1988.

== Disappearance ==
On January 25, 1998, the Lonergans were scuba diving with a group at St. Crispin's Reef in Australia's Great Barrier Reef. The boat that had transported the group to the dive site departed before the Lonergans returned from the water. None of the vessel's crew or passengers noticed that the two had not returned to the boat.

The couple had recently completed a two-year tour of duty with the Peace Corps at Funafuti atoll in the South Pacific island nation of Tuvalu and were repeating that work in Fiji.

== Investigations and trial ==
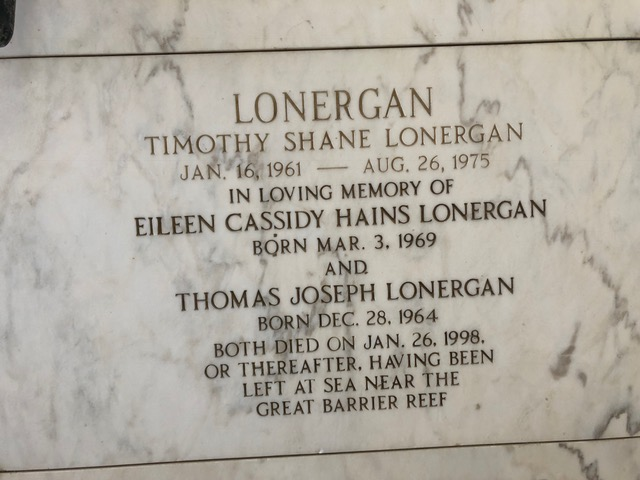
Lonergan memorial plaque.

The couple was not discovered to be missing until 27 January 1998, two days after their dive when a bag containing their belongings was found onboard the boat. An air and sea search took place over the following three days.

In February 1998, a women's wetsuit of Eileen Lonergan's size washed ashore in north Queensland. Examination of barnacle growth on the wetsuit determined it had likely been submerged in the ocean since January. It bore tears along the buttocks and armpit areas, presumed by examiners to have resulted from contact with coral. Their bodies were never recovered.

Several theories regarding the couple's disappearance were suggested, including that the Lonergans might have staged their disappearance, despite the fact that their bank accounts were never touched, and their insurance policies were not claimed.

Excerpts from Tom Lonergan's diary suggested a man looking for a "quick and peaceful" death. Eileen's writings expressed her choice to stay with Tom, no matter the outcome. According to Eileen's parents and family, the diary entries were taken out of context. The family, the coroner, Noel Nunan, and the Port Douglas police claim that only the pages that validate the suicide theory were leaked to the press, whereas the majority of the diaries remain unread except by the coroner, Port Douglas police, and the Hains family.

In June 1998, six months after the disappearance, more of the couple's diving gear was found washed ashore on a Port Douglas beach, approximately 75 miles (121 km) from where they were lost. Among these items were inflatable dive jackets marked with the Lonergans' names, along with their compressed air tanks and one of Eileen's fins. Also recovered was a weathered diver's slate (a device used for communicating underwater) that read: "Monday Jan 26; 1998 08am. To anyone who can help us: We have been abandoned on A[gin]court Reef by MV Outer Edge 25 Jan 1998 3pm. Please help to rescue us before we die. Help!!!"

Eileen's father, John Hains, suspected that the couple ultimately became dehydrated and disoriented, and either drowned or were attacked by sharks. During the inquest, experts speculated that based on the state of the gear recovered, the couple had likely not experienced an animal attack but rather succumbed to delirium resulting from dehydration, which caused them to remove their diving outfits voluntarily. Without the buoyancy provided by their gear, the couple would have been unable to tread water for long and would have soon drowned.

The coroner dismissed suggestions that the Lonergans had died by suicide or faked their disappearance and formally charged Geoffrey Ian "Jack" Nairn, skipper of the dive boat, with their unlawful killing. He was found not guilty, but his company Outer Edge Dive was fined after pleading guilty to negligence, and closed down. Queensland's government also introduced stiffer regulations, including the requirement that captains and dive masters independently confirm passenger head counts.

== In media ==
- The Lonergans' disappearance was featured in an episode of American TV program 20/20.
- The American film Open Water (2003) was inspired by the Lonergans' disappearance; the film is set in the Caribbean and involves a couple who are abandoned at sea following an incorrect headcount; the couple are given fictitious names.

== See also ==
- List of people who disappeared mysteriously at sea
- Death of Suzanne Rees
