= Open Water 3: Cage Dive =

2017 film by Gerald Rascionato

- Theatrical release poster
- Directed by: Gerald Rascionato
- Screenplay by: Gerald Rascionato
- Story by: Gerald Rascionato; Stephen Lister
- Produced by: Charles M. Barsamian; Rana Joy Glickman; Jake Gray; Antoine Mouawad; Gerald Rascionato
- Starring: Joel Hogan; Megan Peta Hill; Josh Potthoff; Pete Valley
- Cinematography: Gerald Rascionato; Andy Bambach
- Edited by: Gerald Rascionato; Antoine Mouawad; Andre Stamatakakos
- Music by: The Newton Brothers
- Production company: Just One More Productions Pty. Ltd.
- Distributed by: Odin's Eye Entertainment
- Release date: 11 August 2017
- Running time: 80 minutes
- Country: Australia
- Language: English
- Box office: $836,413

Open Water 3: Cage Dive is a 2017 Australian found footage survival horror film directed and written by Gerald Rascionato, and released by Lionsgate. The third installment of the Open Water film series — although the film is a standalone sequel and only connects to the other films in theme, not continuity — the plot follows a trio of vacationing Americans in Australia who are filming an audition tape for an extreme reality TV show on a cage diving excursion. Before they know it, a rogue wave capsizes and sinks their boat leaving them stranded in the ocean. The film is presented as a mockumentary and perpetuated as true events; though most of the film is first person footage from the characters with time stamps throughout, in the vein of Paranormal Activity.

The film bears similarities to another 2017 shark attack survival film featuring a cage dive excursion gone wrong, 47 Meters Down. The method of "cage dive disaster" in each film differs with Cage Dive involving a rogue wave capsizing the boat while the former film sees a rusty winch break, trapping the protagonists underwater within the cage. The notable difference between these two films is that Cage Dive does not keep its protagonists within the cage, but rather leaves them in the open water among hungry sharks.

== Plot ==
A news story unfolds from 21 October 2015, about a shark cage diving boat in Australia that capsized; after several confirmed fatalities and others rescued, a search is underway for the last three missing passengers, tourists from Laguna Beach, California. One week later: A diver is swimming along a reef and finds an underwater camera wedged in some coral with its SD card preserved. The diver is interviewed by the filmmakers, explaining he uploaded the footage to social media after finding it belonging to the three Americans: Josh, his brother Jeff, and Jeff's girlfriend Megan, eventually getting ahold of Greg, Josh and Jeff's cousin who lives in Sydney.

On 18 October 2015, the trio arrives in Sydney, and meet Greg, who is hosting them for a few days before they fly to Adelaide for their shark cage dive. Over the course of their time together it is revealed Megan is having an affair with Josh.

The next day they board the boat and head out to sea. Finding the attention of several great white sharks with chum, passengers are allowed into the cage. When it is Jeff, Megan, and Josh's turn, they enter and a rogue wave capsizes the boat. They are able to escape the cage and reach the surface where a man is dead and bleeding heavily into the water; a girl is holding him and sobbing. As Josh tells her to get out of the bloody water, a shark breaches the surface and pulls them both under. Another passenger a little further away from them calls out and swims for them but is attacked by two great whites. After some time in the water without the sharks around, Josh sees a boat but it is too far to swim to. They notice some bloody tissue in the water nearby and a great white attacks it, causing them to panic, but it swims away. Several hours after capsizing they come across a couple of tangled life preservers and are able to use them for support. Jeff, who has a heart condition requiring regular medication, begins to grow weaker and fade in and out of consciousness.

Around 6:00 p.m., Jeff spots an ice chest floating toward them and swims toward it. As he does, a dorsal fin breaches the surface nearby and the shark attacks the chest, causing Jeff to swim back to the others. With the sun setting, they turn the camera off to conserve battery for its night vision capabilities. Around 11:30 p.m., Josh turns the camera on, hearing a noise. The night vision picks up an object floating nearby. Jeff swims to it and finds it is an inflatable 4-person emergency raft. They inflate it and inside they find some provisions, lighting off a flare. At about 1:00 a.m., Megan records a video confession while the brothers are sleeping but something knocks against the raft, waking them. They spot a shark outside but Josh also spots a woman floating on some debris nearby and jumps in, pulling her back to the raft. They pull her aboard and find she is alive but unconscious and likely suffering from hypothermia. Megan and Josh argue about using a flare and accidentally light it. Josh, Megan, and Jeff jump overboard as the flare ignites the raft, killing the survivor still inside. The group starts arguing, inadvertently exposing Josh and Megan's affair. Jeff starts to swim off on his own when a shark bumps against Megan's leg, causing her to panic. She swims towards Jeff and is pulled under the water by the shark. Josh sees her crushed dive mask float up to the surface temporarily.

7:33 a.m. on 22 October: Jeff is now filming, antagonizing Josh on camera, intentionally trying to make him feel bad for the death of Megan. As their arguing escalates, Jeff loses consciousness due to his heart condition and lack of medication. 9:30 a.m.: Josh lets Jeff's now lifeless body sink, unable to carry him anymore. 10:30 a.m.: With the battery almost dead, Josh films his final moments until he sees a rescue helicopter in the distance. As he splashes and calls out, the camera dips below the surface in time to capture a great white swimming up to attack Josh from below. As he is pulled underwater, the camera dies.

== Cast ==
- Joel Hogan as Jeff Miller
- Josh Potthoff as Josh Miller
- Megan Peta Hill as Megan Murphy
- Pete Valley as Greg

== Production ==
The film was produced independently and filmed in Australia by Just One More Productions Pty. Ltd. It also saw the return of sharks a main threat to the characters (something that was absent from the second film in the series) although still held true to the "open water" theme. Open Water 3: Cage Dive holds the distinction of being the first shark film to be shot entirely from a first person point of view. Director Gerald Rascionato originally titled the film 'Cage Dive' and had not intended it as a sequel to the Open Water films. When asked about his inspiration for the film, Rascionato cited Jaws as a major influence but he also expressed enthusiasm for originality, which is what drove him to the "found footage" genre. He stated further that he felt it "important to focus on the characters so that you feel for them as you go on their journey, all the while tactically using visual effects as a device to help tell the story" and tried to incorporate that into this film.

== Release ==
The film was acquired by Lionsgate for distribution in the beginning of 2017. Lionsgate soon rebranded the film as part of the Open Water film series due to the success of Open Water 2: Adrift, which was also an independent production rebranded after completion as a sequel to the Chris Kentis' hit 2003 film. Once the trailer was rebranded with the updated "Open Water 3" moniker, it was announced for a multi-platform release on 11 August 2017, in international box office markets. It also saw a home video release on DVD and Blu-ray as well as on demand markets and also some airlines.

== Reception ==
On Rotten Tomatoes the film has a score of 25% based on reviews from 8 critics. Out of the 8 reviews held on the website, 5 are from Spanish-language critics, likely due to Mexico making up well over half of the film's international box office gross according to one source.

Starburst Magazine published a positive review of the film in 2017. Written by Andrew Pollard, the review begins by criticizing the cover art for featuring a misleading "overblown megalodon-esque shark", shoehorning it in with the likes of other low budget shark creature features despite the film proving to be "a tense, gripping and engaging shark effort". Pollard also praises the performances, calling them "mostly well delivered" and writer/director/producer Gerald Rascionato for his ability to "capture the erratic, terrifying, nail-biting action as it develops". Overall he awards the film 7/10, one that "could well prove to be one of 2017’s best kept genre secrets".

Steve Barton at Dread Central reviewed the film shortly after its release in 2017. Comparing the film to its lackluster predecessor, Barton argues that "surprisingly, there's a good flick in there that's home to some excellent shark carnage...just not enough of it". According to this review, the worst aspect of the film was its reliance on many "first person/found footage tropes" that no longer seem original.

The film was critiqued at Divernet.com, "the biggest online resource for scuba divers" in a review by Steve Weinman originally published in Diver magazine in December 2017. The review makes reference to the ultra-low budget tactic used for the series and notes that it was likely profitable, although it criticised the film's portrayal of shark behavior. Weinman goes on to say that while he was entertained by the movie, he "couldn't in all conscience recommend such an exploitative film to a diving audience".

== See also ==
- List of killer shark films
- Low budget film
- Survival film, about the film genre, with a list of related films
