= Super Buddies (film) =

2013 film by Robert Vince

- Film poster
- Directed by: Robert Vince
- Written by: Anna McRoberts; Robert Vince
- Based on: Characters by Paul Tamasy; Aaron Mendelsohn; Kevin DiCicco; Robert Vince; Anna McRoberts
- Produced by: Anna McRoberts; Robert Vince
- Starring: John Ratzenberger; Michael Teigen^{2}; Trey Loney; Veronica Diaz-Carranza; Jay Brazeau; Jason Earles; John Michael Higgins; Tim Conway; Colin Hanks; Jeremy Shinder; Cooper Roth; G. Hannelius; Ty Panitz; Tenzing Trainor; Maulik Pancholy; Chris Coppola; Amy Sedaris; Debra Jo Rupp; Alyson Stoner; Zendaya; Atticus Shaffer; Brian T. Finney; Tatiana Gudegast; Fiona Gubelmann
- Cinematography: Mark Irwin
- Edited by: Kelly Herron
- Music by: Brahm Wenger
- Production company: Key Pix Productions
- Distributed by: Walt Disney Studios Home Entertainment (Note: Released through the Walt Disney Pictures banner.)
- Release date: August 27, 2013
- Running time: 81 minutes
- Country: United States
- Language: English

Super Buddies is a 2013 American superhero comedy film. It is the seventh installment in the Air Buddies film series and the fourteenth of the Air Bud franchise. It was released by Walt Disney Studios Home Entertainment on August 27, 2013.

== Plot ==
One year after the events of the previous film, Bartleby and his dog Budderball are spending the summer at the farm of Bartleby's grandfather Marvin. On Bartleby's twelfth birthday, Marvin gives him the first issue of the comic book Kid Courageous and Captain Canine, which details the origin of the superhero Captain Canine. He comes from the planet of Inspiron, which was peaceful until the alien warlord Drex invaded, seeking to steal the Rings of Inspiron. The soldier Captain Megasis was tasked with taking the Rings to Earth despite Queen Jorala's reluctance. While doing so, he was attacked by Drex. In the ensuing battle, Drex was seemingly killed and Megasis safely landed on Earth with the Rings.

While celebrating his birthday with his friends, Bartleby's dogs find the Rings in a barn. When they return, Bartleby tells them the story of Captain Canine. After he landed in suburban Seattle, Megasis took the form of a dog to hide from the police and began searching for the Rings. While doing so, he met a boy named Jack and the two began fighting crime as Kid Courageous and Captain Canine, with Jack adapting their adventures into comic form.

The next day, Captain Canine detects the Rings' energy source and he and a now grown-up Jack begin tracking the Rings along with Drex, who is revealed to have survived. Upon discovering that the Rings have given them superpowers—super speed for Rosebud, invisibility for Mudbud, super strength for Budderball, flexibility for B-Dawg, and telekinesis for Buddha—the dogs decide to use their powers for good.

Meanwhile, Drex lands near Marvin's farm, possesses a pig, and begins searching for the Rings. Marvin discovers this and calls Sheriff Dan but the sheriff does not believe what he saw. Dan leaves to investigate a call from dispatch that Drex has stolen Marvin's truck and crashed it into city hall, during which he captures and arrests Drex. While Bartleby and the children discover the pod and conclude that Drex has arrived, the dogs save a girl from a house fire with help from Captain Canine, who teaches them to use their powers.

While the children learn of the dogs' heroics from the news, Drex swaps bodies with Dan and escapes from the police station, capturing the children after they arrive to try to meet with Dan. Drex arrives at Marvin's farm, locks the kids in a barn, and uses his pod's weapon systems to direct a meteor towards Fernfield which causes a Lightning storm over the town. Captain Canine faces off against Drex only to be killed but the Buddies use what they learned to overwhelm him, with some help from Marvin, who uses a lightning rod to electrocute Drex. This allows the dogs to escape and reunite with their owners at the barn, where Drex threatens to destroy them if they don't give him the Rings of Inspiron. After getting the Rings, he is confronted by Dan and Sniffer and gives the sheriff his body back before escaping. Drex later discovers the Rings of Inspiron he acquired were fake and loses control of his ship, which crashes into the meteor and kills him for good.

The Buddies use the Rings to resurrect Captain Canine, who returns to Inspiron with Drex's former assistant Monk-E, and Jorala after reverting to his true form. Afterwards, Jack and Bartleby create a new comic book series about the dogs.

== Cast ==
=== Live action ===
- John Ratzenberger as Marvin Livingstone
- Trey Loney as Bartleby Livingstone
- Veronica Diaz-Carranza as Sofia Ramirez
- Jay Brazeau as Mr. Swanson
- Jason Earles as Jack Schaeffer
- Jonathan Morgan Heit as Pete
- Harley Graham as Alice
- Darien Provost as Sam
- Sam Adler as Billy
- Michael Teigen as Sheriff Dan
- Jake Brennan as young Jack Schaeffer
- Kimberley Sustad as Joanne
- Sean Mathieson as Todd

=== Voice ===
- Cooper Roth as B-Dawg
- Jeremy Shinder as Budderball
- Tenzing Norgay Trainor as Buddha
- G. Hannelius as Rosebud
- Ty Panitz as Mudbud
- Colin Hanks as Megasis/Captain Canine
- Fiona Gubelmann as Princess Jorala
- John Michael Higgins as Drex
- Tim Conway as Deputy Sniffer
- Michael Teigen as Sheriff Dan
- Maulik Pancholy as Curly
- Chris Coppola as Mr. Bull
- Amy Sedaris as Betty
- Debra Jo Rupp as Cow
- Alyson Stoner as Strawberry
- Zendaya as Lollipop
- Atticus Shaffer as Monk-E
- Brian T. Finney as Dog
- Tatiana Gudegast as Cat
- Justin Roiland as Chihuahua

== Release ==
=== Home media ===
Super Buddies was released on DVD, Blu-ray, and as a film download on August 27, 2013. The physical release was produced in two different packages: a 2-disc Blu-ray / DVD combo pack and a 1-disc DVD. The film download was produced in both standard and high definition.

=== Streaming ===
Super Buddies became available to stream on Disney+ following its launch in 2019.
