= My American Dream =

Studio album by Neal E. Boyd
- Released: June 23, 2009
- Recorded: 2008–2009
- Genre: Classical, pop
- Length: 38:56
- Label: Decca
- Director: Pat Barry
- Producer: Simon Franglen

Singles from Neal E. Boyd
- 1. ""God Bless the USA"" Released: June 2, 2009

Professional ratings
Review scores
Source	Rating
AllMusic	3.5/5 stars
Billboard	Positive
Entertainment Weekly	Mixed
Artistdirect	3/5 stars

My American Dream is the sole studio album by Neal E. Boyd released on June 23, 2009. The album charted on the Billboard 200.

== Background ==
After Boyd won the third season of America's Got Talent, he was signed to Decca Records. Boyd explained that the name of the album reflects on how he met his dream after winning Talent. Songs included on the album are "God Bless the USA," "Ave Maria," "Amazing Grace," West Side Story's song "Somewhere," and his Talent winning song "Nessun Dorma."

The album was released on the date of the fourth season premiere of Talent, which was June 23, 2009.

Boyd has since gone on tour with Britain's Got Talent winner Paul Potts, and later sang for US President Barack Obama and Missouri Governor Matt Blunt.

== Reception ==
=== Commercial performance ===
The album sold 6,000 copies in its first week of release. The album also debuted at #195 on the Billboard 200 and #3 on the Top Classical Albums Chart.

=== Critical reception ===
James Manheim of AllMusic said Boyd's talent "leaves an impression on listeners. That's the quality that makes for a crossover star." Stephen Thomas Erlewine called it "an effective showcase for his supple singing if not quite an artistic statement of purpose. Thankfully, Boyd avoids the ersatz Euro-schlock of Il Divo, never trying to have a pop production, instead being happily symphonic."

== Track listing ==
1. "God Bless the U.S.A." 3:57
2. "Nessun dorma" 3:05
3. "Mama" 3:23
4. "Somewhere" 3:22
5. "Il Gladiatore" 3:45
6. "Bring Him Home" 3:43
7. "Is Nothing Sacred" 4:12
8. "Anthem" 3:08
9. "Sonny Boy" 2:58
10. "Ave Maria" 4:47
11. "Amazing Grace" 2:36

== Personnel ==
These are the personnel who helped create the album.

- Savan Kotecha (Composer)
- Winston Simone (Executive Producer)
- Peter Rudge (Representation)
- Neal E. Boyd (Vocals, Liner Notes)
- Evelyn de Morgan (A&R)
- Jeffrey Pescetto (Lyricist)
- Jon Bailey (Engineer, Mixing, Digital Editing)
- Justin S. Turner (Legal Counsel)
- City of Prague Philharmonic Orchestra (Choir, Orchestra)

== Charts ==
=== Chart positions ===
Chart (2009)	Peak position
US Billboard 200	195
US Billboard Top Classical Albums Chart	3
US Billboard Top Heatseekers	10
US Billboard Year End Classical Albums Chart	29

=== Sales ===
Country	Sales
United States	6,000
