= Santa Buddies =

- DVD cover art
- Directed by: Robert Vince
- Written by: Robert Vince; Anna McRoberts
- Based on: Characters by Paul Tamasy; Aaron Mendelsohn; Kevin DiCicco; Robert Vince; Anna McRoberts
- Produced by: Robert Vince; Anna McRoberts
- Starring: Christopher Lloyd; Danny Woodburn; Craig Anton; Michael Teigen; Ben Giroux; Paul Rae; George Wendt; Tom Bosley; Field Cate; Tim Conway; Chris Coppola; Josh Flitter; Skyler Gisondo; Zachary Gordon; Richard Kind; Kaitlyn Maher; Liliana Mumy; Ty Panitz
- Cinematography: Kamal Derkaoui
- Edited by: Kelly Herron
- Music by: Brahm Wenger
- Production companies: Keystone Entertainment; Key Pix Productions
- Distributed by: Walt Disney Studios Home Entertainment (Note: Released through the Walt Disney Pictures banner.)
- Release date: November 24, 2009
- Running time: 88 minutes
- Country: United States
- Language: English

Santa Buddies, also known as Santa Buddies: The Legend of Santa Paws, is a 2009 American Christmas comedy film. It is the fourth installment of the Air Buddies spin-off series as well as the ninth film in the Air Bud franchise. It was released on DVD and Blu-ray by Walt Disney Studios Home Entertainment on November 24, 2009.

== Plot ==
At the North Pole, Santa Claus and his dog Santa Paws, an all-white Great Pyrenees, go outside to examine the magical Christmas Icicle, which is melting because nobody believes in Christmas anymore; if it continues to melt, Christmas will be gone forever.

After causing mayhem in Santa's workshop and getting exiled for it, Puppy Paws, the fun-loving son of Santa Paws, stares at the Icicle and states "I wish Christmas would just disappear", which causes it to crack. He finds Budderball on Santa's naughty list for eating the Thanksgiving turkey and figures he's just the dog to show him how to be an ordinary puppy. Meanwhile, the Christmas Icicle makes a big crack, shuts off the power at the North Pole, and makes the reindeer weak and powerless.

Budderball and the other Buddies also lacking in Christmas spirit, believe that Santa Paws is their father in disguise, and that the naughty list is a way to scare them to behave. Sniffer however replies that Christmas is about giving and a holiday they must learn to respect.

Puppy Paws makes it to Fernfield, Washington to find Budderball in his home. Budderball introduces Puppy Paws to his brothers and sister. The North Pole puppy ends up being a nuisance to each of the Buddies: Budderball is framed for eating the shortbread cookies as he tries to get back on the nice list; B-Dawg gets beaten at breakdancing by Puppy Paws, who even accidentally breaks a vase; Puppy Paws, unaware not to do so, shakes dirt out of his fur in the living room after Mudbud gives him lessons on how to roll in the dirt, creating holiday shapes of the dirt spots which results in Mudbud being put in a cover-up coat for the rest of the day; Rosebud gets an extreme Christmas makeover, and Buddha's meditation statue is turned into a snowman as Puppy Paws explains that the snowman is "what citizens of the North Pole meditate in front of".

Fed up with Puppy Paws' antics, the Buddies lose their patience and eject him from their house. They soon learn that Puppy Paws isn't hurting them as they are hurting themselves and decide to treat him with compassion. Puppy Paws gets taken away by dog catcher Stan Cruge, who takes him to the pound. There, Puppy Paws meets a puppy named Tiny who is wishing for a Christmas miracle and sings a song about miracles, which teaches Puppy Paws about the true meaning of Christmas.

The Buddies, along with an elf dog named Eddy, come to the rescue. Eddy tells Cruge that he knows the dog catcher always wanted a puppy for Christmas, but his mother was allergic to dogs and never got one, which made Cruge hate Christmas and become a dog catcher.

With help from an elf named Eli, Christmas spirit returns, the Christmas Icicle stops melting, and the North Pole is back in business. Puppy Paws and the Buddies make it to the North Pole. The reindeer are unable to fly, and Puppy Paws and the Buddies volunteer to save Christmas with their uncanny abilities. A changed Mr. Cruge brings Tiny over to the child who has been asking for a puppy as a Christmas present. Tiny says her goodbyes to the Buddies and Puppy Paws. After their last delivery, Santa Claus and Santa Paws arrive in Fernfield. Santa puts the Buddies (including Budderball) on top of the nice list, Puppy Paws becomes part of Santa's family, and the Buddies bid him farewell.

Mr. Cruge is invited to dinner with Tiny's new family. The film ends with the entire town, led by Cruge, singing "Silent Night" in front of Fernfield's Christmas tree.

== Cast ==
=== Live action ===
- Christopher Lloyd as Stan Cruge
- Danny Woodburn as Eli
- George Wendt as Santa Claus. Wendt reprises his role from Santa Baby.
- Craig Anton as Bob
- Michael Teigen as Sheriff Dan
- Ben Giroux as Clark
- Paul Rae as Hank
- Nico Ghisi as Bartleby Livingstone, Budderball's owner
- Gig Morton as Billy, B-Dawg's owner
- Ryan Grantham as Sam, Buddha's owner
- Quinn Lord as Pete Howard, Mudbud's owner
- Sophia Ludwig as Alice Finch, Rosebud's owner
- Andrew Astor as Mikey, Bob's son and Tiny's new owner

=== Voice ===
- Tom Bosley as Santa Paws, a Great Pyrenees
- Field Cate as Buddha
- Tim Conway as Sniffer
- Chris Coppola as Comet, a Reindeer
- Josh Flitter as Budderball
- Skyler Gisondo as B-Dawg
- Zachary Gordon as Puppy Paws, Santa Paws' son
- Richard Kind as Eddy, a Jack Russell Terrier
- Kaitlyn Maher as Tiny, a Yorkshire Terrier
- Liliana Mumy as Rosebud
- Ty Panitz as Mudbud (Jonathan Morgan Heit when singing)

== Sequels ==
A prequel called The Search for Santa Paws was released on November 23, 2010.

Spooky Buddies was released on September 20, 2011, as a Halloween film, featuring the Buddies in a new adventure filled with curses, ghosts, and mayhem, and an attempt to stop Warwick the Warlock and the Halloween Hound. Treasure Buddies was released on January 31, 2012, as an Indiana Jones-like film, featuring the Buddies in another new adventure trying to stop Cleocatra in Egypt.

== See also ==
- List of Christmas films
- Santa Claus in film
