= ZOOperstars! =

American entertainment act

- Founded: Louisville, Kentucky (December 1998)
- Founder: Dominic and Brennan Latkovski
- Services: Sports Entertainment
- Number of employees: 17
- Website: zooperstars.com

ZOOperstars! is a traveling inflatable entertainment act, based in Louisville, Kentucky, who utilizes comedy, acrobatics, tricks and maneuvers accompanied by synchronized dancing to entertain. The name ZOOperstars! is derived from the "pun-based animal athlete monikers such as Shark McGwire, Ken Giraffey Jr. and Tim Tebull." Currently, the mascot dance troupe has over 40 different characters who sport similar pun-based names. The ZOOperstars! act is one of the busiest traveling entertainment acts in the business. In the sports industry, they are most famous for their popular "Eat It" skit where "the impressively tall inflatable clam clad in a Sammy Sosa jersey greedily "devours" opposing coaches, bat boys, or whoever else happens to be around, then spits out his meal's shirt, shoes, and cap, all while Weird Al Yankovic's Eat It plays in the background." Their most notable accomplishment could be a earning a place in the Top 20 in 2008 on NBC's America's Got Talent.

== History ==
The ZOOperstars! were created by brothers, Dominic and Brennan Latkovski in 1998. Dominic got his start in 1990 as Triple-A Louisville Redbirds mascot, Billy Bird. Over the course of the first two seasons, Dominic would have younger brother, Brennan, play the antagonist roles such as an umpire, for on-field skits. In 1992, the two brothers obtained a booth at the MLB Trade Show and marketed the Billy Bird act. After success in their first year, Dominic says, "[The Redbirds] wanted me to sign a contract giving them a big portion of the money in exchange for using the name and the costume, and that's when we decided to break free and create a new character." In came BirdZerk!, a neon green, yellow and purple bird based on the costume the brothers were accustomed to performing in as their former act. The brothers then saw two inflatable characters, University of Nebraska's Lil' Red and an All Sport bottle and decided to add inflatable characters to the act. After seeing the appeal of inflatable characters at their BirdZerk show, Andy Latkovski, the brothers' father, suggested they add another character to the act. The character was Harry Canary. However, in 1998, after a few faltered attempts to add Harry Canary to the cast of BirdZerk!, the brothers had the revelation to create a whole new act full of inflatable mascots with similar pun-based animal athlete names. In the winter of 1998, the Latkovski brothers took their new ZOOperstars! act to the MLB Trade Show. The act was a big hit with names like Harry Canary, Ken Giraffey Jr., Shark McGwire, and Cow Ripken Jr. In the years since, the ZOOperstars! have performed at over 200 different sports teams around the world, and multiple appearances on America's Got Talent.
