= Neal E. Boyd =

American opera singer (1975–2018)

- Boyd signing an autograph

Background information
- Born: Neal Evans Boyd; November 18, 1975; Sikeston, Missouri, U.S.
- Died: June 10, 2018 (aged 42) Sikeston, Missouri, U.S.
- Genres: Operatic pop; classical crossover
- Occupations: Singer
- Instruments: Vocals
- Years active: 2008–2018
- Label: Decca (2009–2018)

Neal Evans Boyd (November 18, 1975 – June 10, 2018) was an American singer who developed an interest in opera after listening to the performances of the Three Tenors. Despite being raised in conditions of poverty within the U.S. state of Missouri, he achieved a degree in music and eventually entered the third season of America's Got Talent, winning that year's competition. In addition to music, he also became involved in politics and conducted performances at many state-wide events across Missouri.

Boyd died in June 2018, following complications brought on in his battle against liver disease. His funeral included tributes to his performance, including clips from his participation on America's Got Talent.

== Early life and education ==
Boyd was born in Sikeston, Missouri, in 1975 and grew up there. His father is black, and his mother is white. Boyd and his brother were raised solely by their mother and subsequently endured poverty conditions. Boyd discovered operatic music in junior high school when his older brother was doing a school project involving classical music and brought home a CD of the Three Tenors. Boyd was so taken by the trio that he started learning to sing in Luciano Pavarotti's and Plácido Domingo's operatic styles. Boyd graduated from Sikeston High School in May 1994, where he was senior class president.

Boyd earned a bachelor's degree in speech communications from Southeast Missouri State University in Cape Girardeau, Missouri (May 2001), a bachelor's degree in music from the University of Missouri School of Music in Columbia, Missouri (May 2001), continued his studies at the New England Conservatory of Music and later earned a master's degree in management from the online University of Phoenix. Boyd was president of the Student Senate at Southeast Missouri State University, where he was also a member of Lambda Chi Alpha fraternity. While in college, Boyd interned at the state capitol in Jefferson City, Missouri.

After teaching music for the 2001–2002 school year in his hometown of Sikeston, Boyd attended the New England Conservatory of Music in Boston to study opera. This led to a role as the slave "York" in Michael Ching's World Premier Opera "Corps of Discovery, A Musical Journey," commissioned by University of Missouri.

== Music career ==
=== America's Got Talent ===
While working as an insurance salesman in the spring of 2008, Boyd drove to Chicago without telling his mother or best friend, and stood in line with 20,000 people auditioning for America's Got Talent. For his initial audition, Boyd performed Billy Joel’s "New York State of Mind", then followed it up with Celine Dion and Andrea Bocelli’s "The Prayer".

Boyd began appearing in national commercials weeks before the season started in June. During his time in Los Angeles, Boyd lived in the Sheraton Universal Hotel. He went to work each day at CBS Studio Center, located in the Studio City district of Los Angeles in the San Fernando Valley.

Boyd later sang "Nessun dorma" in front of an AGT audience, which the crowd stood and cheered midway through. The judges advanced him to Las Vegas. On October 1, 2008, five contestants remained: Boyd, piano player Eli Mattson, violin duo Nuttin' But Stringz, classical music vocalist Donald Braswell and soul singer Queen Emily. The audience was filled with Boyd's friends and family (some of whom were watching at home), the other finalists (Top 5 and Top 10), and 12.5 million people were watching the live broadcast.

Boyd performed "Nessun dorma" again to end the season, after being announced the winner. His hero Plácido Domingo congratulated Boyd via video, saying: "By taking part in America's Got Talent, you have brought to America's ears opera."

==== Performances and results ====
Week	Theme	Song choice	Original artist/composer	Performance order	Result
Audition	Inspiration	"Nessun dorma"	Puccini	Final (Episode 1)	Advanced
Vegas Verdicts	Classical Singers	"Unchained Melody"	Todd Duncan		Advanced
Top 40	Group 1	"Somewhere"	Leonard Bernstein	10	Advanced
Top 20	Group 1 Heroes	"Mama"	Il Divo	7	Advanced
Top 10	Inspirations	"All by Myself"	Eric Carmen	8	Advanced
Top 5	Finals	"Nessun dorma"	Puccini	3	Winner

=== Post-AGT ===
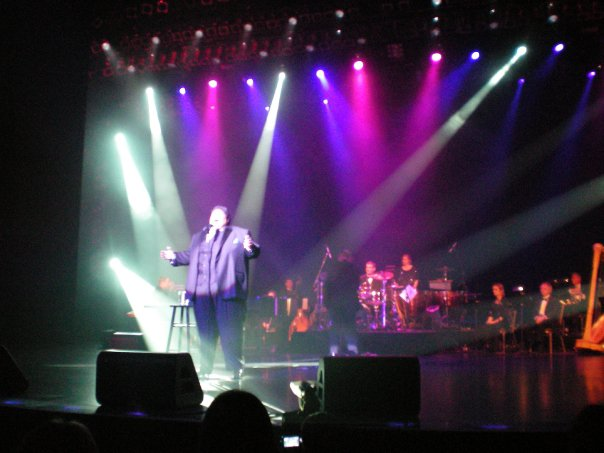
Neal E. Boyd Performing

Boyd was awarded the $1-million prize and a headline show at the MGM Grand Las Vegas hosted by Jerry Springer.

In October 2008, his hometown declared the month of October "Neal E. Boyd Month". Two months later, he was a special guest performer on NBC's holiday special “Christmas in Rockefeller Center." and later signed to Decca Records and released his debut album, My American Dream, on June 23, 2009 (the day of AGT's season 4 premiere). It debuted at No. 195 on the Billboard 200 and No. 3 on the Top Classical Albums Chart. In July 2009, Boyd then went on a ten-city tour from Dallas to D.C. with Britain’s Got Talent winner Paul Potts and was a guest performer on several television shows, including Today and Live with Regis and Kelly.

In 2010, he headlined a second Las Vegas show at the Las Vegas Hilton, which also included other performers from the AGT's third season, like Eli Mattson, Kaitlyn Maher, Queen Emily and Nuttin' But Stringz. His dressing room was the dressing room of Elvis Presley. On March 10 of that year, Boyd performed for U.S. President Barack Obama while he visited Missouri. He also performed for Presidents George W. Bush, Bill Clinton and George H. W. Bush.

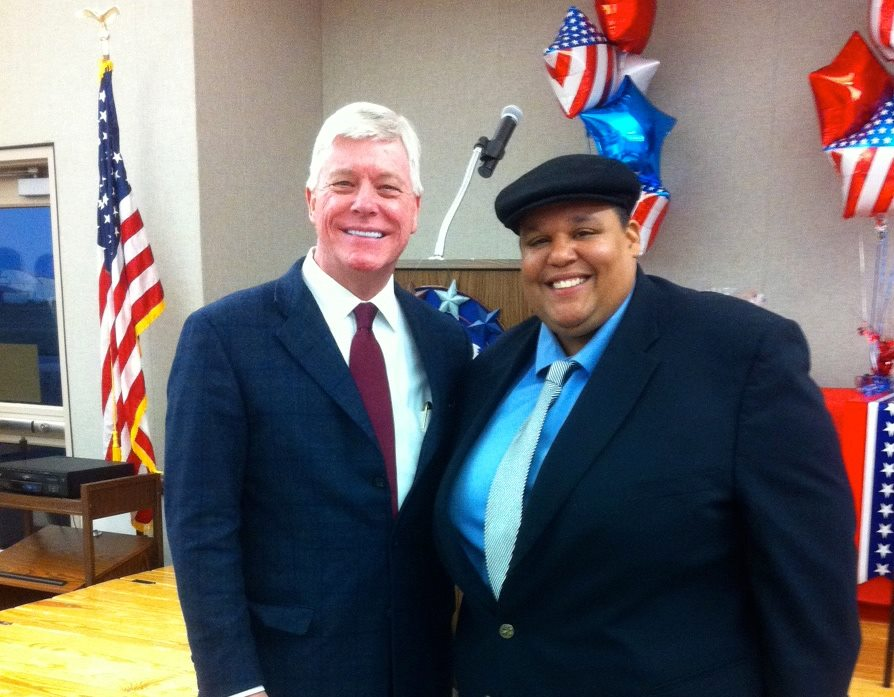
Neal E. Boyd and former Missouri Lt. Governor Peter Kinder

Boyd was the co-owner of Cox & Boyd Insurance Solutions, an insurance agency with locations in St. Louis and Sikeston, Missouri, and the vice president of sales for Voluntary Benefit Services, also located in St. Louis.

== Politics ==
In addition to music, Boyd was motivated throughout his life by public service and community involvement. After performing for Presidents George H. W. Bush, Bill Clinton, George W. Bush and Barack Obama, Boyd also sang for seven governors.

Beginning in 1996, he was among the young people who worked for eight-term congressman Bill Emerson and then for congresswoman JoAnn Emerson. He sang at Emerson's funeral that year.

In 1998, Boyd was selected for the Missouri Legislative Internship Program and moved to Jefferson City where he worked for State Representative Paula Carter. He was elected Speaker of the House in the interns’ legislative session.

In 2000, he sang at the memorial service for former Missouri Governor Mel Carnahan, who died in a plane crash during his U.S. Senate run against then senator and later U.S. Attorney General John Ashcroft, whom he later worked for when he was a senator at the time.

In 2003, he was a guest of the Emerson family and part of the delegation and ceremonial opening of the new $100 million Bill Emerson Memorial Bridge. He sang the national anthem at the ceremony, and afterwards was one of the first Missourians to cross the new bridge in the parade that followed.

In 2005, he sang the National Anthem at the inauguration of Missouri Governor Matt Blunt, who appointed Boyd to two of Missouri's commissions: the Workforce Development Board and the Training and Employment Council.

He ran for a seat in the Missouri House of Representatives in 2012, but lost to Democrat Steve Hodges by 66 to 34%. On August 28, 2012, Boyd performed Lee Greenwood's "God Bless the U.S.A." at the Republican National Convention in Tampa, Florida.

On September 5, 2013, Boyd announced that he would again seek to be elected to the Missouri House of Representatives from the 149th district in 2014. He was defeated in the August 2014 Republican primary by Don Rone, who won the seat in the November general election.

Various Missouri state and local officials nicknamed Boyd "The Voice of Missouri" due to his appearances at many prominent statewide events.

== Philanthropy ==
Boyd donated to many charitable causes, and created a permanent legacy at his alma mater, Southeast Missouri State University. In 2015, to celebrate his education and experience and to support future students, he created the Neal E. Boyd Endowed Scholarship in Performing Arts. The scholarship is awarded annually to a student majoring in performing arts who meets a GPA requirement and demonstrates financial need. Preference is given to students involved in leadership activities such as Greek Life and the Student Government Association. As an alumnus Boyd was a recipient of the university's "Distinguished Service Award."

== Death and tributes ==
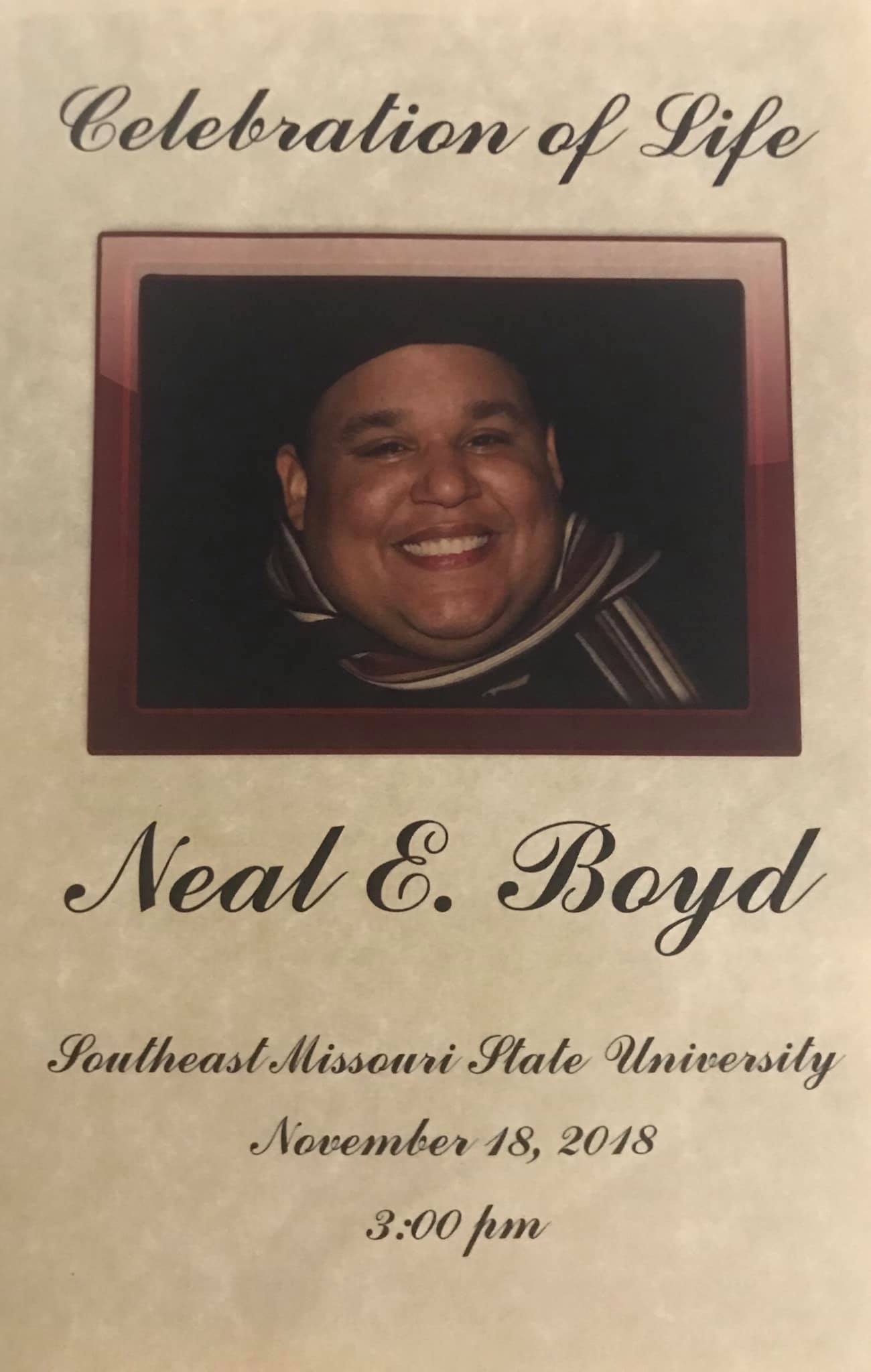
2018 Neal E. Boyd memorial program

On the night of June 10, 2018, Neal E. Boyd died at the age of 42 at his mother's home in Sikeston, due to a combination of heart failure and kidney failure, compounded by liver disease according to a spokesperson from the Scott County coroner's office.

The following day, NBC said in a statement via America's Got Talent: "We are very saddened to hear that one of our 'AGT family members', Neal E. Boyd, has passed away. Our hearts are with Neal’s loved ones during this difficult time." Former AGT Judge Piers Morgan expressed his sadness at the news, sharing a photo of him on Twitter with Boyd following his win on the third season and writing: "Very sad to hear...(He was a) Lovely guy with a wonderful voice."

A private funeral was held on June 15, 2018. On June 17, ten years after Boyd auditioned for AGT, the Southeast Missourian newspaper published an editorial titled "Neal Boyd blessed us all with his God-given talent." It concluded with: "Boyd lived a short life, but he left behind a legacy of making the most of his God-given talent through hard work, dedication and passion. He used his gifts to inspire and lift others and will be greatly missed."

A complete obituary ran in the Southeast Missourian on November 10, 2018 and an obituary ran in the St. Louis Post-Dispatch the following day just ahead of the public memorial service. On November 18, on what would have been Boyd's 43rd birthday, friends and family gathered for a public memorial inside Academic Hall on the campus of Southeast Missouri State University. The celebration included testimony from the former Missouri lieutenant governor Peter Kinder, a video clip of Boyd from America's Got Talent, music from his albums, a live performance, personal stories, and an audio recording he made about what he would want to say to family and friends if he had to say goodbye.

In February 2019, Britain's Got Talent winner Paul Potts reminded viewers about the legacy of Boyd, after his performance of "Nessun dorma" on America's Got Talent: The Champions. Host Terry Crews said: "Now, Paul, I understand you have someone really special you'd love to dedicate your performance to tonight." Potts replied: "There is an America’s Got Talent winner that isn’t here tonight: Neal E. Boyd. Like me, he came on as an underdog, he gave his all (gave us all his story) and he won (with his heart), and one thing you could never take away is the fact that he is a champion. He is a winner."

== Discography ==
=== Albums ===
Year	Album	Peak chart positions				Certifications (sales threshold)
Year	Album	US	US Class	US Heat	Year End Class	Certifications (sales threshold)
2009	My American Dream: Label: Decca; Released: June 23, 2009; Format: CD, digital download	195	3	10	29	US sales: 6,000

=== Singles ===
Year	Single	Peak	Album
Year	Single	US	Album
2009	"God Bless the U.S.A."	–	My American Dream

== See also ==
- Paul Potts

Preceded by Terry Fator	America's Got Talent winner Season 3 (Summer 2008)	Succeeded by Kevin Skinner
