= Chris Coppola =

American actor (born 1968)

- Born: Christopher Coppola; November 26, 1968 (age 57); Los Angeles, California, U.S.
- Occupations: Actor; comedian
- Years active: 1997–present

Christopher Coppola (born November 26, 1968) is an American actor and comedian. Known for his work as a character actor, he made his film debut with a minor role in Spawn (1997).

After a series of guest appearances on television shows and numerous minor roles in films, including a supporting role in the animated Christmas film The Polar Express (2004), Coppola had his first starring role in the action comedy film Postal (2007). That same year, he starred in the horror film BloodRayne 2: Deliverance and had a supporting role in the animated fantasy film Beowulf. He went on to have supporting roles in the films Visioneers (2008) and Far Cry (2008).

In the 2010s, Coppola had a supporting role in the comedy film Diary of a Wimpy Kid: The Long Haul (2017), as well as a recurring role as Melvin Redmond in the Amazon Prime Video miniseries Too Old to Die Young (2019). He currently has a main voice role as Enzo Ferino on the Netflix adult animated series Devil May Cry (2025–present).

== Career ==
Chris is best known for his roles in such movies as Friday the 13th, Far Cry, Postal, Loveless in Los Angeles, The Polar Express, Beowulf, and Diary of a Wimpy Kid: The Long Haul. He also voiced Dancer in Santa Buddies, and appeared in the episode "Tailgate" on the sitcom How I Met Your Mother.

== Filmography ==
=== Film ===
Year	Title	Role	Notes
1997	Spawn	Punk #2	
1998	Ringmaster	Goat Boy	Uncredited
2002	L.A.X.	Sheldon	
2002	Spider-Man	Kyle	Uncredited
2002	Simone	Echo Photographer	
2002	The Tuxedo	Bodyguard	Uncredited
2004	Dog Gone Love	Chuck	
2004	The Polar Express	Toothless Boy / Elf	Voice
2005	Forbidden Warrior	Jibberish	
2006	Cloud 9	Stalker	
2006	Alexander the Great	Darius	
2006	Monster Night	Mr. Incredulous	
2007	Undead or Alive	Cletus	
2007	Loveless in Los Angeles	Freddie	
2007	Postal	Richard	
2007	Saint Anthony	Elias	
2007	BloodRayne 2: Deliverance	Newton Piles	
2007	Beowulf	Olaf	
2008	Visioneers	Todd	
2008	Far Cry	Emillio	
2009	Friday the 13th	Gas Station Attendant	
2009	Shadow	Buck	
2009	Santa Buddies	Comet	Voice
2010	I Kissed a Vampire	Dr. Dan Helsing	
2010	Sinatra Club	Roundy	
2010	The Search for Santa Paws	Gus	
2012	Santa Paws 2: The Santa Pups	Dancer	Voice
2013	Super Buddies	Mr. Bull	
2015	Russell Madness	Dozer	Voice
2015	Monkey Up	Stan	
2016	The Last Bid	Barry	
2016	Pup Star	Tune	Voice
2017	Diary of a Wimpy Kid: The Long Haul	Mr. Beardo	
2017	Garlic & Gunpowder	The Clown	
2017	Pup Star: Better 2Gether	Rocky	
2017	Shot	Cat Scan Tech	
2018	Stuck	Jimmy Palicelli	
2018	Mission Possible	Frank	
2018	Acts of Desperation	Stu	
2020	Disrupted	Ed	
2021	Take Me to Tarzana	Morgan Schmeltz	
2021	The Dog of Christmas	Jerry	

=== Television ===
Year	Title	Role	Notes
1998	ER	Cop	Episode: "Carter's Choice"
1999	The Pretender	Zipper	Episode: "The Assassin"
2003	Ghost Dog: A Detective Tail	Wally	Television film
2004	Judging Amy	Flower Delivery Guy	Episode: "Sins of the Father"
2004	CSI: Crime Scene Investigation	Clyde Grimes	Episode: "Dead Ringer"
2005	The West Wing	Howard	Episode: "King Corn"
2005	Love, Inc.	Chuck	Episode: "One on One"
2005	I Love the '80s 3-D	—N/a	2 episodes
2007	Cory in the House	Carl	Episode: "Rock the Vote"
2010	Cold Case	Cole Austen	Episode: "Almost Paradise"
2011	Wizards of Waverly Place	Customer	Episode: "Everything's Rosie for Justin"
2011	Kickin' It	Officer Bloat	Episode: "Wasabi Warrior"
2012	How I Met Your Mother	Guy in Black Suit	Episode: "Tailgate"
2013	Wedding Band	Over-Toaster	Episode: "99 Problems"
2013	The Goodwin Games	Construction Worker	Episode: "Welcome Home, Goodwins"
2013	Rizzoli & Isles	Mark Lewis	Episode: "Judge, Jury and Executioner"
2014	Bones	Kyle Stanley	Episode: "The Source in the Sludge"
2014	The Middle	Gene	Episode: "The Smell"
2014	Super Larry	Sheriff	Episode: "Pilot"
2014–2016	Doc McStuffins	Tony the Taxi (voice)	4 episodes
2015	Two and a Half Men	Douglas	Episode: "Of Course He's Dead"
2016	Agent Carter	Hank	2 episodes
2016	Ray Donovan	Larry	4 episodes
2016	Good Girls Revolt	Rich Riccardi	2 episodes
2016	Hitting the Breaks	Donny Dochard	Episode: "Safe House"
2019	Too Old to Die Young	Melvin Redmond	4 episodes
2020	Russell Maniac	Dozer (voice)	3 episodes
2020	Sneakerheads	Frank	Episode: "CSI: Sandwich"
2022	The Afterparty	Mickey	Episode: "Brett"
2022	Barry	Mel	Episode: "candy asses"
2023	Killing It	Andre	Episode: "Mallory"
2023	Spidey and His Amazing Friends	Neighbor Dad (voice)	Episode: "Spin Saves the Day/Water Woes"
2024	Ted	Video Store Clerk	Episode: "Ejectile Dysfunction"
2024	Invincible Fight Girl	Announcer (voice)	3 episodes
2025–present	Devil May Cry	Enzo Ferino (voice)	7 episodes
