= Santa Paws 2: The Santa Pups =

- Video release cover
- Directed by: Robert Vince
- Written by: Robert Vince; Anna McRoberts; Philip Fracassi
- Based on: Characters by Paul Tamasy; Aaron Mendelsohn; Kevin DiCicco; Robert Vince; Anna McRoberts
- Produced by: Anna McRoberts; Robert Vince
- Starring: Cheryl Ladd; George Newbern; Pat Finn; Danny Woodburn; Obba Babatunde; Paul Rae; Josh Feldman; Brian T. Finney; Jennifer Elise Cox; Audrey Wasilewski; Ali Hillis; Ted Rooney; Bill Chott; Jay Brazeau; Kaitlyn Maher; Richard Kind; Diedrich Bader; Chris Coppola; Tom Everett Scott; Bonnie Somerville; Josh Flitter; Trevor Wright
- Cinematography: Mark Irwin
- Edited by: Kelly Herron
- Music by: Brahm Wenger
- Production company: KeyPix Productions
- Distributed by: Walt Disney Studios Home Entertainment
- Release date: November 20, 2012
- Running time: 88 minutes
- Countries: United States; Canada
- Language: English

Santa Paws 2: The Santa Pups is a 2012 Christmas adventure film directed by Robert Vince and produced by Anna McRoberts. It is the sequel to The Search for Santa Paws (2010). The film was released by Walt Disney Studios Home Entertainment on DVD, Blu-ray, and as a film download on November 20, 2012.

== Plot ==
Mrs. Paws has just given birth to four puppies named Hope, Jingle, Charity and Noble. Four months later, the Santa Pups each have their own personalities. Hope is always ready to take action wherever she goes, but never takes caution. Jingle loves to sing, but she can only sing off-key. Charity still needs to learn how to share, and Noble pretends to be the leader of his sisters, and leads them into trouble.

In school, Noble asks Eli and Eddy if they can have their own magic crystals, but they have to understand the True Meaning of Christmas to earn one. The Santa Pups are then taken on a field trip to the cave of the Great Christmas Icicle, where they learn how magic is used, and how the Christmas Magic in the icicle is used to power the magic crystals. They see on the spirit map that Christmas spirit is highest in Pineville, USA where they learn an ambassador named Michelle Reynolds has recently died.

In Pineville, every citizen is ecstatic about Christmas, including Michelle's widowed husband Thomas and their 8-year-old daughter Sarah, except for their 12-year-old son Carter who has lost his Christmas spirit after his mother's death and has become apathetic and cold-hearted.

When Mrs. Claus prepares to go to Pineville to find a new Santa Claus ambassador, Noble comes up with a plan of his own. His plan is to take Eddy's magic crystal collar, and then fly to Pineville to prove that they are ready for their own crystals. Once in Pineville, Noble begins granting the first Christmas wish to a girl named Taylor who wishes to skate really well, and then to another girl named Sally who wishes for her two front teeth. After a furious Carter wishes for the Christmas spirit to disappear, Noble ends up granting a terrible Christmas wish that then affects all of the people in town. Everyone who Carter meets loses their kindness and Christmas spirit. The Santa Pups then meet a new friend Baxter, who his owner Jeb Gibson, owns a dog shelter, and after being affected by Carter's wish, loses his kindness to animals and catches the Santa Pups and locks them in a cage.

The Santa Pups then explain that if they don't get the crystal back and reverse the wish, Christmas could be in big trouble. The Santa Pups then try to retrieve the crystal with help from Hope, but Hope is not careful on the descent, and accidentally wakes up Brutus. Brutus explains that his life has been pretty rough due to his owner Owen losing his Christmas Spirit. The Santa Pups agree to get Santa to take him off the Naughty List.

Mrs. Claus, Carter, Sarah, the pups, and three sisters named Dorothy, Blue and Agnes, that Mrs. Claus met, try to bring the Christmas spirit back forever. They do this by airing on the radio and convincing everyone to act like normal. Carter wishes for the Christmas spirit to last forever all over the world. The pups are then able to reverse the wish. Noble gives Eddy his magic crystal collar, and then the Santa Pups, Eli, Eddy, and Mrs. Claus head back to the North Pole. The film ends with the Santa Pups, Eddy and Eli singing about the true meaning of Christmas.

== Cast ==
- Cheryl Ladd as Mrs. Claus
- George Newbern as Thomas Reynolds, Carter and Sarah's caring widowed father who is a lawyer.
- Pat Finn as Santa Claus
- Danny Woodburn as Eli, Santa's head elf.
- Obba Babatunde as Mayor Denny, the mayor of Pineville.
- Kaitlyn Maher as Sarah Reynolds, a sweet, loving 8-year-old girl who has the most Christmas spirit.
- Paul Rae as Jeb Gibson, Thomas' step-brother and Sarah and Carter's paternal uncle who owns the local dog shelter.
- Josh Feldman as Carter Reynolds, a 12-year-old boy who is Sarah's big brother, who has lost his Christmas spirit ever since his mother Michelle died of cancer.
- Brian T. Finney as Sheriff Andy
- Jennifer Elise Cox as Blue Bright, Dorothy & Agnes's middled sister.
- Audrey Wasilewski as Dorothy Bright, Blue & Agnes's oldest sister.
- Ali Hillis as Agnes Bright, Dorothy & Blue's youngest sister.
- Ted Rooney as Mr. Miller
- Bill Chott as Mr. Holman, a Christmas cookie baker.
- Jay Brazeau as Judge
- Jed Rees as Roland
- Tatiana Gudegast as Sally

=== Voice cast ===
- Richard Kind as Eddy, a happy-go-lucky elf dog Jack Russell Terrier who is Eli's assistant.
- Diedrich Bader as Comet, one of Santa's reindeer.
- Chris Coppola as Dancer, another one of Santa's reindeer. Coppola played Gus in the previous film.
- Tom Everett Scott as Santa Paws, husband to Mrs. Paws and father to the Santa Pups.
- Bonnie Somerville as Mrs. Paws, wife to Santa Paws and mother to the Santa Pups. She only appears in the first scene of the film.
- Josh Flitter as Brutus, a gruff bulldog who befriends the Santa Pups in hope of getting off of Santa's naughty list. Flitter voiced T-Money in the previous film.
- Trevor Wright as Baxter, the Santa Pups' newest friend. He is a Schnauzer mix.
- Aidan Gemme as Noble, the only boy and eldest Santa Pup and the irresponsible leader of the Santa Pups.
- Tatiana Gudegast as Hope, the tiniest and the second eldest of the Santa Pups who is always ready to take action, but never thinks beforehand.
- G. Hannelius as Charity, the youngest Santa Pup who enjoys getting stuff for herself and still needs to live up to her name. Hannelius previously played Janie, one of the orphans in the previous film.
- Marlowe Peyton as Jingle, the second youngest Santa Pup who loves to sing but can only sing off-key.

== Release ==
=== Home media ===
Santa Paws 2: The Santa Pups was released on DVD, Blu-ray, and as a film download on November 20, 2012. The physical release was produced in 2 different packages: a 2-disc Blu-ray / DVD combo pack and a 1-disc DVD. The film download was produced in both standard and high definition. Bonus features for the release included a music video for "Santa Pups Music Mash-Up" and "Blooper Scooper".

== See also ==
- Santa Paws
- Santa Claus in film
- List of Christmas films
