= America's Got Talent season 3 =

America's Got Talent
- Season 3
- Showrunner: Jason Raff
- Hosted by: Jerry Springer
- Judges: Piers Morgan; Sharon Osbourne; David Hasselhoff
- Winner: Neal E. Boyd
- Runner-up: Eli Mattson
- Finals venue: Radford Studio Center
- No. of episodes: 20

Release
- Original network: NBC
- Original release: June 17 – October 1, 2008

Season chronology
- ← Previous; Season 2 Next → Season 4

Judges and Host for America's Got Talent Season 3

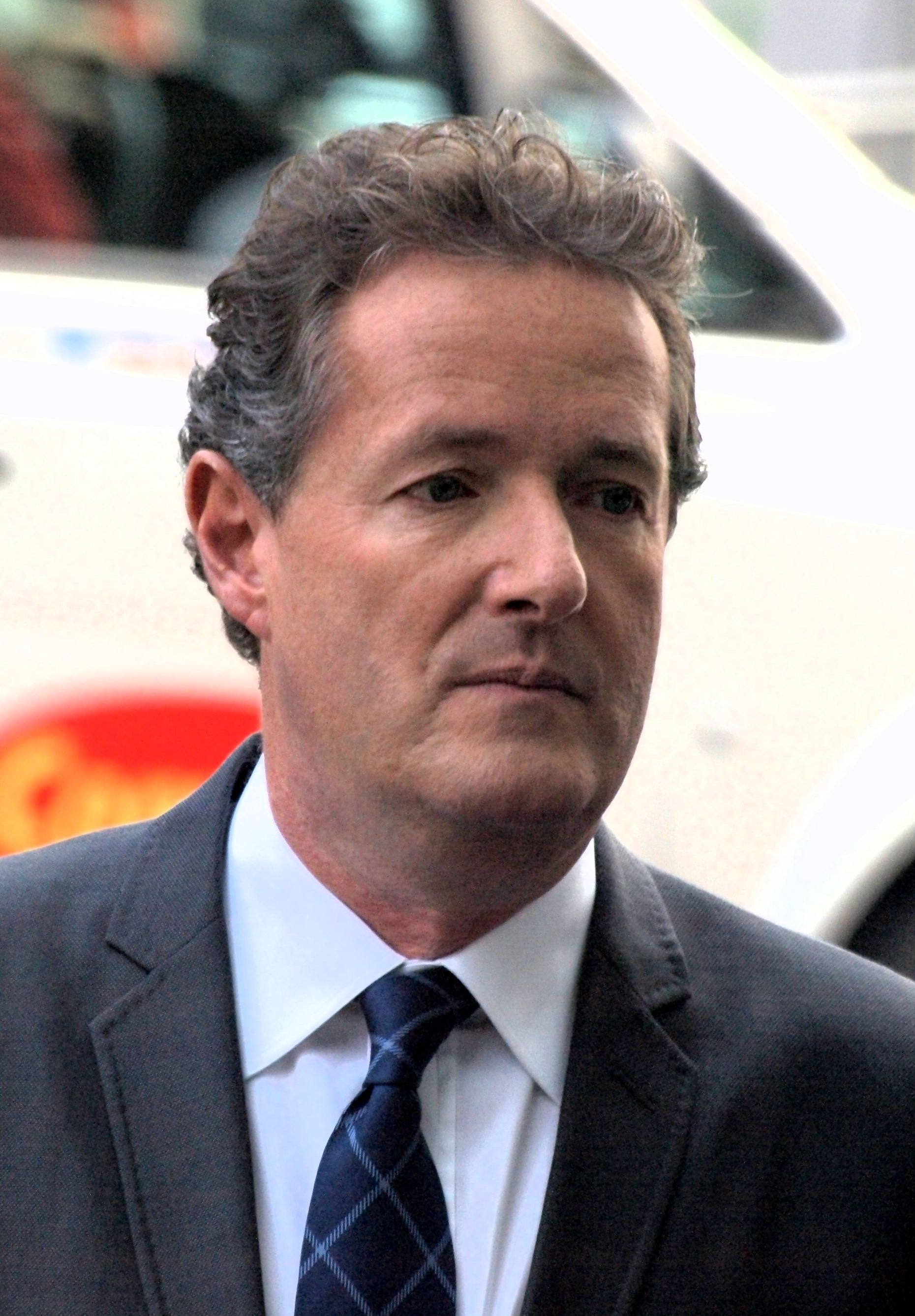
Piers Morgan

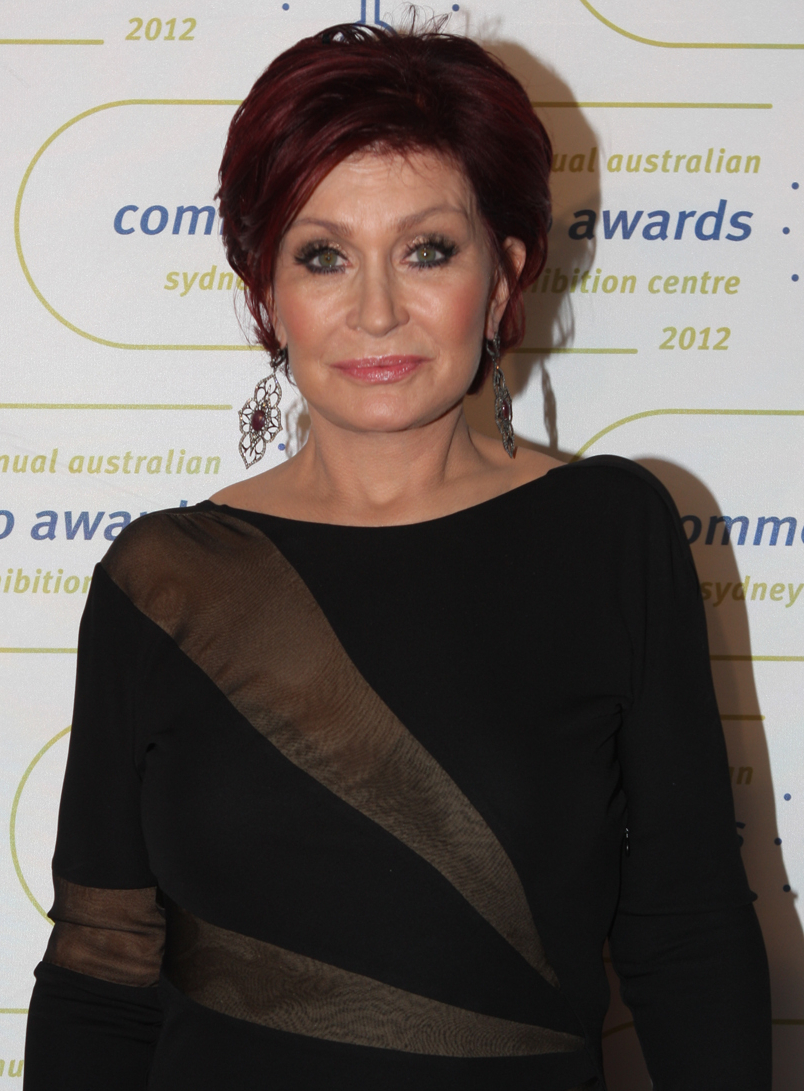
Sharon Osbourne

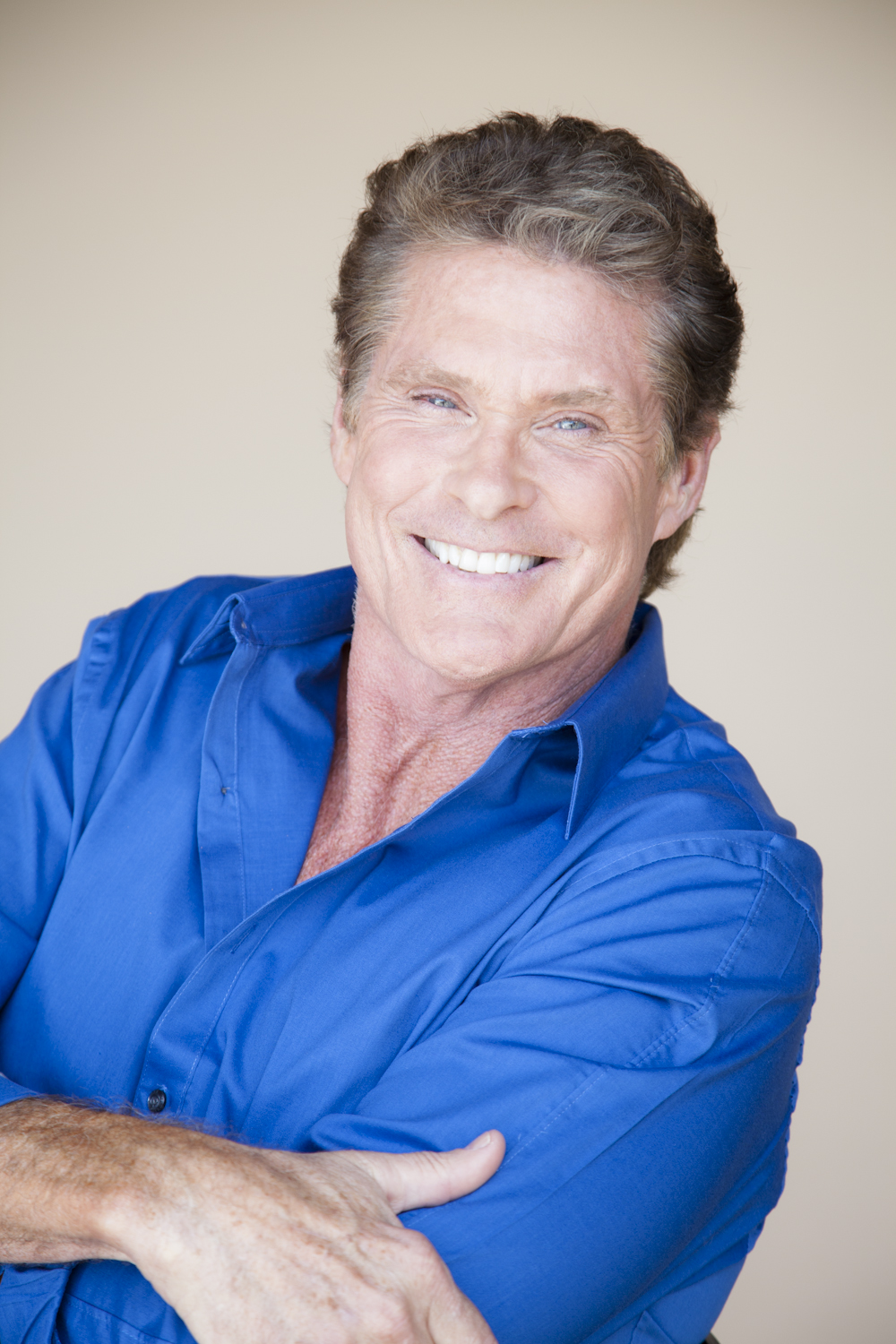
David Hasselhoff

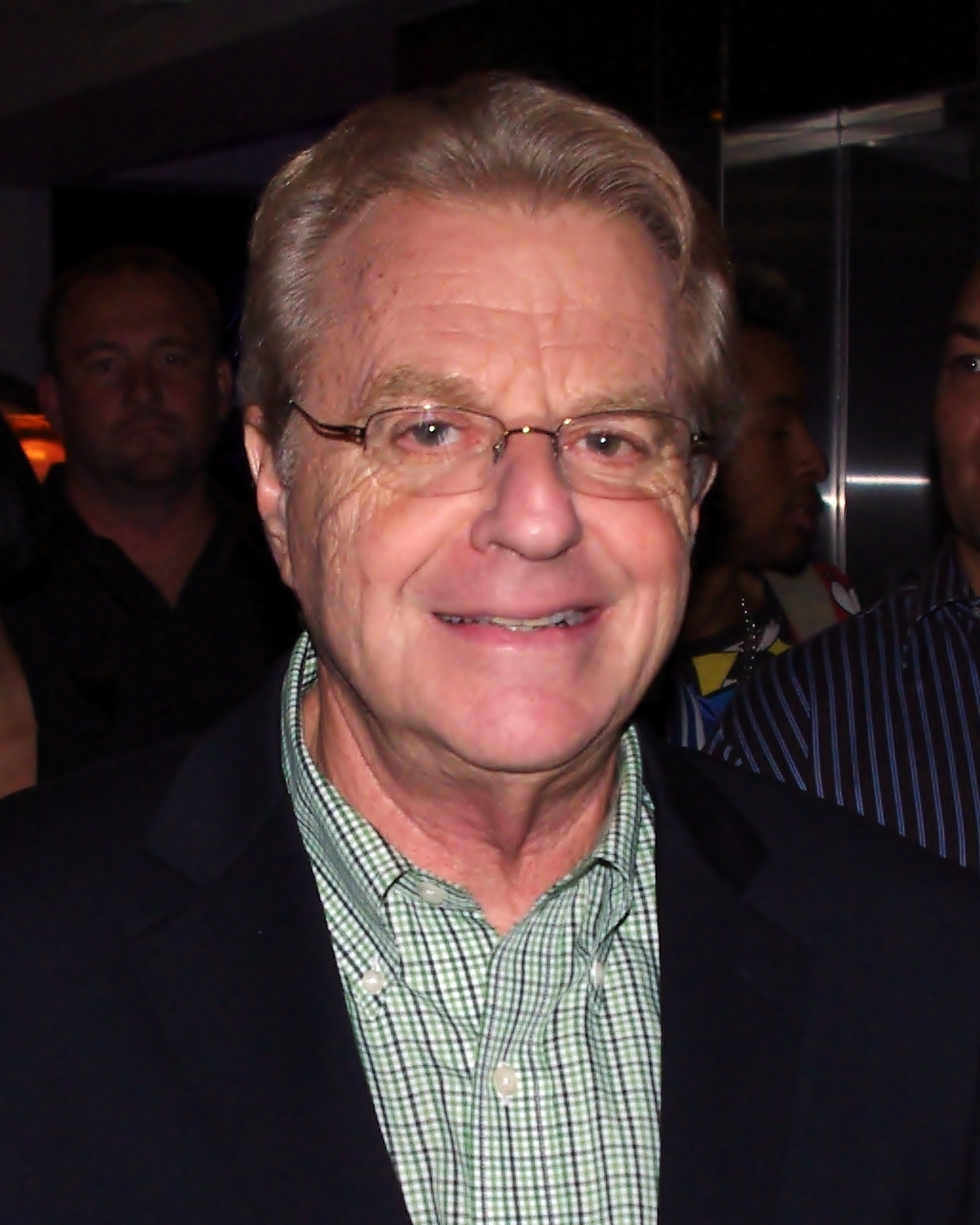
Jerry Springer

The third season of American talent show competition series America's Got Talent was broadcast on NBC from June 17 to October 1, 2008. After the conclusion of the second season, changes to the program included the creation of additional audition episodes in the broadcast schedule, the involvement of quarter-finals in the competition, and doubling the number of participants that advanced from the boot camp stage. Between August 7–26, the show had a planned break to avoid clashing with the network's live coverage of the 2008 Summer Olympics.

The third season was won by opera singer Neal E. Boyd, with singer and pianist Eli Mattson finishing in second place, and violinists Nuttin' But Stringz placing third. During its broadcast, the season averaged roughly over 10.75 million viewers.

== Season overview ==
Following the previous season, auditions took place in five major cities: New York, Chicago, Los Angeles, Dallas, and Atlanta. Additional rounds of auditions were made online via Myspace and Facebook. Changes to the schedule of live episodes were due to the 2008 Summer Olympics, since the event received live coverage on NBC. The program was on hiatus between August 7–26, in order to avoid it clashing with the network's schedule of the sporting event.

The third season had a number of additional changes put into place with the program's format, following the second season, two of which brought it along a similar arrangement used for Britain's Got Talent. Editing of filmed auditions for their respective episodes were conducted in a similar manner to the British edition, with footage in each episode consisting of a montage chosen from each major city whose venue featured audition sessions. For example, a collection of auditions (both minor and notable from Dallas), preceded those from another major city following a commercial break. Participants in live rounds were determined by two separate votes, while the public decided the first four to advance, and the judges chose the fifth participant to join them (from those who placed 5th and 6th respectively in the public vote). The remaining changes included an expanded number of participants for the "Las Vegas Callback" stage of auditions, along with cosmetic updates to the program. Alongside a new title card, the judges' table and the red "Xs" were re-styled to match the design of those used in Britain's Got Talent.

Results episodes for this season were arranged on a sporadic schedule alongside live episodes, rather than a pre-ordained arrangement after the last two seasons. Quarter-finals had their results announced on the same day. Semi-finals and the knockout final among the top ten were done the day after the performance episode had been broadcast. The grand-finale's results were aired a week after the performance episode.

Forty of the participants who auditioned for this season secured a place in the live quarter-finals, with ten quarterfinalists performing in each show. About twenty from these rounds advanced and were split between the two semi-finals, with around ten semi-finalists securing a place in the final, and five finalists securing a place in the season's grand-finale. These are the results of each participant's overall performance during the season:

Winner | Runner-up | Third place | Finalist
Semi-finalist | Quarter-finalist

| Participant | Genre | Act | Quarter-final | Result |
|---|---|---|---|---|
| Beyond Belief Dance Company | Dance | Dance Group | 2 | Eliminated |
| Bruce Block | Magic | Magician | 3 | Eliminated |
| Bryan Cheatham | Singing | Singer | 4 | Eliminated |
| Dallas Desperados Dancers | Dance / Acrobatics | Cheerleading Group | 4 | Eliminated |
| Daniel Jens | Singing / Music | Singer & Guitarist | 2 | Semi-finalist |
| DC Cowboys | Dance | Dance Group | 1 | Eliminated |
| Derrick Barry | Variety | Britney Spears Impersonator | 1 | Eliminated |
| Donald Braswell II ^{1} | Singing | Singer | 4 | Grand-finalist |
| Dorae Saunders | Variety | Tina Turner Impersonator | 4 | Eliminated |
| Eli Mattson | Singing / Music | Singer & Pianist | 4 | Runner-up |
| Elite | Acrobatics | Martial Artist | 1 | Eliminated |
| Extreme Dance FX | Dance | Clogging Group | 1 | Semi-finalist |
| Flambeaux | Danger | Fire Breather | 4 | Eliminated |
| George the Giant | Danger | Sideshow Performer | 2 | Eliminated |
| Indiggo | Singing | Vocal Duo | 4 | Eliminated |
| Jessica Price | Singing / Music | Singer & Guitarist | 1 | Finalist |
| Jonathan Arons | Music | Trombonist | 2 | Eliminated |
| Jonathan Burkin | Variety | Baton Twirler | 3 | Semi-finalist |
| Joseph Hall | Singing | Elvis Impersonator | 3 | Finalist |
| Kaitlyn Maher | Singing | Singer | 4 | Finalist |
| Kazual | Singing | Vocal Group | 2 | Eliminated |
| Matthew Piazzi | Comedy | Impressionist | 3 | Eliminated |
| Michael Strelo-Smith | Singing | Singer | 3 | Eliminated |
| Neal E. Boyd | Singing | Opera Singer | 1 | Winner |
| Nuttin' But Stringz | Music | Violin Duo | 4 | Third place |
| Paul Salos | Singing | Frank Sinatra Impersonator | 2 | Finalist |
| Queen Emily | Singing | Singer | 2 | Grand-finalist |
| Ronny B | Singing / Dance | Singer & Dancer | 1 | Eliminated |
| Sarah Lenore | Singing / Music | Singer & Guitarist | 3 | Semi-finalist |
| Shequida Hall | Singing | Opera Singer | 3 | Eliminated |
| Shimshi | Magic | Magician | 1 | Eliminated |
| Sick Step | Dance | Dance Group | 3 | Semi-finalist |
| Slippery Kittens | Dance | Dance Group | 2 | Eliminated |
| Taubl Family | Music | Orchestra | 3 | Semi-finalist |
| The Cadence | Music | Percussion Group | 1 | Semi-finalist |
| The James Gang | Singing | Vocal Group | 1 | Semi-finalist |
| The Tapping Dads | Dance | Tap Dance Group | 4 | Semi-finalist |
| The Texas State Strutters | Dance | Dance Group | 3 | Eliminated |
| The Wright Kids | Music | Bluegrass Band | 2 | Finalist |
| ZOOperstars! | Dance | Dance Group | 2 | Semi-finalist |

- ^1 This act was originally eliminated during the bootcamp stage, but was advanced into the contest, via a public vote, after another act was forced to step down for medical reasons.

=== Quarter-final summary ===
Buzzed Out | Judges' choice | Advanced to Semi-finals
Won Judges' Vote | Lost Judges' Vote

==== Quarter-final 1 (August 26) ====
| Quarter-Finalist | Order | Buzzes and Judges' Vote | | | Result |
| Quarter-Finalist | Order | Hasselhoff | Osbourne | Morgan | Result |
|---|---|---|---|---|---|
| Extreme Dance FX | 1 | | | | Advanced |
| The James Gang | 2 | ^{2} | | | Won Judges' Vote |
| Derrick Barry | 3 | | | | Eliminated |
| Elite | 4 | ^{2} | | | Lost Judges' Vote |
| Ronny B | 5 | | | | Eliminated |
| The Cadence | 6 | | | | Advanced |
| Jessica Price | 7 | | | | Advanced |
| Shimshi | 8 | | | | Eliminated |
| DC Cowboys | 9 | | | | Eliminated |
| Neal E. Boyd | 10 | | | | Advanced |

- ^2 Because of the majority vote for The James Gang, Hasselhoff's voting intention was not disclosed as a result.

==== Quarter-final 2 (August 27) ====
| Quarter-Finalist | Order | Buzzes and Judges' Vote | | | Result |
| Quarter-Finalist | Order | Hasselhoff | Osbourne | Morgan | Result |
|---|---|---|---|---|---|
| Beyond Belief Dance Company | 1 | | | | Lost Judges' Vote |
| Paul Salos | 2 | | | | Advanced |
| Kazual | 3 | | | | Eliminated |
| ZOOperstars! | 4 | | | | Won Judges' Vote |
| The Wright Kids | 5 | | | | Advanced |
| Jonathan Arons | 6 | | | | Eliminated |
| Daniel Jens | 7 | | | | Advanced |
| Slippery Kittens | 8 | | | | Eliminated |
| George the Giant | 9 | | | | Eliminated |
| Queen Emily | 10 | | | | Advanced |

==== Quarter-final 3 (September 2) ====
| Quarter-Finalist | Order | Buzzes and Judges' Vote | | | Result |
| Quarter-Finalist | Order | Hasselhoff | Osbourne | Morgan | Result |
|---|---|---|---|---|---|
| The Texas State Strutters | 1 | | | | Eliminated |
| Michael Strelo-Smith | 2 | | | | Lost Judges' Vote |
| Bruce Block | 3 | | | | Eliminated |
| Shequida Hall | 4 | | | | Eliminated |
| Taubl Family | 5 | | | | Advanced |
| Jonathan Burkin | 6 | | | | Advanced |
| Sarah Lenore | 7 | | | | Advanced |
| SickStep | 8 | | | | Won Judges' Vote |
| Matthew Piazzi | 9 | | | | Eliminated |
| Joseph Hall | 10 | | | | Advanced |

==== Quarter-final 4 (September 3) ====
| Quarter-Finalist | Order | Buzzes and Judges' Vote | | | Result |
| Quarter-Finalist | Order | Hasselhoff | Osbourne | Morgan | Result |
|---|---|---|---|---|---|
| Dallas Desperados Dancers | 1 | | | | Eliminated |
| Bryan Cheatham | 2 | | | / | Lost Judges' Vote |
| Flambeaux | 3 | | | | Eliminated |
| Kaitlyn Maher | 4 | | | | Advanced |
| Dorae Saunders | 5 | | | | Eliminated |
| Donald Braswell II | 6 | | | | Advanced |
| Indiggo | 7 | | | | Eliminated |
| The Tapping Dads | 8 | | | | Won Judges' Vote |
| Eli Mattson | 9 | | | | Advanced |
| Nuttin' But Stringz | 10 | | | | Advanced |

=== Semi-final summary ===
Buzzed Out | Judges' choice | Advanced to Finals
Won Judges' Vote | Lost Judges' Vote

==== Semi-final 1 (September 9) ====
| Semi-Finalist | Order | Buzzes and Judges' Vote | | | Result (September 11) |
| Semi-Finalist | Order | Hasselhoff | Osbourne | Morgan | Result (September 11) |
|---|---|---|---|---|---|
| The Cadence | 1 | | | | Eliminated |
| Queen Emily | 2 | | | | Advanced |
| The Wright Kids | 3 | | | | Advanced |
| The James Gang | 4 | | | | Eliminated |
| Daniel Jens | 5 | | | | Lost Judges' Vote |
| ZOOperstars! | 6 | | | | Eliminated |
| Neal E. Boyd | 7 | | | | Advanced |
| Jessica Price | 8 | | | / | Won Judges' Vote |
| Extreme Dance FX | 9 | | | | Eliminated |
| Paul Salos | 10 | | | | Advanced |

==== Semi-final 2 (September 10) ====
- Guest performer: Terry Fator

| Semi-Finalist | Order | Buzzes and Judges' Vote | | | Result (September 11) |
| Semi-Finalist | Order | Hasselhoff | Osbourne | Morgan | Result (September 11) |
|---|---|---|---|---|---|
| SickStep | 1 | | | | Eliminated |
| Donald Braswell II | 2 | | | | Advanced |
| Joseph Hall | 3 | | | | Won Judges' Vote |
| Taubl Family | 4 | | | | Eliminated |
| Sarah Lenore | 5 | | | | Eliminated |
| Nuttin' But Stringz | 6 | | | | Advanced |
| Kaitlyn Maher | 7 | | | | Advanced |
| The Tapping Dads | 8 | | | | Eliminated |
| Eli Mattson | 9 | | | | Advanced |
| Jonathan Burkin | 10 | | | | Lost Judges' Vote |

=== Finals summary ===
Winner (Top 5 Final Only) | Runner-up (Top 5 Final Only) | 3rd place (Top 5 Final Only)
Advanced (Top 10 Finals only) | Eliminated | Buzzed Out (Top 10 Finals only)

==== Final - Top 10 (September 17) ====
- Guest Performer, Results Show: Natasha Bedingfield

| Top 10 Finalist | Order | Buzzes | | | Result (September 18) |
| Top 10 Finalist | Order | Hasselhoff | Osbourne | Morgan | Result (September 18) |
|---|---|---|---|---|---|
| Paul Salos | 1 | | | | Eliminated |
| Kaitlyn Maher | 2 | | | | Eliminated |
| Donald Braswell II | 3 | | | | Advanced |
| Jessica Price | 4 | | | | Eliminated |
| Joseph Hall | 5 | | | | Eliminated |
| Neal E. Boyd | 6 | | | | Advanced |
| The Wright Kids | 7 | | | | Eliminated |
| Queen Emily | 8 | | | | Advanced |
| Nuttin' But Stringz | 9 | | | | Advanced |
| Eli Mattson | 10 | | | | Advanced |

==== Grand-finale (September 24) ====
| Grand-finalist | Order | Result (October 1) |
|---|---|---|
| Nuttin' But Stringz | 1 | 3rd |
| Donald Braswell II | 2 | 4th |
| Neal E. Boyd | 3 | 1st |
| Eli Mattson | 4 | 2nd |
| Queen Emily | 5 | 5th |

== Ratings ==
| Show | Rating | Rating/Share (18–49) | Viewers (millions) |
|---|---|---|---|
| 1 | 7.8 | 3.8/10 | 12.80 |
| 2 | 7 | 3.1/9 | 11.51 |
| 3 | 7.5 | 3.2/10 | 11.98 |
| 4 | 7.6 | 3.3/9 | 12.40 |
| 5 | 7.8 | 3.1/9 | 12.53 |
| 6 | 7.8 | 3.3/10 | N/A |
| 7 | 7.9 | 3.6/10 | 13.61 |
| 8 | 7.8 | 3.5/10 | 12.42 |
| 9 | N/A | 2.7/8 | 8.57 |
| 10 | N/A | 3.1/9 | 10.96 |
| 11 | N/A | 2.7/8 | 10.13 |
| 12 | N/A | 6.5/10 | 10.58 |
| 13 | N/A | 2.7/7 | 10.15 |
| 14 | 7.1 | 2.6/10 | 11.60 |
| 15 | N/A | 2.5/8 | 11.49 |
| 16 | N/A | 2.3/8 | 9.64 |
| 17 | N/A | 3.1/9 | 12.05 |
| 18 | N/A | 2.3/7 | 9.83 |
| 19 | 6.6 | 2.7/7 | 10.23 |
| 20 | 7.7 | 3.3/8 | 12.55 |
