= Genevieve Hannelius =

American actress and singer

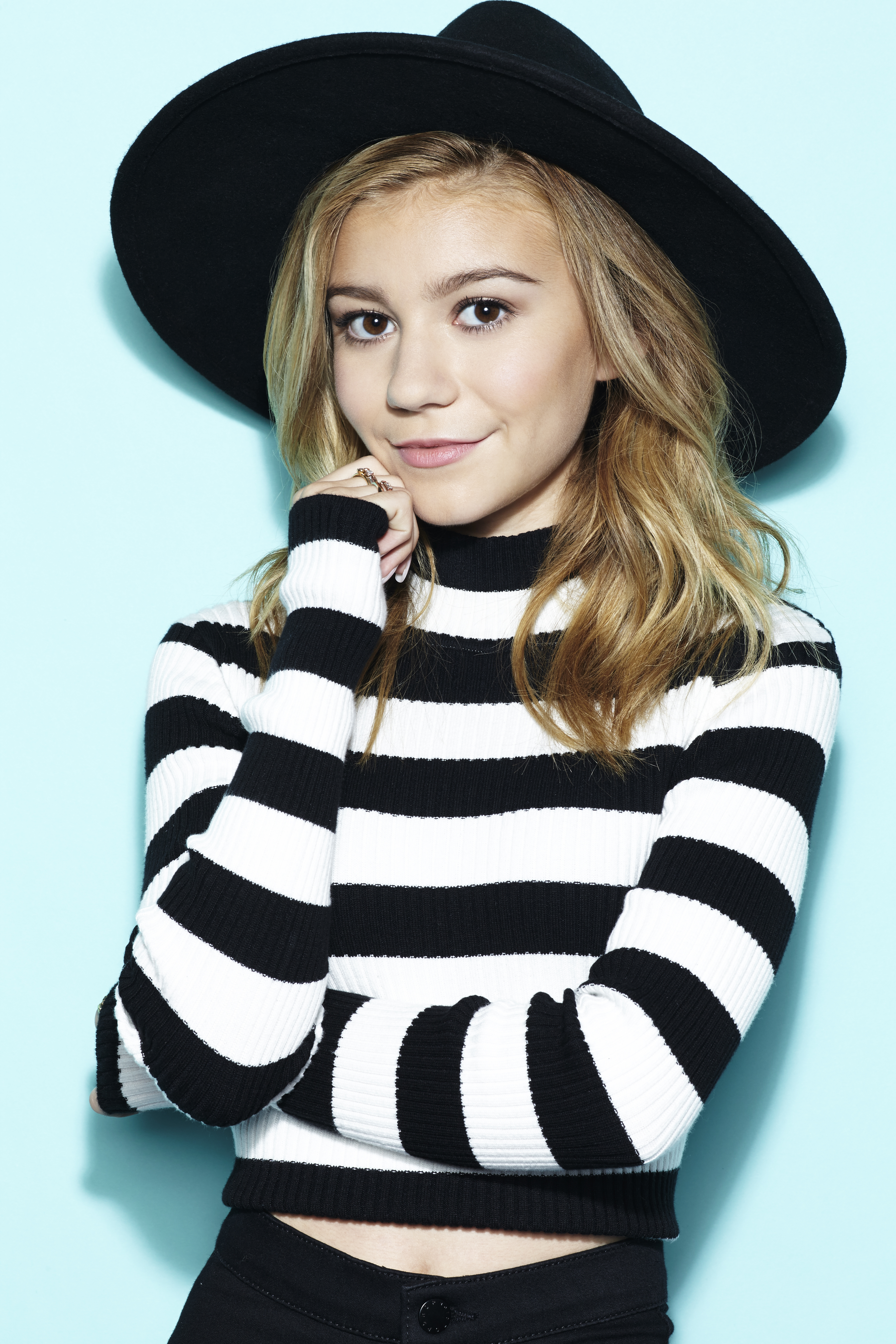
- Hannelius in 2015
- Born: Genevieve Knight Hannelius; December 22, 1998 (age 27); Boston, Massachusetts, U.S.
- Education: Sarah Lawrence College (BA)
- Occupations: Actress; singer
- Years active: 2006–present (acting)
- Website: https://genevievehannelius.com

Genevieve Knight Hannelius (born December 22, 1998) is an American actress and singer who made her acting debut starring as Courtney Patterson on the ABC series Surviving Suburbia (2009). She had recurring roles on the Disney Channel series Sonny with a Chance (2009–2010) and Good Luck Charlie (2010–2011), and soon received recognition for her role as Avery Jennings in the Disney Channel sitcom Dog with a Blog (2012–2015). She has also voiced Rosebud in the Air Buddies film series (2011–2013) and starred as Christa Carlyle in the crime series American Vandal (2017).

== Early life ==
Genevieve Knight Hannelius was born on December 22, 1998, in Boston, Massachusetts to Eric and Karla (née Knight) Hannelius. Her father is Swedish. She moved to Yarmouth, Maine at the age of three, and then moved to Los Angeles at the age of nine with her family to pursue acting. She is an alumna of the Los Angeles-based Young Actor's Studio. She graduated from Sierra Canyon School in May 2017. She graduated from Sarah Lawrence College in 2021. In January 2022, Hannelius moved to New York City, New York.

== Acting career ==
As a child, Hannelius had roles in theater, which include playing Madeline in the Children's Theater of Maine's production of Madeline's Rescue in summer 2006 and Jenny in Tales of a Fourth Grade Nothing with Children's Theatre of Maine and Maine State Music Theater. She began acting portraying Courtney Patterson on the sitcom Surviving Suburbia, playing the daughter of Bob Saget's character.

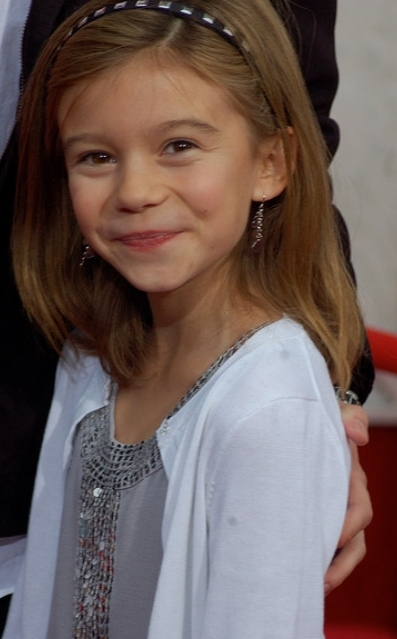
Hannelius at the Hannah Montana: The Movie premiere in 2009

Hannelius had a recurring role on the Disney Channel original series Sonny with a Chance as Dakota Condor, a guest role on Hannah Montana as a fan named Tiffany, and a recurring role on Good Luck Charlie as Jo Keener. She also played Emily Pearson in the Disney Channel movie Den Brother in 2010, and voiced the character Rosebud in Spooky Buddies (2011), Treasure Buddies (2012), and Super Buddies (2013).

In February 2011, she was cast for a lead role in the pilot of the High School Musical spin-off series Madison High, however the pilot was not picked up to series. In 2012, Hannelius was cast as Avery Jennings on the Disney Channel series Dog with a Blog, which premiered in October of that same year and ran until 2015; on average, it attained millions of viewers per episode. In 2014, she guest starred as Mad Mack on the Disney Channel series Jessie, and voiced Lady Joy on the Disney Junior series Sofia the First.

In 2017, Hannelius starred as Christina Carlyle in the Netflix mockumentary crime series American Vandal, which received critical acclaim and earned a Primetime Emmy Award nomination. In 2019, she starred in an online interactive series titled "Timeline". In 2020, she starred as Heather in the direct-to-video horror film Day 13. In 2022, she had a supporting role in the Netflix film Along for the Ride. In 2023, she starred in the comedy film Sid is Dead.

== Other ventures ==
Hannelius is an avid supporter of the anti-domestic violence charity organization A Window Between Worlds, and hosted its annual fundraising event, "Art in the Afternoon", several times beginning in 2013.

In 2015, Hannelius launched a customized nail-wrap app titled "Make Me Nails". Hannelius stated that she was inspired to create the app because she "wanted to make nail art more accessible for young people". She elaborated: "I was doing my own nail-art tutorials, and I could see that my fans were recreating my designs, and that was so cool to me. I wanted to take that to the next level and really give them something more personal." In 2019, Hannelius created G Polish, a brand of cruelty-free vegan nail polish.

== Filmography ==
=== Film ===
Year	Title	Role	Notes	Ref.
2009	Black & Blue	Zoe		
2010	The Search for Santa Paws	Janie		
2011	Spooky Buddies	Rosebud	Voice role	
2012	Treasure Buddies	Rosebud	Voice role	
2012	Santa Paws 2: The Santa Pups	Charity	Voice role	
2013	Super Buddies	Rosebud	Voice role	
2020	Day 13	Heather		
2022	Along for the Ride	Leah		
2023	Sid is Dead	Tiff		

=== Television ===
Year	Title	Role	Notes	Ref.
2009	Surviving Suburbia	Courtney Patterson	Main role	
2009	Hannah Montana	Tiffany	Episode: "Jake... Another Little Piece of My Heart"	
2009	Rita Rocks	Brianna Boone	Episode: "Why Can't We Be Friends?"	
2009–2010	Sonny with a Chance	Dakota Condor	Recurring role (seasons 1–2), 6 episodes	
2010	Den Brother	Emily Pearson	Disney Channel Original Movie	
2010–2011	Good Luck Charlie	Jo Keener	Recurring role (seasons 1–2), 4 episodes	
2011	I'm in the Band	Ms. Dempsey	Episode: "Iron Weasel: The Video Game"	
2011	Love Bites	Maddy Tinnelli	Episode: "TMI"	
2012–2015	Dog with a Blog	Avery Jennings	Lead role	
2013	Fish Hooks	Amanda	Voice role Episode: "A Charity Fair to Remember"	
2014	Jessie	Mackenzie	Episode: "Creepy Connie 3: The Creepening"	
2014	Sofia the First	Lady Joy	Voice role Episode: "Sofia the Second"	
2014–2015	Wander Over Yonder	Little Bits	Voice role Episodes: "The Stray" & "The Catastrophe"	
2016	Roots	Missy Waller	Television miniseries Episode: "Part 2"	
2017	American Vandal	Christa Carlyle	6 episodes	
2019	Timeline	Marti	Main role	

=== Theater ===
Stage performances by Genevieve Hannelius
Year	Title	Role	Venue	Notes
2024	Shit. Meet. Fan.	Sam	MCC Theater	Off-Broadway

== Discography ==
=== Extended plays ===
Title	Details
Girlhood	Released: January 16, 2026; Format: Digital download, streaming, CD; Label: Self-released

=== Singles ===
Title	Year	Album
"Staying Up All Night"	2011	Non-album singles
"Two in a Billion"	2011	Non-album singles
"Just Watch Me"	2011	Non-album singles
"Sun in My Hand"	2012	Non-album singles
"Paper Cut"	2012	Non-album singles
"Stay Away"	2014	Non-album singles
"Moonlight"	2014	Non-album singles
"4:45"	2014	Non-album singles
"Friends Do"	2014	Non-album singles
"Lighthouse"	2016	Non-album singles
"Reckless"	2025	Girlhood
"James"	2025	Girlhood
"Girlhood"	2025	Girlhood
"Stay Away" (2025 version)	2025	Non-album single
"The Woods"	2026	Girlhood
