= Santa Paws =

Book series

Santa Paws is a book series that was first published in 1996. The first books were written by Nicholas Edwards; the newer books are written by Kris Edwards. To date, there have been nine books. Books from the series are in over 500 libraries, according to WorldCat.

== Theme ==
The books are about a German Shepherd mix dog named Santa Paws who rescues people who need help. The series takes place in Oceanport, Massachusetts. He was adopted by the Callahan family. The family consists of:

- Mrs. Callahan, the mom, who teaches physics at Oceanport High School also a strict but loving mom towards the Callahan family.
- Mr. Callahan, the dad, who writes books. He loves to listen to Frank Sinatra and has a habit of wearing his slippers in public.
- Patricia, a high school student who is a bit of a tomboy and yet loves to be classy at the same time. She is very sarcastic but enjoys ice hockey.
- Gregory, a middle school student who is the one who first found Santa Paws. He plays basketball at middle school but upon entering high school, he plays football.
- Santa Paws, who is the dog who rescues people when they are about to be hurt or are in need of help.
- Evelyn, a cranky old tiger cat who loves to take naps.
- Abigail, a cat who is initially stray, rescued near the end of the third book and is with the family starting with the fourth. She often scratches people.

== List of books ==
1. Santa Paws (1996)
2. The Return of Santa Paws (1997)
3. Santa Paws, Come Home (1999)
4. Santa Paws To the Rescue (2000)
5. Santa Paws, Our Hero (2002)
6. Santa Paws and the New Puppy (2003)
7. Santa Paws Saves the Day (2004)
8. Santa Paws and the Christmas Storm (2005)
9. Santa Paws on Christmas Island (2006)

== See also ==
- The Search for Santa Paws
- Santa Paws 2: The Santa Pups
