= Danny Woodburn =

American actor (born 1964)

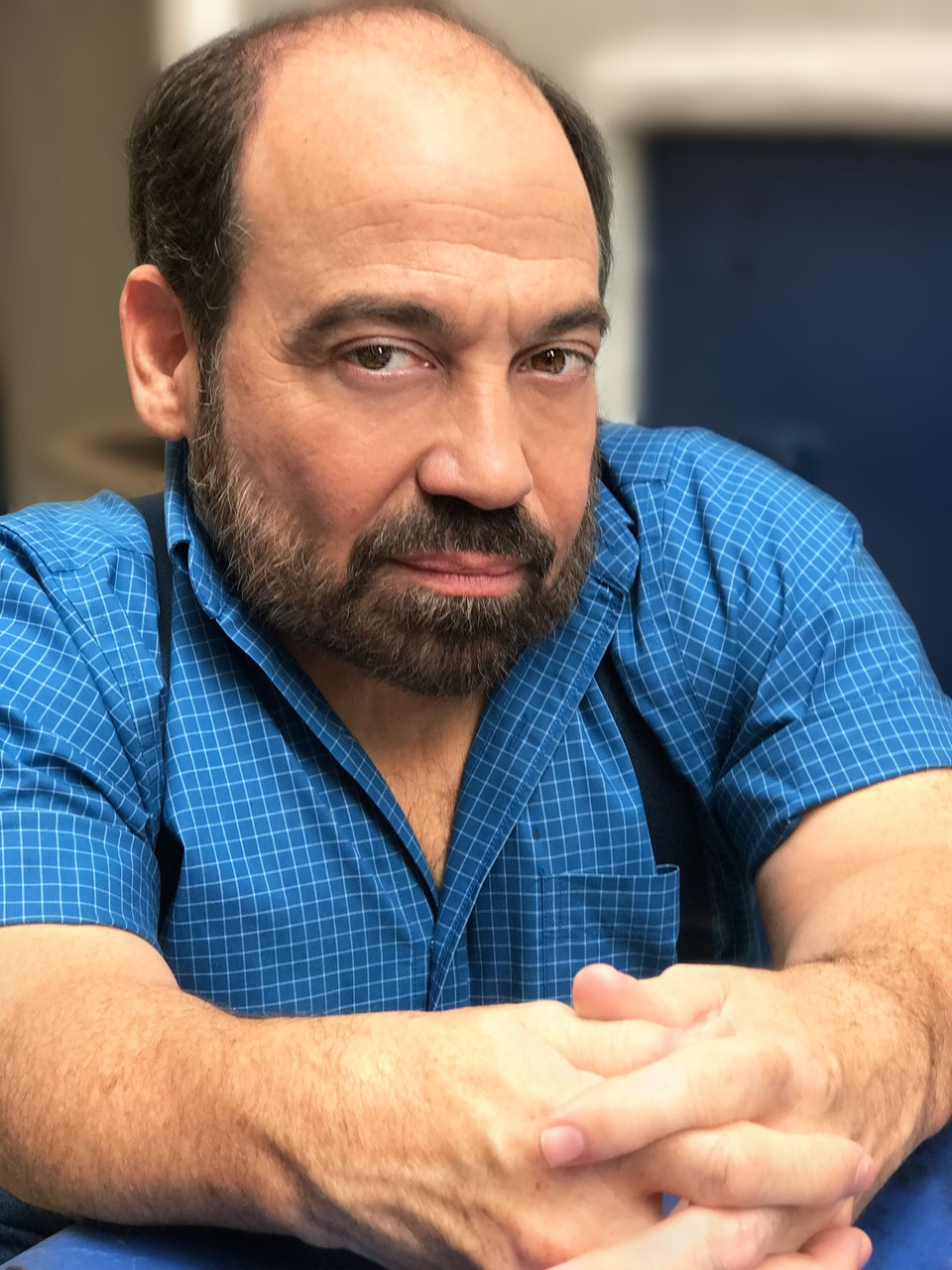
- Woodburn in 2017
- Born: July 26, 1964 (age 62); Philadelphia, Pennsylvania, U.S.
- Education: Temple University
- Occupations: Actor; comedian; activist
- Years active: 1985–present
- Spouse: Amy Buchwald (m. 1998)

Danny Woodburn (born July 26, 1964) is an American actor, comedian and activist for the disability rights movement linked to his dwarfism.

He played Mickey Abbott on the sitcom Seinfeld. He has more than 150 television and 30 film appearances to date.

== Early life and education ==
Woodburn was born on July 26, 1964, in Philadelphia, Pennsylvania. He is a graduate of Abington Senior High School in Abington Township, Montgomery County, Pennsylvania and Temple University School of Communications and Theater. He received the school's Outstanding Alumni Achievement Award in 2001.

== Career ==
=== Stage ===
Woodburn appeared in numerous stage productions before moving to Los Angeles, such as The Indian Wants the Bronx (by Israel Horovitz); Scapino; David Mamet's Revenge of the Space Pandas; and a touring company production of Viet Rock. His debut in the New York theater world began with The Soda Jerk.

=== Stand-up comedy ===
A stand-up comedian for over 20 years, Woodburn has performed nationwide. He has headlined at comedy clubs which include The Improv, the Comedy Store, Gotham Comedy Club, Carolines on Broadway, The Ice House, and the Laugh Factory.

=== Television actor ===
Woodburn starred as "Professor Pixel" in Fox's 1992 Halloween special, Count DeClues' Mystery Castle, which was shot at The Magic Castle nightclub in Los Angeles.

Of his more than 150 TV appearances, Woodburn has had numerous starring and reoccurring roles on recognized network shows, beginning with his turns as Mickey Abbott on the multi-Emmy winning series Seinfeld. He starred on the 1997 series Conan the Adventurer (as Otli, Conan's sidekick); Special Unit 2 as Carl; and multiple return appearances on Passions; The Bold and the Beautiful; Tracey Takes On...; Baywatch; Early Edition, Murder She Wrote; Charmed; Becker; Bones;. Additionally there were numerous guest-starring roles on such shows Hunter; Lois and Clark: The New Adventures of Superman; The Pretender; Angel; CSI; Veronica's Closet; 8 Simple Rules; Monk; and Jane the Virgin.

He has guest starred on such children's television shows as The Suite Life of Zack & Cody; iCarly; Cory in the House; Nicky, Ricky, Dicky & Dawn; and Bizaardvark. He appeared regularly as Mr. Poulos on Crash & Bernstein.

In "Pixtopia", an episode of Disney Channel's Star vs. the Forces of Evil starring Eden Sher, he guest-voiced the pixie task master.

=== Film roles ===
Woodburn has appeared in the films Jingle All the Way; Things You Can Tell Just by Looking at Her; The Flintstones in Viva Rock Vegas; Death to Smoochy; Employee of the Month; Watchmen; Mirror Mirror; and The Identical. He also appeared in the children's feature series Santa Buddies, The Search for Santa Paws, and Santa Paws 2: The Santa Pups. He performed the motion capture for Splinter in Teenage Mutant Ninja Turtles, with the voice of Splinter being supplied by Tony Shalhoub.

== Filmography ==
=== Film ===
Year	Title	Role	Notes
1994	The Magic of the Golden Bear: Goldy III	Hugo	
1995	Lord of Illusions	Forensic Photographer	Uncredited
1996	Jingle All the Way	Tony	
2000	Things You Can Tell Just by Looking at Her	Albert	
2000	The Flintstones in Viva Rock Vegas	Little Rocko	
2002	Death to Smoochy	Angelo Pike	
2004	Blue Demon	Lawrence Van Allen	
2006	Employee of the Month	Glen Ross	
2009	Watchmen	Big Figure	Uncredited
2009	Santa Buddies	Eli	
2010	The Search for Santa Paws	Eli	
2012	Mirror Mirror	Grimm	
2012	Bad Ass	Master Sluggy Kornnuts	
2012	Santa Paws 2: The Santa Pups	Eli	
2014	Teenage Mutant Ninja Turtles	Splinter	Motion-capture performance
2014	The Identical	Damon	
2018	Puppy Stars Christmas	Eli Elf	
2020	Faith Based	Jimmy	

=== Television ===
Year	Title	Role	Notes
1992–93	Murder, She Wrote	Various	3 episodes
1994–98	Seinfeld	Mickey Abbott	Recurring Role; 7 episodes
1994, 1998	Baywatch	Benny, Herbert Crane,	Episodes: Silent Night Baywatch Night: Parts 1–2; Friends Forever
1995	Lois & Clark: The New Adventures of Superman	Big Buster Williams	Episode: Resurrection
1996–97	Tracey Takes On...	Mitch Gibson	Recurring Role; 6 episodes
1997–98	Conan the Adventurer	Otli	Main role
2001–02	Special Unit 2	Carl	Main Role; All episodes
2002–03	Charmed	Head Dwarf	3 episodes
2003	Angel	Creature	Episode: "The Magic Bullet"
2005	One Tree Hill	Marty	Episode: How a Resurrection Really Feels
2006	The Suite Life of Zack & Cody	Blop	Episode: Boston Holiday
2006–14	Bones	Alex Radziwill	Recurring Role
2007	Monk	Little Willie	Episode: Mr. Monk Is on the Air
2008	Cory in the House	Mr. McNamara	Episode: Who Let the Dolls Out
2008	iCarly	Mitch	Episode: iChristmas
2010	Party Down	Tim	Episode: Jackal Onassis Backstage Party
2012–14	Crash & Bernstein	Martin Poulos	Recurring Role
2015	Nicky, Ricky, Dicky & Dawn	Gayle	Episode: Go Hollywood
2015	Star vs. the Forces of Evil	Pixie Taskmaster (voice)	Episode: "Pixtopia"
2016	Bizaardvark	Pyro Steve	Episode: Bernie's in Charge
2017	The Bold and the Beautiful	Kenny	Recurring Role
2020	Legacies	Pig	Episode: Facing Darkness Is Kinda My Thing
2021	The Neighborhood	Mayor Clyborne	Episode: Welcome to the Sister from Another Mister
2021	Station 19	Tobias	Episode: "Searching for the Ghost"
2022	Willow	Additional voices	Episode: "The High Aldwin"
2022	Willow	Wiggleheim (voice)	Episode: "Prisoners of Skellin"
2023	Billions	Judge William Rucker	Episode: "Game Theory Optimal"
2023–24	Bookie	Petey	3 episodes
2025	The Witcher	Zoltan Chivay	7 episodes
TBA	God of War †	Brok	

=== Commercial work ===
Woodburn was featured in a series of ads for Burger King's BK Stacker sandwiches.

== Advocacy ==
Woodburn is an advocate for disabled and little people issues. He serves on the Screen Actors Guild "Performers with Disabilities Committee." Throughout his career as both a comic and an actor he chose to avoid the stereotyping of little people as sight gags or props. Gaining the respect of his peers has allowed him to actively pursue change within his profession for all disabled performers. He has been recognized for the change of attitudes and societal perceptions of not only people with dwarfism but of all disabled persons. He was awarded the DREAM Award by the Disability Rights Legal Center in 2009 for those efforts in TV and film as well as the 2010 Screen Actors Guild Harold Russell Award. He was keynote speaker at 2010 RespectAbility Conference and the Inclusion Network of Cincinnati, and has been active as both teacher and speaker for The Little People's Research Fund, Actors For Autism, Media Access, American Association of People with Disabilities and the National ReelAbilities film festivals. He discussed some of his experiences as a little person, both on- and offscreen, in an interview with ABILITY Magazine in 2015.

== Personal life ==
Woodburn is married to Amy Buchwald, an actress, writer, and comedian. She appeared in an episode of Conan the Adventurer as Woodburn's character's love interest.
