= Adam Alexi-Malle =

Italian actor

- Born: September 24, 1964 (age 61); Siena, Tuscany, Italy
- Occupation: Actor
- Years active: 1995–present

Adam Alexi-Malle is an Italian actor.

== Life and career ==
Alexi-Malle was born in Siena, Italy. His father is from Italy (Sardinian) and his mother is Palestinian-Spanish. They emigrated to London, England first, and later to the United States.

As musician, he began performing at the age of 9, intent on a career as a concert pianist and violinist having trained with Dorothy DeLay and Raphael Bronstein and at the Conservatoire de Paris, the Moscow Conservatory, the Juilliard School and the American Ballet Theatre. In the early 1990s, following a course at the Royal Academy of Dramatic Arts in London, he began his acting career.

He has appeared in such films as Bowfinger, The Man Who Wasn't There, Hidalgo, Celebrity, and Failure to Launch; and on television in numerous guest-starring roles, including in The Sopranos, The West Wing, Alias, and 24.

On stage, he has performed in the Tony Award-winning and nominated Broadway productions of Titanic and The Threepenny Opera. He starred opposite Sam Rockwell and Cara Seymour in the critically acclaimed Off-Broadway premiere of Mike Leigh's Goose-Pimples with The New Group theatre in New York City, garnering nominations as Outstanding Featured Actor from both the Drama Desk and the Outer Critics Circle Awards.

Alexi-Malle has stated that he is fluent in Italian, French, Spanish, Russian and Arabic. He has additionally worked as a voice artist for Late Night with David Letterman, Family Guy and has done voice-overs in video games such as The Bourne Conspiracy, Diablo 3 and Assassin's Creed: Revelations. He is a staff audiobook narrator for Penguin Random House Audio having voiced numerous titles including, "The Second Empress", "Letters from Skye", "The Anatomy Lesson", "I Will Never See The World Again", "White Bird - A Wonder Story", and "POV - Point of View".

Alexi-Malle is the founding owner and CEO of the multimedia production company JP²A²M:worldwide Entertainment Group which includes the subsidiary production entities, Siena Films and virtuosoTV as well as the theatre company, Blistering Muses.

== Filmography ==
=== Film ===
Year	Title	Role	Notes
1996	Night Falls on Manhattan	Democratic Delegue	Uncredited
1996	The Preacher's Wife	Robbery Witness	Uncredited
1997	The Peacemaker	Arab Sheik in Airport	Uncredited
1998	Celebrity	DS Worker	Uncredited
1999	Bowfinger	Afrim	
2000	Midnight Gospel	Lionel	Short Film
2001	Peroxide Passion	Shorty	
2001	The Man Who Wasn't There	Jacques Carcanogues	
2001	A.I. Artificial Intelligence	Crowd Member	
2004	Hidalgo	Aziz	
2006	Failure to Launch	Mr. Axelrod	
2012	Treasure Buddies	Amir	Direct-to-video film
2014	Mr. Peabody & Sherman	French Peasant (voice)	

=== Television ===
Year	Title	Role	Notes
2000	The Sopranos	College Representative	Episode: "The Happy Wanderer"
2000	Judging Amy	Health Store Owner	Episode: "Not with a Whimper"
2000	Gideon's Crossing	Dr. Ankh	Episode: "Father Knows Best"
2001	The West Wing	President's Translator	Episode: "The War at Home"
2002	Undeclared	Professor Burg	Episode: "Jobs, Jobs, Jobs"
2003	Alias	Bernard	Episode: "The Two"
2005	24	Joseph Fayed	2 episodes
2007–2008	Go, Diego, Go!	Jamal the Camel (voice)	2 episodes
2010	Nova	Mahroos	Episode: "Building Pharaoh's Ship"
2011	Family Guy	Adzin (voice)	Episode: "Stewie Goes for a Drive"

=== Video games ===
Year	Title	Role	Notes
2004	The Chronicles of Riddick: Escape from Butcher Bay	Izz-udeen / Waman / Shurik	Credited as Adam Alexi Malle
2008	The Bourne Conspiracy	Additional voices	
2011	Assassin's Creed: Revelations	Constantinople Vendor / Assassin Recruit / Civilian	
2012	Diablo III	Additional Voices	
2012	Assassin's Creed III: Liberation	Additional Voices	
2012	Call of Duty: Black Ops - Declassified	Russian Leader	
2014	Diablo III: Reaper of Souls	Additional Voices	

== Theatre ==
- Goose-Pimples
- Titanic
- Sakharam Binder
- Terrorism
- The Three Sisters
- The Threepenny Opera

== Discography ==
- Titanic (musical) – Original Cast Album (Varèse Sarabande)
- Nellie McKay: Normal as Blueberry Pie – A Tribute to Doris Day (credited as Paolo Perre) (Verve)
- Love Song – The Kinsey Scale (band) featuring Paolo Perre (Autonomous Records UK)

== Awards and nominations ==
- Legacy Poetry Prize – 2014 – Book – Poetry, "A Confederacy of Joy" by the Siena Press under birth name, Juan-Paolo Perre
- Tony Awards – Original Broadway Cast : Titanic (musical) – Best Musical, Best Original Score, Best Book of a Musical, Best Orchestrations, Best Scenic Design
- Drama Desk Award – Outstanding Featured Actor in a Play for "Goose-Pimples" – The New Group – 1998
- Outer Critics Circle Award – Outstanding Featured Actor in a Play for "Goose-Pimples" – 1998
