= The Search for Santa Paws =

- Disney release poster
- Directed by: Robert Vince
- Written by: Robert Vince; Anna McRoberts
- Based on: Characters by Paul Tamasy; Aaron Mendelsohn; Kevin DiCicco; Robert Vince; Anna McRoberts
- Produced by: Anna McRoberts; Robert Vince
- Starring: Zachary Gordon; Mitchel Musso; Kaitlyn Maher; Madison Pettis; Richard Riehle; Genevieve Hannelius; Richard Kind; Jason Connery; Christopher Massey
- Cinematography: Kamal Derkaoui
- Edited by: Kelly Herron
- Music by: Brahm Wenger
- Production company: Keystone Entertainment
- Distributed by: Walt Disney Studios Home Entertainment
- Release date: November 23, 2010
- Running time: 96 minutes
- Countries: United States; Canada
- Language: English

The Search for Santa Paws is a 2010 Christmas adventure fantasy film released on November 23, 2010. The title is the tenth film in the Air Bud franchise and is also a prequel to Santa Buddies, as well as a spin-off from the Air Buddies film franchise.

== Plot ==
Santa Claus receives a letter and gift informing him of the death of Mr. Hucklebuckle, a toy store owner and member of the "Santa Cause", an organization of delegates encouraging Christmas spirit worldwide.

In New York City, Mr. Hucklebuckle's grandson James and his wife Kate arrive at his toy store and their caseworker Mr. Stewart informs them that they must run the store profitably for one Christmas season to gain ownership. They decide to hire a store Santa to bring in customers, intending to sell the store afterwards.

Meanwhile, an orphan named Quinn arrives at an orphanage run by Gladys Stout, a strict woman who disapproves of Christmas. As such, she steals toys and destroys them with her incinerator. Despite this, Quinn befriends the other girls, including the oldest Willamina "Will", who lost her Christmas spirit after her own parents' deaths.

To cheer Santa up, his head elf Eli uses the great Christmas icicle to bring the stuffed dog to life. Santa names the puppy Paws and they become best friends. At the orphanage, Quinn witnesses Ms. Stout confiscating a doll belonging to another orphan named Janie and incinerating it.

Santa and Paws travel to New York to visit Hucklebuckle's, landing in Central Park gaining the attention of Gus, a homeless man who follows them. On the streets, Santa bumps into Ms. Stout, falls into the street, and is hit by a cab, becoming separated from Paws. Gus takes Santa's magic crystal, resulting in him losing his memories. After wandering the streets, Santa finds Hucklebuckle Toys the next morning where he is taken in by James and Kate as their store Santa. Unable to remember his name, he calls himself "Bud" due to Gus calling him so during their encounter.

When Stout leaves for a hair appointment, Will sneaks out to the Hucklebuckle toy store and reluctantly brings Quinn. Will admires a bike on display. After Quinn sees Santa, Kate invites her to sit on his lap. She asks for Will to have the bike she wants and a puppy to cheer up the girls at the orphanage. After leaving, Quinn is convinced that he is the real Santa.

After wandering the streets, Paws befriends three stray dogs named Haggis, Rasta, and T-Money, who (after stealing from a deli) are captured by Franklin, a dogcatcher and Ms. Stout's boyfriend. Paws uses magic to rescue them, and they vow to help find Santa, hoping to get off the naughty list.

Ms. Stout catches the girls, and after Quinn reveals an insult Will said, Stout punishes Will by making her spend the night in the basement without dinner. Will is upset that new kids always get her in trouble.

In Central Park, a Boy Scout named Jimmy finds the reindeer, who explain they need to find Santa and can't fly without him. That night, Quinn finds Paws in the alley and secretly brings him into the orphanage, promising to find Santa tomorrow. Will finds them but cannot hear Paws speak since she doesn't believe. Learning of the situation, Eli and his dog Eddy go to New York to find Santa.

Back at Hucklebuckle's, Santa starts regaining his memories. Quinn and Paws sneak out to Hucklebuckle's, but Paws sees James posing as Santa while he's on break. Paws realizes this before leaving and Quinn is in disbelief that Will was "right". Santa returns and meets Jimmy, who informs him that his reindeer are waiting. Santa is unsure if he is Santa, but gives Jimmy his North Pole pin for his persistence.

At the orphanage, Paws befriends the girls and uses magic to give them Christmas cheer, singing to help Will believe again. Ms. Stout discovers this and locks Will and Paws in the basement, stealing Paws' crystal and an ornament belonging to Quinn's late mother. Will hears Paws speak for the first time and regains her Christmas spirit, but without his crystal, Paws reverts to a stuffed animal the next morning. When Stout discovers this, she throws him in the incinerator before leaving with Franklin.

Back at Hucklebuckle Toys, Santa lands in the hospital after being without his crystal for a long time. Eli and Eddy find Gus, who admits to stealing it and feels remorse. Eli realizes that without his crystal, Santa could become mortal and eventually die. He leads them to the reindeer, who are too weak to fly and Gus agrees to help them while Eli and Eddy locate Paws.

They arrive at the orphanage when a shocked Quinn rescues Paws from the incinerator and reviving him. Jimmy arrives in the park, telling Comet of his endeavors. He meets Gus, who takes Jimmy to the orphanage to inform them of Santa's location. Will and Quinn come along with Haggis, Rasta, and T-Money. Eli commends Jimmy for helping and lets him keep the pin, dubbing him an official Santa's helper before he heads home. Ms. Stout and Franklin return to the orphanage, where they are greeted by Quinn's social worker, Mrs. Gibson, who has learned of the former's cruelty and neglect through a phone call from Eli. She is fired after receiving a court order from the state of New York, with Mrs. Gibson taking over the orphanage.

After explaining the situation to James and Kate, they rescue Santa and reunite him with his crystal, but its magic has depleted. Paws sacrifices his magic to heal Santa, reverting to his stuffed animal form. The next morning, Santa regains his health and he, Eli and Eddy rush back to the great Christmas icicle, which revives Paws as a full-grown dog named Santa Paws.

Back in New York, after returning Quinn and Will to the orphanage, James and Kate decide to adopt them. Haggis, Rasta, and T-Money stow away in a mail truck to the North Pole and become official elf dogs. Gus brings the money he received as a charity Santa to the orphanage, and Mrs. Gibson invites him to spend Christmas with them. Santa and Santa Paws visit the Hucklebuckles on Christmas Eve and return Quinn's mother's ornament to her.

On Christmas Day, James and Kate inform Mr. Stewart that they've decided to keep the store and continue the Hucklebuckle legacy. As Stewart leaves, he speaks to Hucklebuckle's spirit, wishing him Merry Christmas and telling him he got his wish.

== Cast ==
- Kaitlyn Maher as Quinn Hucklebuckle
- Madison Pettis as Willamina “Will” Hucklebuckle
- Richard Riehle as Santa Claus
- Wendi McLendon-Covey as Ms. Gladys Stout
- John Ducey as James Hucklebuckle
- Bonnie Somerville as Kate Hucklebuckle
- Danny Woodburn as Eli
- Chris Coppola as Augustus “Gus”
- Pete Gardner as Franklin
- Jonathan Morgan Heit as Jimmy
- Bill Cobbs as Mr. Stewart
- G. Hannelius as Janie
- Patrika Darbo as Mrs. Claus
- Michelle Creber as Taylor
- Kathryn Kirkpatrick as Mrs. Gibson
- Nicole Leduc as Meg
- Melody B. Choi as Mary

=== Voice cast ===
- Zachary Gordon as Paws
  - Mitchel Musso as Santa Paws
- Richard Kind as Eddy
- Diedrich Bader as Comet
- Michael Deyermond as Dancer
- Jason Connery as Haggis
- Christopher Massey as Rasta
- Josh Flitter as T-Money

== Reception ==
Angela Walker, writing for ChristianCinema.com, gave the DVD 3 stars out of 5, but said that the film fits the normal Disney DVD formula. She went on to say that the film was predictable and clichéd, but that kids would enjoy it and that the film adds to the "spirit of Christmas".

== Sequel ==
A sequel, Santa Paws 2: The Santa Pups, was released on November 20, 2012.

== See also ==
- List of Christmas films
- Santa Claus in film
- Santa Paws
