= Marlowe Peyton =

American singer and actor

- Born: Glendale, California, U.S.
- Occupations: Child actor, singer, songwriter
- Years active: 2008–present
- Website: www.marlowepeyton.com

Marlowe Peyton is an American actor and singer.

== Early life ==
Marlowe Peyton was born in Glendale, California, the younger of two children. They have an older sister named Merit Leighton, who is also an actress.

== Career ==
They began their career when they were four in The Back-up Plan. Since then, they have appeared as Lucy, cousin to the Heck family on The Middle; their performance was nominated for a Young Artist Award. They are also known for their guest star role on Jessie, playing the daughter of Coach Penny. Peyton is the voice of Jingle in Santa Paws 2: The Santa Pups from Disney and also played Tanner on ABC's The Neighbors. They previously starred opposite Finola Hughes, Shane Harper and Kathryn McCormick in Platinum the Dance Movie.

== Personal life ==
Peyton is non-binary and autistic.

== Filmography ==
Film/TV-show	Role	Episode
The Jay Leno Show	Kevin's Daughter	Television series (Episode #1.23)
The Back-up Plan	Lucy	Film
Parenthood	Theater kid	Television series (Episode "Opening Night")
Special Agent Oso: Three Healthy Steps	Emma	Television series (Episode "Make Orange Juice")
Conan	Birthday Kid	Television series (Episode "On This Day a Chump Was Born")
United States of Tara	Little Girl	Television series (Episode "Chicken 'n' Corn")
How I Met Your Mother	Kid	Television series (Episode "The Slutty Pumpkin Returns")
The Middle	Lucy (Guest Star)	Television series (Episode "Thanksgiving III")
Candybar	Samantha (Lead)	Award Winning Short Film
Applebaum	Sadie Wyeth (Series Regular)	Television Pilot (Director- Chris Columbus)
New Girl	Gracie	Television series (Episode "Menzies")
Santa Paws 2: The Santa Pups	Jingle (VO) (Lead)	Film
The Lost Medallion: The Adventures of Billy Stone	Foster Home Lisa	Film
The Neighbors	Tanner	Television series (Episode "Mo Purses Mo money Mo Problems")
Jessie	Madge (Guest Star)	Television series ("We Don't Need No Stinkin Badges")
Platinum the Dance Movie	London (Lead)	Film
Fresh Off the Boat	Reba	Television series, 4 episodes

== Awards and nominations ==
Award	Year	Category	Result	Role
Young Artist Award	2012	Best Performance in a TV Series Young Actress Age Ten or Younger	Nominated	Lucy in The Middle
