= Kaitlyn Maher =

American singer and actress (born 2004)

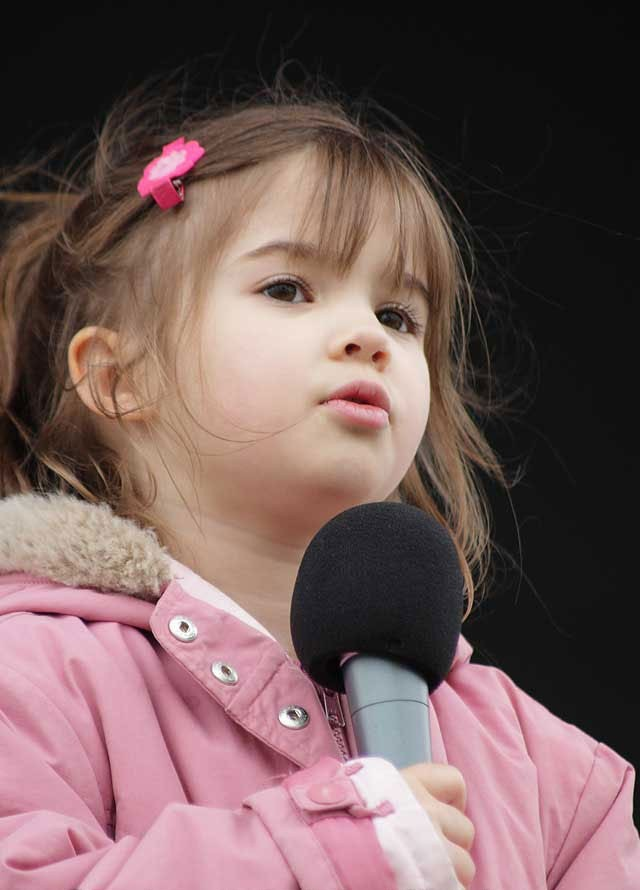
- Maher performing at the National Cherry Blossom Festival at the age of 5 in 2009

Background information
- Born: Kaitlyn Ashley Maher; January 10, 2004 (age 22); Novi, Michigan, U.S.
- Origin: Ashburn, Virginia, U.S.
- Genres: Pop, rock, religious
- Occupations: Singer, actress
- Years active: 2008–present (singer); 2009–present (actress)
- Label: Universal Music
- Website: kaitlynmaher.com

Kaitlyn Ashley Maher (born January 10, 2004) is an American singer and actress. She is known for being the Youngest Top 10 Finalist on America's Got Talent and for her roles in films such as The Search for Santa Paws, Santa Paws 2, Free Birds, and the PupStar series; as well as television shows such as FOX's The Goodwin Games and PBS' Mack and Moxy. She serves as the first-ever youth ambassador for the global nonprofit Compassion International and is a national debate champion, singer/songwriter, and global advocate.

In 2008, at the age of 4, Maher appeared on the third season of America's Got Talent and for her audition sang "Somewhere Out There". She reached the top 10 of AGT season 3, and was the youngest person to ever reach that level. Maher has since appeared live at The Great Kids Expo in Chantilly, Virginia, on October 25, 2008, a live broadcast of the 2008 lighting of the National Christmas Tree, on December 4, 2008, attended by President George W. Bush and over 7,000 guests, and the 2009 Cherry Blossom Festival on April 11, 2009, attended by First Lady Michelle Obama. On October 3, 2009, Maher was the opening act of The Addi and Cassi Hempel Fund benefit. Maher appeared in a Harris Teeter commercial airing during December 2008. She was also selected by Compassion International as its first ever Child Ambassador, visited children in El Salvador with Compassion, got to meet her sponsored child, and shot a music video to her title song "You Were Meant to Be." Maher has toured internationally and sang on behalf of special needs children for the nonprofit, Jill's House; for critically ill children at the National Institutes of Health Children's Inn; for wounded warriors at the Walter Reed National Military Medical Center; and for retired soldiers at the Veterans' Affairs Center in Washington, D.C.

Maher signed a recording deal late in 2009 with Indie Extreme for the release of her debut album You Were Meant To Be. The album was released December 15, 2009. Maher appeared in the Disney movie Santa Buddies as the voice for the character Tiny, which was released on November 24, 2009. Maher played the orphan Quinn in The Search for Santa Paws. She played Sarah Reynolds in Santa Paws 2: The Santa Pups. In 2013, Maher starred alongside T.J. Miller, Scott Foley, Becki Newton, and Beau Bridges as Piper Goodwin in the FOX TV series The Goodwin Games. She acted as the President's Daughter in Free Birds, alongside co-stars Amy Poehler, Owen Wilson, Woody Harrelson, and George Takei. From 2016 to 2019, she played the lead roles of both Tiny and Scrappy in AirBud's four-film PupStar series. She has acted in supporting roles in the Disney movie Treasure Buddies, the PBS TV series Mack and Moxy, the Disney series Disney's World of English, the Air Bud film Russell Madness, and subsequent 2020 film series Russell Maniac, among others.

Maher continues to write and release music, including her 2023 album "When Did We All Grow Up?" and subsequent singles "We Could Be" and "Fill It Up" in 2024.

== Early life and education ==
Maher was born Kaitlyn Ashley Maher in Novi, Michigan, on January 10, 2004, and raised in Ashburn, Virginia. To accommodate a demanding film and performance schedule, she was homeschooled until 9th grade, when she began attending The Potomac School. In high school, Maher competed on the USA Debate Team and captained her school's nationally ranked speech and debate team, placing first in the nation in Extemporaneous Debate at the 2021 National Speech and Debate Tournament. Passionate about public speaking and political advocacy, her writing has been published by The Aspen Institute, a leading global think tank. In 2023, it was announced that she was attending Duke University, she graduated in 2025.

== Career ==
=== America's Got Talent ===
Maher began her career on the third season of the American television reality show America's Got Talent, when she reached the top ten. Producers from the show first became aware of her from a video that was uploaded to YouTube. The video had been made after she had been asked to sing at a birthday party for one of her family members in Canada, and the video was later posted because her mother, Alison, was pregnant with her second child, and they could not travel to the country. Around Maher's fourth birthday, five months after the video had been made, her parents received an e-mail from AGT's Website on NBC.com, asking if their daughter would be able to audition for the show's third season in 2008.

==== Performances / Results ====
Week	Theme	Song choice	Original artist	Performance order	Result
Audition	N/A	"Somewhere Out There"	Linda Ronstadt; James Ingram	N/A	Advanced
Vegas Verdicts	Child performers	"When You Wish Upon a Star"	Cliff Edwards	2	Advanced
Top 40; Group 1	Semi-finals	"What a Wonderful World"	Louis Armstrong	4	Advanced
Top 20; Group 1	Heroes	"Beauty and the Beast"	Beauty and the Beast	7	Advanced
Top 10	N/A	"I'll Be There"	The Jackson 5	2	Eliminated

=== The Goodwin Games ===
In 2013, Maher joined the cast of The Goodwin Games in the role of Piper Goodwin, the daughter of Jimmy Goodwin (played by T.J. Miller).

=== Russell Madness ===
Maher provided the voice of Grace in Russell Madness, directed by Robert Vince. This film was released on February 21, 2015.

== Discography ==
- You Were Meant to Be (2009, Universal Music: 11 tracks)
- World Without You (2020, Single)
- When Did We All Grow Up? (2023, Album: 7 tracks)
- We Could Be (2024, Single)
- Fill It Up (2024, Single)

== Filmography ==
Year	Film	Role
2009	Santa Buddies	Tiny (voice)
2010	The Search for Santa Paws	Quinn
2012	Treasure Buddies	Cammy (voice)
2012	Santa Paws 2: The Santa Pups	Sarah Reynolds
2012	A Turtle's Tale 2: Sammy's Escape from Paradise	Ella (voice)
2013	The Goodwin Games	Piper Goodwin
2013	Free Birds	President's daughter (voice)
2015	Russell Madness	Grace (voice)
2016	Mack & Moxy	Trooper Kaitlyn (voice)
2016	Pup Star	Tiny (voice)
2017	Pup Star: Better 2gether	Tiny & Scrappy (voice)
2018	Pup Star: World Tour	Tiny & Scrappy (voice)
2018	Puppy Star Christmas	Tiny & Scrappy (voice)
