= BirdZerk! =

American prankster

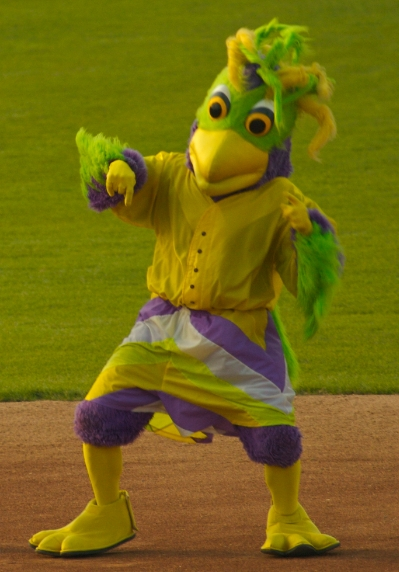
- BirdZerk! dancing in front of a crowd of baseball fans in 2011.
- Born: Dominic Latkovski
- Occupation: Sports entertainer
- Years active: 20
- Agent: TheSkillvilleGroup.com
- Known for: Baseball entertainment
- Notable work: Umpire dance, glove steal
- Title: America's Ballpark Prankster
- Website: BirdZerk.com

BirdZerk! is the performance name of Dominic Latkovski, a professional mascot and entertainer known for appearances at American minor league baseball games. He is most known for his skits that revolve around pranking players, umpires, bat boys, and managers and his acrobatic, synchronized dances with his sidekicks BirdZerk Jr., BabyZerk!, BallZerk!, and DogZerk!. In 2008, BirdZerk! was named as the top minor league baseball promotional act by CNBC sports business columnist Darren Rovell.

== History ==
BirdZerk! was created by brothers, Dominic and Brennan Latkovski in 1998. Dominic got his start in 1990 as Triple-A Louisville Redbirds mascot, Billy Bird. Over the course of the first two seasons, Dominic would have younger brother, Brennan, play the antagonist roles such as an umpire, for on-field skits. In 1992, the two brothers obtained a booth at the MLB Trade Show and marketed the Billy Bird act. After success in their first year, Dominic says, "[The Redbirds] wanted me to sign a contract giving them a big portion of the money in exchange for using the name and the costume, and that's when we decided to break free and create a new character." In came BirdZerk!, a neon green, yellow and purple bird based on the costume the brothers were accustomed to performing inside as their former act.

=== 1992 MLB Trade Show ===
In 1991, the Louisville Redbirds were host to the Triple-A All-Star Game. Dominic and Brennan were able to showcase their Billybird act to the league's decision makers during the game. A year and a half later, Dominic and Brennan were able to obtain a booth at the 1992 MLB Trade Show after Dominic, age 21 at the time, parlayed a $6,000 profit from scalping Garth Brooks tickets. At the trade show, they marketed Billybird as the "New Bird on the Block" and began taking bookings. That first year, 48 shows were booked from teams all around the United States, Canada, and Mexico. This was in addition to the 72 home games Billybird appeared at that season.
