= The Goodwin Games =

- Genre: Sitcom
- Created by: Carter Bays; Craig Thomas; Chris Harris
- Starring: Becki Newton; Scott Foley; T.J. Miller; Melissa Tang; Kat Foster
- Composer: John Swihart
- Country of origin: United States
- Original language: English
- No. of seasons: 1
- No. of episodes: 7

Production
- Executive producers: Chris Harris; Carter Bays; Craig Thomas; Peyton Reed
- Producers: Rachel Axler; Caroline James
- Cinematography: John Inwood; Joe Pennella
- Editors: Christopher Cooke; Wendy Smith
- Camera setup: Single-camera
- Running time: 22 minutes
- Production companies: Shiny Brass Lamp Productions; Bays Thomas Productions; 20th Century Fox Television

Original release
- Network: Fox
- Release: May 20 – July 1, 2013

The Goodwin Games is an American television sitcom that aired as a midseason replacement on Fox from May 20 to July 1, 2013. The show was created by Carter Bays and Craig Thomas (creators of How I Met Your Mother) alongside Chris Harris.

== Premise ==
The series revolves around a trio of estranged siblings living in New Hampshire, the Goodwins: Henry, the oldest child, is an overachieving surgeon with an overabundant ego; Chloe, the middle child, is a former child mathematical prodigy who became popular in high school and abandoned academia (and her friends) for a career as a struggling actress; and Jimmy, the youngest child, is a career petty criminal with a string of convictions who has to sneak into his pre-teen daughter's bedroom at night to visit her. The siblings return home for their father's funeral. His attorney (one of Chloe's abandoned childhood friends) April Cho informs them that their father's will awards them $23 million, but only if they agree to compete in a series of games of their father's devising. The games are designed to force them to confront their personal failings, recall their childhoods, and bring them together as a family once again. When the siblings resist, April informs them that their father anticipated their reaction, and therefore a fourth individual will be involved in the games, a complete stranger named Elijah, who collects part of the remaining inheritance every time the siblings fail to follow their father's instructions.

== Cast ==
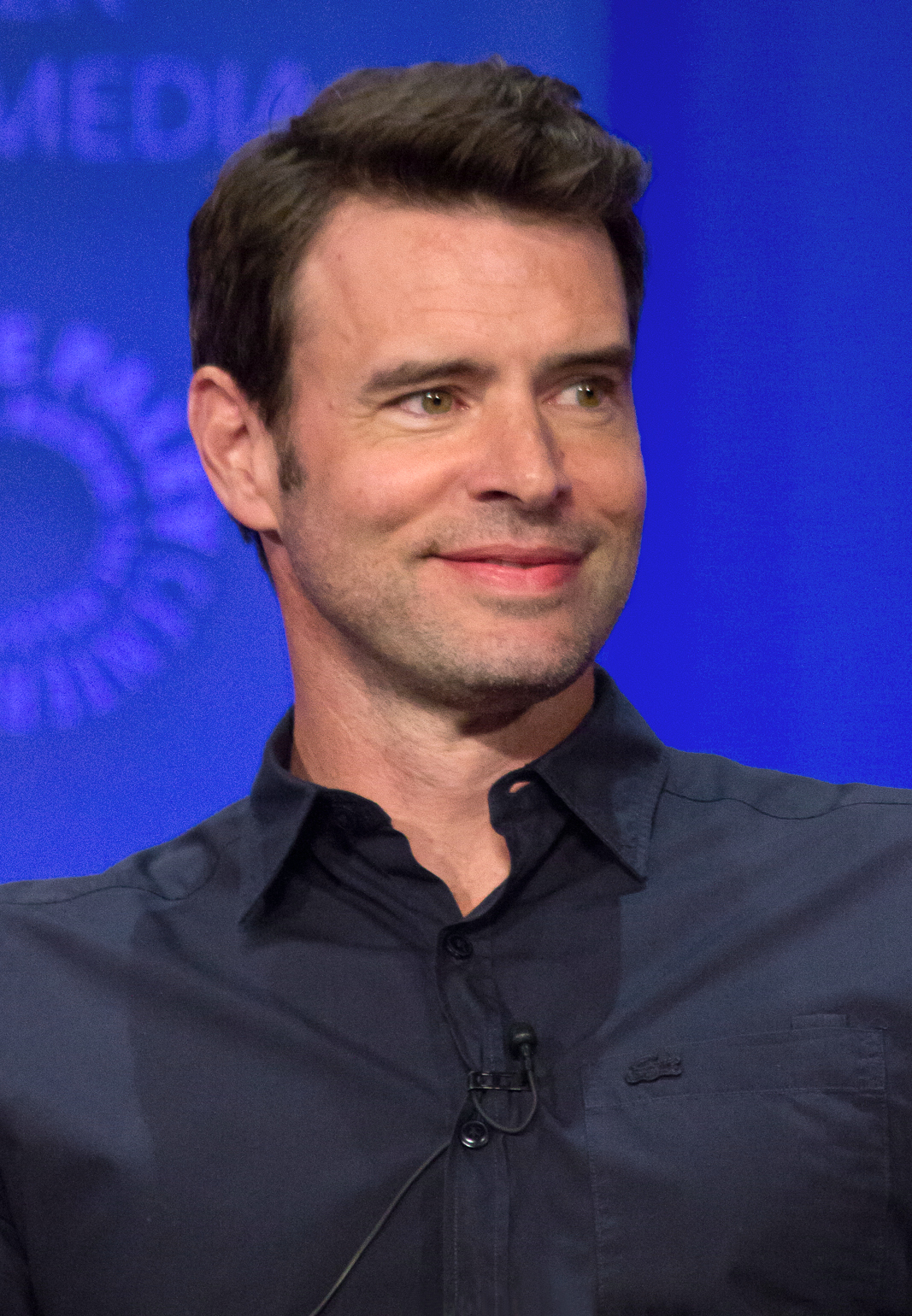
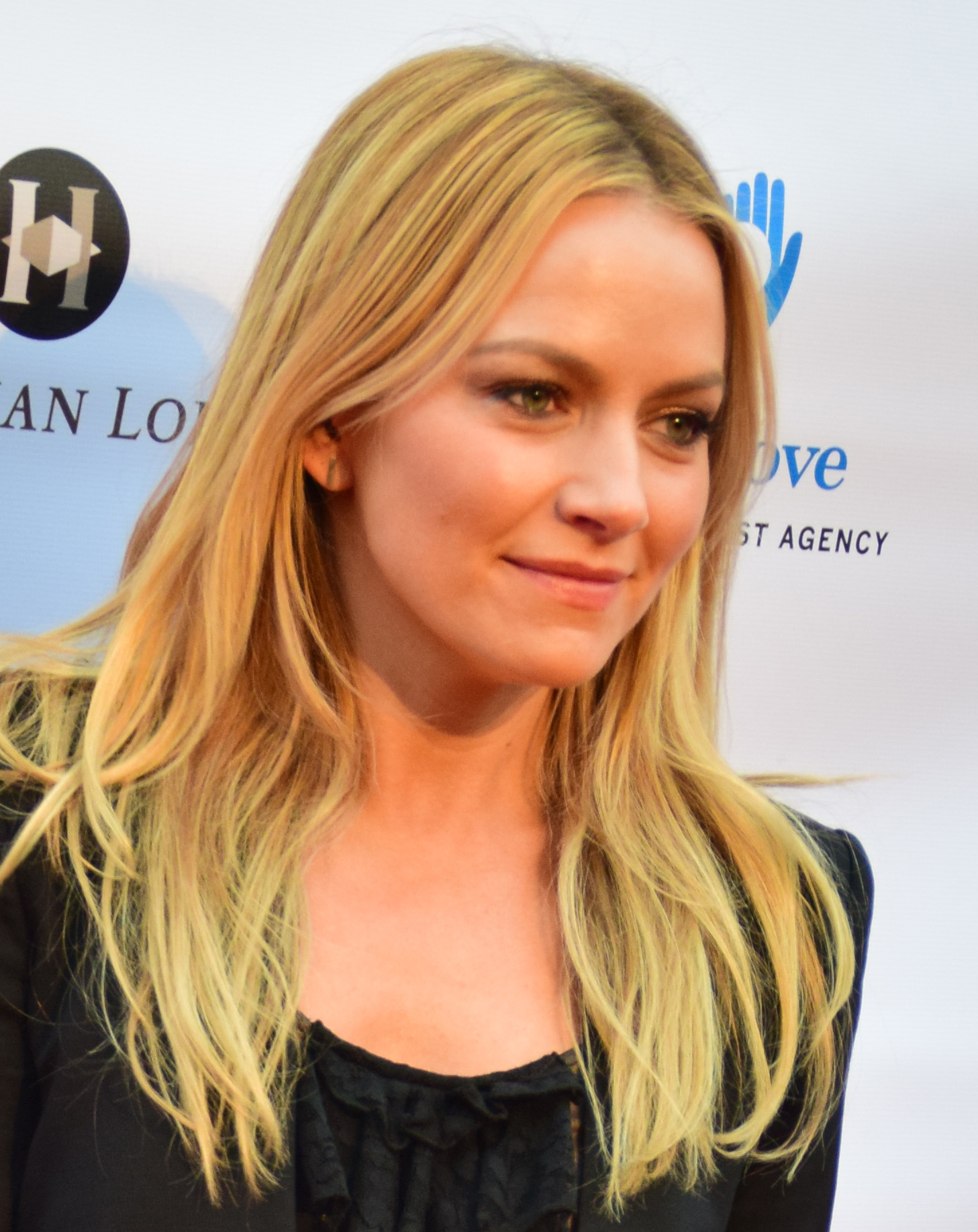
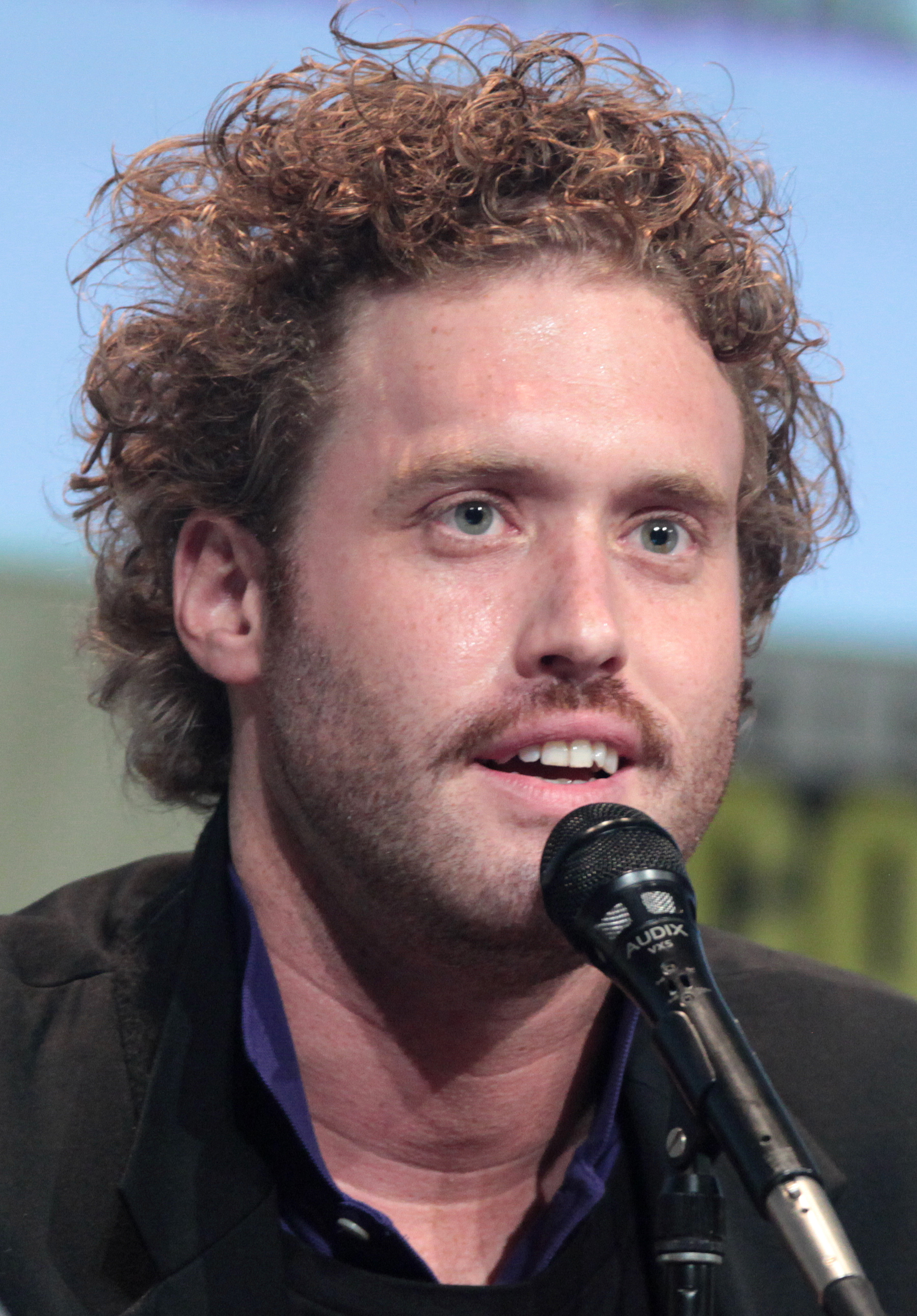
Scott Foley, Becki Newton and T.J. Miller portrayed the show's three titular characters.

=== Main cast ===
- Becki Newton as Chloe Goodwin
- Scott Foley as Henry Goodwin
- T.J. Miller as Jimmy Goodwin
  - (Jake Lacy in the original pilot)
- Kat Foster as Lucinda Hobbes
  - (Felisha Terrell in the original pilot)
- Melissa Tang as April Cho

=== Recurring ===
- Sabrina Carpenter as Young Chloe Goodwin
- Will Shadley as Young Henry Goodwin
- Jadon Sand as Young Jimmy Goodwin
  - (Gibson Bobby Sjobeck in the original pilot)
- Beau Bridges as Benjamin Goodwin
- Kaitlyn Maher as Piper Goodwin
  - (Francesca Capaldi in the original pilot)
- Jerrod Carmichael as Elijah
- Stefanie Black as Annie
- Laurie Metcalf as Dr. Richland
- Adam Rodriguez as Ivan
- Janina Gavankar as Hannah
- Chris Diamantopoulos as Chad
- William Edward Dagsher as Fisherman

== Production ==
On May 9, 2012, Fox placed a series order for the comedy that was expected to premiere during the 2012–13 television season as a mid-season entry. On June 7, 2012, it was announced that T.J. Miller was replacing Jake Lacy in the role of Jimmy. On November 2, 2012, it was announced that Fox cut the episode order from thirteen to seven.

== Episodes ==
No.	Title	Directed by	Written by	Original release date	Prod. code	U.S. viewers (millions)
1	"Pilot"	Peyton Reed	Chris Harris, Craig Thomas & Carter Bays	May 20, 2013	1AVW79	1.61
Henry, Chloe, and Jimmy Goodwin are brought together when their father, Benjamin, dies shortly after finishing his will video. At the will reading, it is revealed he has left a fortune of $23 million. When he sets the siblings a challenge, which he calls "The Goodwin Games", to complete a game of trivial pursuit, something that they have never seemed to accomplish, along with Elijah, someone hired by their father.
2	"Welcome Home, Goodwins"	Peyton Reed	Tom Ruprecht	May 27, 2013	1AVW01	1.37
The Goodwins are forced to be there for each other when they hear church bells.
3	"Small Town"	Jesse Peretz	Greg Schaffer	June 3, 2013	1AVW06	1.62
When Chloe sees Jimmy with a strange man, she suspects him of returning to his old ways.
4	"The Hamletta"	Peyton Reed	Carter Bays & Craig Thomas	June 10, 2013	1AVW02	1.54
Chloe goes back to college.
5	"The Birds of Granby"	David Katzenberg	Chris Harris	June 17, 2013	1AVW03	1.39
Jimmy reconnects with Piper's mother.
6	"Happy Hour"	John Putch	Christine Zander	June 24, 2013	1AVW04	1.50
Chloe and April spend a night at the bar with an old friend from Math Club. Jimmy performs songs that are maybe a little too autobiographical. Henry accidentally "sexts" his ex.
7	"The Box"	Neil Patrick Harris	Rachel Axler	July 1, 2013	1AVW05	1.49
Chloe becomes convinced that her father is controlling her life from beyond the grave, and her paranoia is infectious.

== Broadcast ==
The series premiered in Australia on Eleven on May 20, 2014.

== Reception ==
On Rotten Tomatoes, the series has an aggregate score of 38% based on 6 positive and 10 negative critic reviews. The website consensus reads: "The Goodwin Games is simply unimpressive in the most uninteresting ways." On Metacritic, the series has a score of 57 out of 100 based on 17 critic reviews, indicating "Mixed to Average"
