= Bruce Block =

American magician and ventriloquist

Bruce Block is a magician and ventriloquist.

== Early life ==
.

Block has appeared on America's Got Talent (seasons 2 and 3), The Tonight Show with Jay Leno and many more. His expertise is appreciated even by his peers. Scott Wells reviewed Block's appearance at the Texas Association of Magicians 2003 conference by stating "Bruce Block was perhaps the highlight of the evening...", His humor and juggling never missed..." and "Very clever and quite memorable". Bruce Block holds the world record for most cigar boxes balanced on his chin.

His special acts include escaping from a straitjacket, lying on a bed of nails and having a lady jump on him, ventriloquist act with his rabbit, making his or someone else's head vanish, juggling balls with his mouth, making a miniature horse appear in a box, and balancing hundreds of cigar boxes on his chin.

== Recognitions ==
- .
- .
