= Treasure Buddies =

2012 American family film

- DVD cover art
- Directed by: Robert Vince
- Written by: Anna McRoberts; Robert Vince
- Based on: Characters by Paul Tamasy; Aaron Mendelsohn; Kevin DiCicco; Robert Vince; Anna McRoberts
- Produced by: Anna McRoberts; Robert Vince
- Starring: Richard Riehle; Mason Cook; Adam Alexi-Malle; Lochlyn Munro; Mo Gallini; Christopher Maleki; Edward Herrmann; Skyler Gisondo; G. Hannelius; Ty Panitz; Charles Henry Wyson; Tucker Albrizzi; Tim Conway; Ryan Stiles; Elaine Hendrix; Maulik Pancholy; Aidan Gemme; Kaitlyn Maher; Bonnie Somerville
- Cinematography: Kamal Derkaoui
- Edited by: Jason Pielak
- Music by: Brahm Wenger
- Production company: Key Pix Productions
- Distributed by: Walt Disney Studios Home Entertainment
- Release date: January 31, 2012
- Running time: 93 minutes
- Country: United States
- Language: English

Treasure Buddies is a 2012 American adventure comedy film directed by Robert Vince and produced by Anna McRoberts. It is the 6th installment in the Air Buddies franchise. The Buddies head to the ruins of Ancient Egypt, where, with the help of a monkey named Babi and a camel named Cammy, they explore tombs, escape booby traps, and race against a Sphynx named Ubasti in search of treasure. It was released by Walt Disney Studios Home Entertainment on DVD, Blu-ray, and as a film download on January 31, 2012.

== Plot ==
The film opens with a pickpocketing monkey named Babi who tells his nephew, Babu how he met the Buddies. Their great uncle Digger was the partner of an archaeologist Thomas Howard, who retrieved one half of a dial which would lead to Queen Cleocatra's tomb. He never found the other half and retired. The scene then switches to present Fernfield where Thomas is giving his grandson Pete a tour of the Egyptian exhibit. The Buddies are also there. Pete stays behind with Thomas who gives his dog, Mudbud, Digger's bandanna. A British archaeologist, Phillip Wellington along with his cat, Ubasti, meets Thomas in his office and reveals that he has the other half of the dial. He insists on bringing him and Pete along for the ride, but refuses to bring along Mudbud due to his cat's certain allergies. Fortunately, the Buddies stow away in Phillip's DC-3 Douglas airliner via a box of TNT.

Once arriving in Egypt, the three meet Phillip's assistants Tarik and Seti, while the Buddies meet a young Babi (who stole Budderball's kebab) and a young camel calf named Cammy who Rosebud promises to help her find her mother.

The group began discovering clues to Cleocatra's tomb, but while doing so, Pete and Thomas learn that Phillip is a grave robber who seeks to get rid of them after they find the treasure in the tomb. The Buddies follow Pete, Thomas, and the others in a hot air balloon but are forced to take shelter in a cave when a sudden sandstorm strikes. The cave is revealed to be a passage to the tomb. There they meet and defeat Slither, a king cobra and protector of the tomb. Babi then abandons the Buddies due to cowardice.

Meanwhile after hiding out, Thomas and Peter discover the pyramid which was unveiled during the sandstorm and manage to gain entrance. After encountering several traps, which results in Seti's death, they discover Cleocatra's tomb. The Buddies arrive at the tomb, where B-Dawg takes the Collar of Cleocatra and puts it on, slowly turning into a cat in the process. They then fend off living cat statues using the traps they encountered earlier. B-Dawg eventually removes the collar and Ubasti manages to steal it.

Phillip challenges Thomas to a fierce duel after Ubasti is turned to stone after wearing Cleocatra's collar. Although he gains the upper hand, he is dazed when Peter slams a golden plate into his head. He escapes with the collar but is captured by the Nomads, tied to a camel, and (per request) is placed under the custody of the British Embassy. Thomas and Pete are declared national heroes along with the Buddies and the collar is put on permanent display in the museum in Fernfield.

== Cast ==
=== Live action ===
- Richard Riehle as Professor Thomas Howard
  - Tygh Runyan as Young Thomas
- Mason Cook as Pete Howard, Thomas's grandson and Mudbud's owner
- Adam Alexi-Malle as Amir Sabbagh
- Lochlyn Munro as Henry
- Edward Herrmann as Dr. Phillip Wellington
- Mo Gallini as Tarik
- Christopher Maleki as Seti
- Ranya Jaber as Farah
- Anna Primiani as Cleopatra

=== Voice ===
- Skyler Gisondo as B-Dawg
- G. Hannelius as Rosebud
- Ty Panitz as Mudbud
- Charles Henry Wyson as Buddha
- Tucker Albrizzi as Budderball
- Tim Conway as Deputy Sniffer
- Ryan Stiles as Slither, a mystical cobra.
- Elaine Hendrix as Ubasti, a Sphynx cat and the primary antagonist.
- Maulik Pancholy as Babi, a mischievous pick-pocketing capuchin monkey. He helps the Buddies look for Cammy's parents.
- Aidan Gemme as Babu, Babi's nephew
- Kaitlyn Maher as Cammy, a baby dromedary camel. She goes with the Buddies in order to look for her parents.
- Bonnie Somerville as Mala, a dromedary and Cammy's mother.

== Release ==
=== Home media ===
Treasure Buddies was released on DVD, Blu-ray, and as a film download on January 31, 2012. The physical release was produced in 2 different packages: a 2-disc Blu-ray / DVD combo pack and a 1-disc DVD. The film download was produced in both standard and high definition. Bonus features for the release included "DIGS: B-Dawg Edition" and a music video for "Roam".
