= Air Bud (series) =

American film franchise

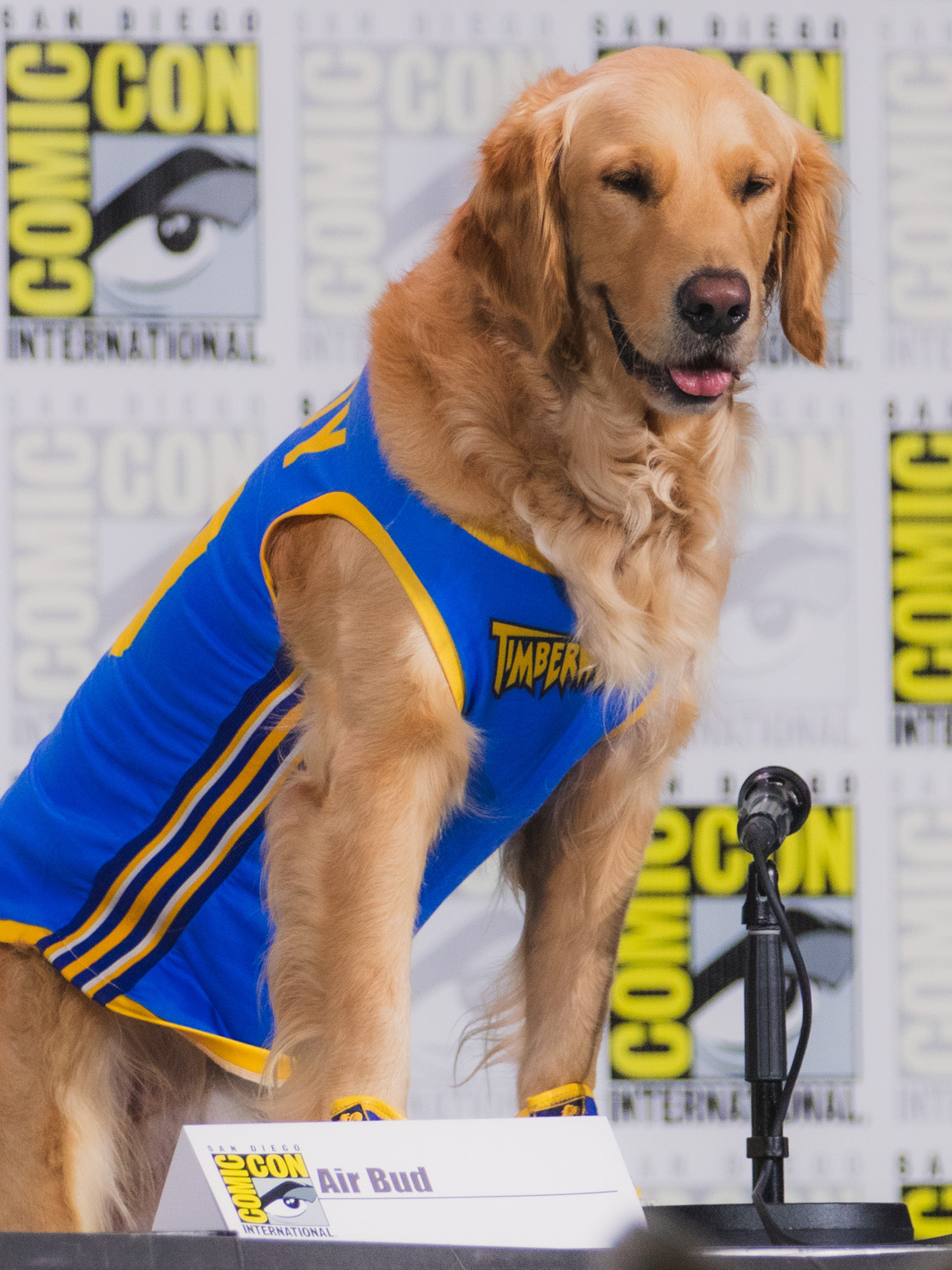
- Air Bud Returns Dog at the 2026 San Diego Comic-Con
- Original work: Air Bud (1997)
- Owners: Air Bud Entertainment (original films, Air Buddies and Air Bud Returns); The Walt Disney Company (all other films)
- Years: 1997–present

Films and television
- Films: Air Bud (1997); Air Bud: Golden Receiver (1998); Air Bud Returns (2027)
- Direct-to-video: Air Bud series: Air Bud: World Pup (2000); Air Bud: Seventh Inning Fetch (2002); Air Bud: Spikes Back (2003); Air Buddies series: Air Buddies (2006); Snow Buddies (2008); Space Buddies (2009); Santa Buddies (2009); Spooky Buddies (2011); Treasure Buddies (2012); Super Buddies (2013); Santa Paws series: The Search for Santa Paws (2010); Santa Paws 2: The Santa Pups (2012)

The Air Bud film series is an American film franchise based on a sports-playing Golden Retriever named Buddy, portrayed by Buddy. The franchise began in 1997 with the theatrical release of Air Bud, followed by the theatrical release of Air Bud: Golden Receiver in 1998. Following the box office failure of Golden Receiver, the rest of the films in the series were released in direct-to-video form. The Air Buddies or Disney Buddies spin-off series began in 2006 with the release of Air Buddies and it focuses on the adventures of Buddy's talking Golden Retriever puppies. The franchise features fourteen films (five of which were in the Air Bud series and seven in the Air Buddies series), in addition to two Christmas spin-offs of the Air Buddies series.

Disney Buddies is one of the top direct-to-DVD franchises, behind Disney Fairies at $300 million, with the first 12 films grossing $220 million by March 2014.

== History ==
Kevin DiCicco's Golden Retriever Buddy was featured on America's Funniest Home Videos and David Letterman's "Stupid Pet Tricks". In 1991, DiCicco approached production company Keystone Entertainment to produce Air Bud, a film based on Buddy. He also formed his production company, Air Bud Productions, that year. Disney's Miramax Films was brought on as the distribution company. Keystone indicated that no sequel was planned. The film did well in the home video market.

By April 1998, DiCicco and Robert Vince, the film's producer at Keystone, had a falling out, as Keystone and Vince had gone forward with a sequel, Air Bud: Golden Receiver, without DiCicco, who also claimed he wasn't paid anything for the first film and that he owns the Air Bud rights (based on the name of this production company name).

DiCicco bred three offspring of Buddy and trained them for sports like Buddy. The puppies were signed to an endorsement deal by DiCicco for Milk-Bone dog biscuits for puppies. He intended to make his own sequel, Air Bud: The Next Generation, which was scheduled to start production in the fall of 1999, with its concept being a "cross between Ferris Bueller and Home Alone".

Disney and William Morris Agency were sued in December 2011 over the Santa Paws films being unauthorized copies of a 1991 script for Santa Paws: The Story of Santa's Dog.

== Film series ==
Film	U.S. release date	Directed by	Screenplay by	Story by	Produced by	Refs.
Air Bud
Air Bud	August 1, 1997	Charles Martin Smith	Paul Tamasy & Aaron Mendelssohn	Paul Tamasy & Aaron Mendelssohn	Robert Vince and William Vince	
Air Bud: Golden Receiver	August 14, 1998	Richard Martin	Paul Tamasy & Aaron Mendelssohn	Paul Tamasy & Aaron Mendelssohn	Robert Vince	
Air Bud: World Pup	December 12, 2000	Bill Bannerman	Mike Whiting and Robert Vince & Anne Vince	Mike Whiting and Robert Vince & Anne Vince	Ian Fodie	
Air Bud: Seventh Inning Fetch	June 18, 2002	Robert Vince	Sara Sutton & Stephanie Isherwood and Anne Vince & Anna McRoberts	Robert Vince	Robert Vince and Anna McRoberts	
Air Bud: Spikes Back	June 24, 2003	Mike Southon	Anne Vince & Anna McRoberts	Robert Vince	Anna McRoberts, Robert Vince and Benjamin Kutz	
Air Bud Returns	January 22, 2027	Robert Vince	Robert Vince	Robert Vince	Robert Vince and Anna McRoberts	
Air Buddies
Air Buddies	December 12, 2006	Robert Vince	Anna McRoberts, Robert Vince and Phil Hanley	Anna McRoberts, Robert Vince and Phil Hanley	Anna McRoberts, Robert Vince and Phil Hanley	
Snow Buddies	February 5, 2008	Robert Vince	Robert Vince and Anna McRoberts	Robert Vince and Anna McRoberts	Robert Vince and Anna McRoberts	
Space Buddies	February 3, 2009	Robert Vince	Robert Vince and Anna McRoberts	Robert Vince and Anna McRoberts	Robert Vince and Anna McRoberts	
Santa Buddies	November 24, 2009	Robert Vince	Robert Vince and Anna McRoberts	Robert Vince and Anna McRoberts	Robert Vince and Anna McRoberts	
Spooky Buddies	September 20, 2011	Robert Vince	Robert Vince and Anna McRoberts	Robert Vince and Anna McRoberts	Robert Vince and Anna McRoberts	
Treasure Buddies	January 31, 2012	Robert Vince	Robert Vince and Anna McRoberts	Robert Vince and Anna McRoberts	Robert Vince and Anna McRoberts	
Super Buddies	August 27, 2013	Robert Vince	Robert Vince and Anna McRoberts	Robert Vince and Anna McRoberts	Robert Vince and Anna McRoberts	
Santa Paws
The Search for Santa Paws	November 23, 2010	Robert Vince	Robert Vince and Anna McRoberts	Robert Vince and Anna McRoberts	Robert Vince and Anna McRoberts	
Santa Paws 2: The Santa Pups	November 20, 2012	Robert Vince	Robert Vince and Anna McRoberts	Robert Vince and Anna McRoberts	Robert Vince and Anna McRoberts	

== Recurring cast and characters ==
List indicators

This section includes characters who will appear or have appeared in more than two films in the series.

- An empty grey cell indicates the character was not in the film, or that the character's official presence has not yet been confirmed.
- ^{V} indicates a voice-only role.

Characters	Air Bud film series						Buddies film series							Santa Paws film series	
Characters	Air Bud	Air Bud: Golden Receiver	Air Bud: World Pup	Air Bud: Seventh Inning Fetch	Air Bud Spikes Back	Air Bud Returns	Air Buddies	Snow Buddies	Space Buddies	Santa Buddies	Spooky Buddies	Treasure Buddies	Super Buddies	The Search for Santa Paws	Santa Paws 2: The Santa Pups
Buddy	Buddy	Rush Chase Zak Chance	Dakota Shooter Tango Walker Poacher	Dakota Shooter Tango Shaq Sniper	Bailey Brandy Charlie Walker	Charlie Summer	Tom Everett Scott^{V}	Tom Everett Scott^{V}							
Jackie Framm-Sullivan	Wendy Makkena	Cynthia Stevenson	Chilton Crane	Cynthia Stevenson	Cynthia Stevenson		Cynthia Stevenson	Cynthia Stevenson							
Josh Framm	Kevin Zegers	Kevin Zegers	Kevin Zegers	Kevin Zegers											
Tom Stewart	Shayn Solberg	Shayn Solberg	Shayn Solberg	Shayn Solberg											
Andrea Framm	Jessibelle and Katy Mather	Alyson MacLaren	Caitlin Wachs	Caitlin Wachs	Katija Pevec										
Dr. Patrick Sullivan		Gregory Harrison	Dale Midkiff	Richard Karn	Alf Humphreys		Richard Karn	Richard Karn							
Molly			Emma				Molly Shannon^{V}	Molly Shannon^{V}							
Noah Sullivan				Hannah Marof and Emma Marof	Jake D. Smith		Slade Pearce	Dylan Minnette							
Sheriff Bob				Patrick Cranshaw	Patrick Cranshaw		Patrick Cranshaw								
Budderball							Josh Flitter^{V}	Josh Flitter^{V}	Josh Flitter^{V}	Josh Flitter^{V}	Nico Ghisi^{V}	Tucker Albrizzi^{V}	Jeremy Shinder^{V}		
B-Dawg							Skyler Gisondo^{V}	Skyler Gisondo^{V}	Skyler Gisondo^{V}	Skyler Gisondo^{V}	Skyler Gisondo^{V}	Skyler Gisondo^{V}	Cooper Roth^{V}		
Buddha							Dominic Scott Kay^{V}	Jimmy Bennett^{V}	Field Cate^{V}	Field Cate^{V}	Charles Henry Wyson^{V}	Charles Henry Wyson^{V}	Tenzing Trainor^{V}		
Mudbud							Spencer Fox^{V}	Henry Hodges^{V}	Henry Hodges^{V}	Ty Panitz^{V}	Ty Panitz^{V}	Ty Panitz^{V}	Ty Panitz^{V}		
Rosebud							Abigail Breslin^{V}	Liliana Mumy^{V}	Liliana Mumy^{V}	Liliana Mumy^{V}	G Hannelius^{V}	G Hannelius^{V}	G Hannelius^{V}		
Deputy Sniffer							Don Knotts^{V}			Tim Conway^{V}	Tim Conway^{V}	Tim Conway^{V}	Tim Conway^{V}		
Eli										Danny Woodburn				Danny Woodburn	Danny Woodburn
Santa Claus										George Wendt				Richard Riehle	Pat Finn
Mrs. Claus														Patrika Darbo	Cheryl Ladd
Jacob						Aydin Artis									

- Note: A dark gray cell indicates the character does not appear in the film.

== Crew ==
Credited as	Air Bud film series						Spin-offs								
Credited as	Air Bud film series						Air Buddies film series							Santa Paws film series	
Credited as	Air Bud (1997)	Air Bud: Golden Receiver (1998)	Air Bud: World Pup (2000)	Air Bud: Seventh Inning Fetch (2002)	Air Bud: Spikes Back (2003)	Air Bud Returns (2027)	Air Buddies (2006)	Snow Buddies (2008)	Space Buddies (2009)	Santa Buddies: Here Comes Santa Paws/The Legend of Santa Paws (2009)	Spooky Buddies (2011)	Treasure Buddies (2012)	Super Buddies (2013)	The Search for Santa Paws (2010)	Santa Paws 2: The Santa Pups (2012)
Director	Charles Martin Smith	Richard Martin	Bill Bannerman	Robert Vince	Mike Southon	Robert Vince	Robert Vince								
Producer(s)	Robert Vince, Michael Strange, William Vince	Robert Vince	Ian Fodie	Anna McRoberts, Robert Vince		TBA	Anna McRoberts, Robert Vince								
Screenwriter(s)	Paul Tamasy, Aaron Mendelsohn		Mike Whiting, Robert Vince, Anne Vince	Sara Sutton, Stephanie Isherwood, Anne Vince, Anna McRoberts	Anne Vince, Anna McRoberts	Robert Vince	Anna McRoberts, Robert Vince, Phil Hanley	Robert Vince, Anna McRoberts							Robert Vince, Anna McRoberts, Philip Fracassi
Story by	Paul Tamasy, Aaron Mendelsohn		Mike Whiting, Robert Vince, Anne Vince	Robert Vince		Robert Vince	Anna McRoberts, Robert Vince, Phil Hanley	Robert Vince, Anna McRoberts							Robert Vince, Anna McRoberts, Philip Fracassi
Composer(s)	Brahm Wenger					TBA	Brahm Wenger		Brahm Wenger, Gregory Prechel	Brahm Wenger					
Cinematographer	Mike Southon		Cyrus Block	Steve Adelson	Mike Southon	TBA	Mike Southon	Kamal Derkaoui			Mike Southon	Kamal Derkaoui	Mark Irwin	Kamal Derkaoui	Mark Irwin
Editor(s)	Alison Vince	Bruce Lange, Melinda Seabrook	Kelly Herron, Laura Mazur	Kelly Herron, Jason Pielak		TBA	Kelly Herron, Jason Pielak	Kelly Herron				Jason Pielak	Kelly Herron		

== See also ==
- Gus (1976 film)
- MVP: Most Valuable Primate (2000 film)
