= Air Bud Returns =

- Theatrical release poster
- Directed by: Robert Vince
- Written by: Robert Vince
- Produced by: Anna McRoberts; Robert Vince
- Starring: Aydin Artis; Tracy Ifeachor; Edwin Lee Gibson; Tyler Labine; Erik Gow; Maxim Swinton
- Production company: Air Bud Entertainment
- Distributed by: Cineverse
- Release date: January 22, 2027
- Country: United States
- Language: English

Air Bud Returns is an upcoming American sports comedy drama film written and directed by Robert Vince. It is the 15th film in the Air Bud series, and the first Air Bud film to be released theatrically since Air Bud: Golden Receiver in 1998.

The film is scheduled to be released in the United States by Cineverse on January 22, 2027.

== Premise ==
12-year-old Jacob, coping with his father's death, moves with his mother to Fernfield, Washington. There, he finds a VHS copy of Air Bud and befriends a stray Golden Retriever named Buddy. Together, they join local children to form a basketball team and compete for a championship.

== Cast ==
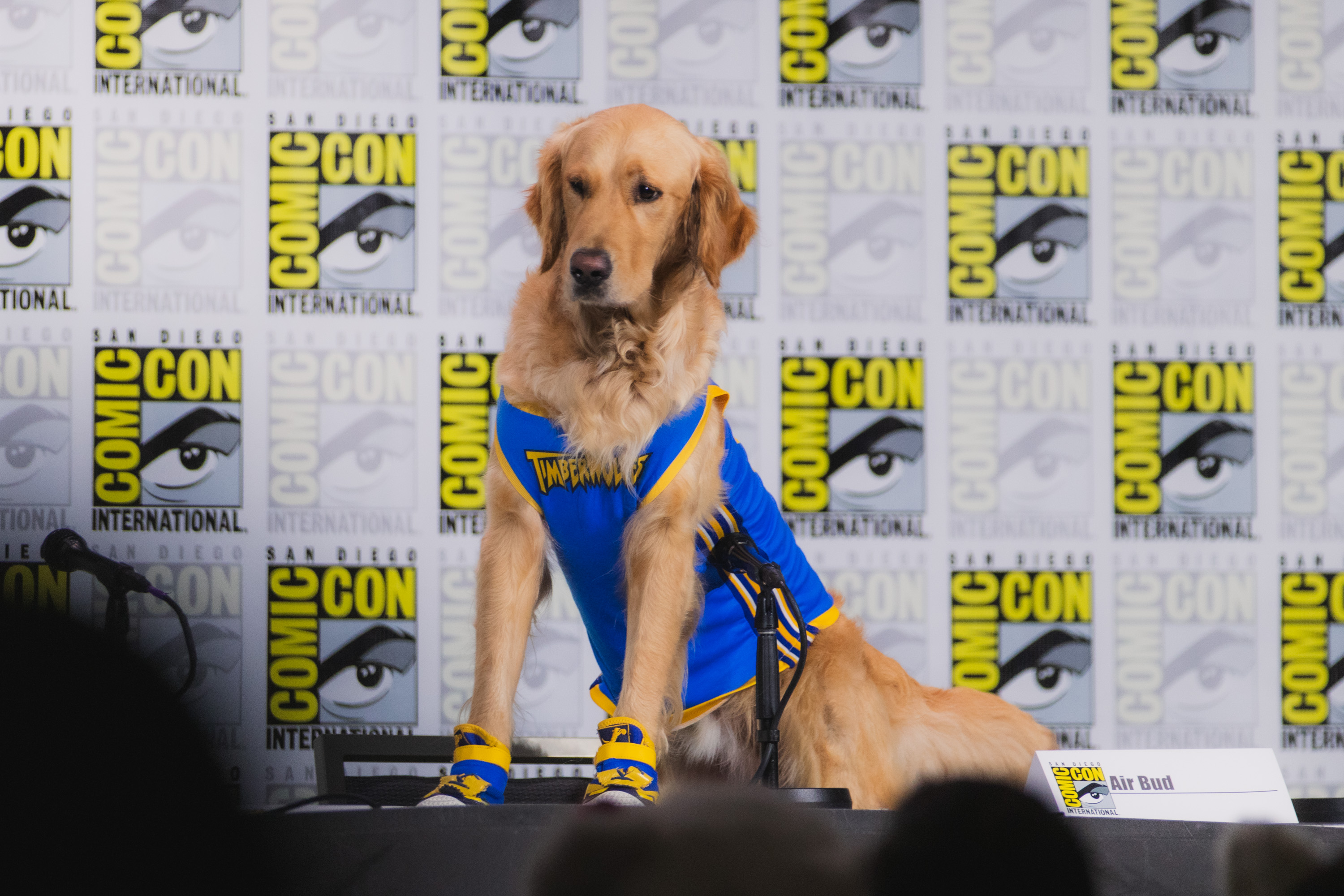
A dog promoting the film at San Diego Comic Con 2026

- Aydin Artis as Jacob, Buddy's new owner who is handicapped
- Tracy Ifeachor as Jasmine, Jacob's widowed mother
- Edwin Lee Gibson as Jack
- Tyler Labine as Walter
- Erik Gow as Marvin
- Maxim Swinton as Adam
- Charlie & Summer as Buddy

== Production ==
In July 2025, Cineverse announced that they were developing a new film in the Air Bud series, titled Air Bud Returns with Robert Vince writing, directing, and producing. Vince served as a producer on all of the previous Air Bud films. Golden Retrievers Charlie and Summer were selected from over 5,000 dogs to double as Buddy in basketball and stunt sequences. In October 2025, Aydin Artis, Tracy Ifeachor, Edwin Lee Gibson, Tyler Labine, Erik Gow, and Maxim Swinton joined the cast.

Principal photography began in Fort Langley, British Columbia on October 9, 2025. Production on Air Bud Returns has been announced to have wrapped on November 15, 2025.

== Release ==
Air Bud Returns is scheduled to be released in theatres in the United States by Cineverse on January 22, 2027, making it the first in the Air Bud franchise to be theatrically released since its sequel, Golden Receiver in 1998. It was originally scheduled to be released on August 21, 2026.
