= Spooky Buddies =

- DVD cover art
- Directed by: Robert Vince
- Written by: Anna McRoberts; Robert Vince
- Based on: Characters by Paul Tamasy; Aaron Mendelsohn; Kevin DiCicco; Robert Vince; Anna McRoberts
- Produced by: Anna McRoberts; Robert Vince
- Starring: Harland Williams; Rance Howard; Pat Finn; Jennifer Elise Cox; Skyler Gisondo^{2} Sierra McCormick; Sage Ryan; Elisa Donovan; Tucker Albrizzi; Jake Johnson; G. Hannelius; Ty Panitz; Nico Ghisi; Charles Henry Wyson; Diedrich Bader; Ryan Stiles; Tim Conway; Debra Jo Rupp; Frankie Jonas
- Cinematography: Mike Southon
- Edited by: Kelly Herron
- Music by: Brahm Wenger
- Production company: Key Pix Productions
- Distributed by: Walt Disney Studios Home Entertainment
- Release date: September 20, 2011
- Running time: 88 minutes
- Country: United States
- Language: English

Spooky Buddies is a 2011 American supernatural comedy film that is part of the Disney Buddies franchise, a series often referred to as the Air Bud and Air Buddies franchise. The fifth installment in the Air Buddies series, the plot follows the team as they have a Halloween adventure in Fernfield to stop the evil Warwick the Warlock and save the town. The film was directed by Robert Vince, produced by Anna McRoberts, and released by Walt Disney Studios Home Entertainment on Blu-ray, DVD, and as a film download on September 20, 2011.

== Plot ==
In 1937, Sheriff Jim and others from the town of Fernfield set off to the manor of Warwick the warlock, who has kidnapped five puppies to sacrifice them to the Halloween Hound. One of the puppies, Pip, belongs to a young boy named Joseph. As the mob prepares to storm the manor, the hound turns Pip's siblings to stone, but Pip escapes. Warwick chases him and grabs him as the mob enters. When the hound tries to kill Pip, he fails as the sun starts to hurt his eyes. Warwick escapes just as dawn approaches. Pip then turns to stone and becomes a ghost. Joseph takes Pip's stone body, while his father takes Warwick's spellbook. The Sheriff takes Warwick's staff and announces to the townspeople that he will board up Warwick's house to prevent anything else from happening.

75 years later, the Buddies are on a school trip to Warwick's manor with their owners, Alice, Billy, Pete, Sam and Bartleby. When the class go to the graveyard to see Deputy Tracker's memorial stone, Billy finds himself scared of the gravedigger Mr. Johnson. He hears the legend which says that if someone says "Halloween Hound" three times in front of Warwick's mirror, it will summon Halloween Hound. B-Dawg, who is a "scaredy cat", tries to prove he's not scared by entering the condemned manor and saying "Halloween Hound" three times in front of the mirror. The ghostly Pip tries to warn the Buddies, but B-Dawg becomes terrified of him and accidentally completes the reciting.

Two punks, Rodney and Skip, who had scared the class earlier on during the trip, witness the return of Warwick and the Halloween Hound, who step out of the mirror. Warwick, thinking that Rodney and Skip released them, turns them into rats after accusing them of stealing his staff. Warwick learns from his owl assistant, Hoot, that his staff is in the hands of Billy. Warwick immediately sets off to search for his staff and spell book. As he is searching the streets, he believes that the town is already taken over as everyone is dressed up for Halloween. He sends the Halloween Hound to find the Buddies, who ask for help from a sorceress dog named Zelda. It is here that Pip explains he is not trying to hurt them, but to warn them that the Halloween Hound is coming. After using a spell to return Pip to his body, the Hound finds them and turns Sniffer and Zelda to stone. The kids are then spotted by Warwick and hide in the Halloween party, where the warlock regains his staff. They are rescued by Mr. Johnson, Pip's owner.

Warwick takes the pups hostage in his manor and tells their owners that if the book is not returned, he will kill them. The Buddies have a daring escape from the Warlock. After escaping, they run from the Hound, who has turned Pip back to stone and opened the portal, releasing the evil spirits from the mirror. The spirits then take control over all the residents of Fernfield. Meanwhile, Hoot decides to stop by helping the Buddies and leave but is also turned to stone by the Hound. Following the groups' arrival to his manor, Warwick steals his book back and shoots his staff at Mr. Johnson.

As the Halloween Hound is about to suck out Budderball's soul, Budderball repels the magic with his farts, sucking out the Hound's soul. The kids and Mr. Johnson find Warwick paralyzed after opening his spellbook, which is revealed to have been switched with the Bible. Billy takes Warwick's staff and returns Warwick and the evil spirits to the mirror while changing the petrified and brainwashed victims back to normal. Mr. Johnson destroys the staff and the mirror to prevent Warwick from coming back.

Mr. Johnson is reunited with Pip as well while the kids are reunited with the Buddies. The kids bid goodbye to Johnson, who has located the owners of Pip's brothers and sisters and travels around America to return them. The Buddies bid farewell to Pip, who thanks them for helping him defeat Warwick.

== Cast ==
- Harland Williams as Warwick the Warlock
- Rance Howard as Mr. Joseph Johnson, Pip's owner
  - Max Charles as young Joseph
- Pat Finn as Mr. Carroll / Frankendude
- Jennifer Elise Cox as Mrs. Carroll
- Skyler Gisondo as Billy, B-Dawg's owner
- Sierra McCormick as Alice Finch, Rosebud's owner
- Sage Ryan as Pete Howard, Mudbud's owner
- Elisa Donovan as Janice, Billy's mother
- Tucker Albrizzi as Bartleby Livingstone, Budderball's owner
- Jake Johnson as Sam, Buddha's owner
- Michael Teigen as Deputy Dan
- Hardy Gatlin as Skip
- Dylan Sprayberry as Rodney

=== Voice cast ===
- Skyler Gisondo as B-Dawg
- G. Hannelius as Rosebud
- Ty Panitz as Mudbud
- Nico Ghisi as Budderball
- Charles Henry Wyson as Buddha
- Diedrich Bader as Halloween Hound, an English Mastiff
- Ryan Stiles as Hoot, a Eurasian eagle owl
- Tim Conway as Deputy Sniffer
- Debra Jo Rupp as Zelda, a Chinese Crested Dog
- Frankie Jonas as Pip, a Beagle puppy

== Release ==
=== Home media ===
Spooky Buddies was released on DVD, Blu-ray, and as a film download on September 20, 2011. The physical release was produced in two different packages: a 2-disc Blu-ray/DVD combo pack and a 1-disc DVD. The film download was produced in both standard and high definition. All versions of the release include an interview by Leo Howard of Disney Channel's Leo Little's Big Show with the character "Rosebud" and a music video for the song "Monster Mash".

== See also ==
- List of films set around Halloween
