= Air Bud: Spikes Back =

2003 film

- DVD cover art
- Directed by: Mike Southon
- Screenplay by: Anne Vince; Anna McRoberts
- Story by: Robert Vince
- Based on: Characters by Paul Tamasy; Aaron Mendelsohn; Kevin DiCicco
- Produced by: Anna McRoberts; Robert Vince; Benjamin Kutz
- Starring: Katija Pevec; Tyler Boissonnault; Edie McClurg; Patrick Cranshaw; Cynthia Stevenson; Jake D. Smith; Gabrielle Reece
- Cinematography: Mike Southon
- Edited by: Kelly Herron; Jason Pielak
- Music by: Brahm Wenger
- Production company: Keystone Family Pictures (Note: As Ruff Productions Inc.)
- Distributed by: Buena Vista Home Entertainment (Note: Under Walt Disney Home Entertainment imprint. Presented by Dimension Films.)
- Release date: June 24, 2003
- Running time: 87 minutes
- Countries: Canada; United States
- Language: English

Air Bud: Spikes Back (also known as Air Bud 5) is a 2003 sports comedy film directed by Mike Southon. It is the fifth and final film in the original Air Bud series. The film series itself was followed by a spin-off series: the Air Buddies franchise. It was the only Air Bud film not to include Kevin Zegers as Josh Framm. It was released on June 24, 2003 by Buena Vista Home Entertainment.

== Plot ==
Buddy finds that he also has the uncanny ability to play volleyball. Throughout this experience, he and a talking parrot stop some crooks, Doug and Gordon. Andrea Framm attempts to earn money to fly out to California to visit Tammy Slayton after her family must move there. Also, Andrea reveals that her older brother, Josh Framm, has decided to play football at college for the summer instead of returning home to Fernfield for summer vacation.

== Cast ==
- Katija Pevec as Andrea Framm, Buddy's owner
- Tyler Boissonnault as Connor, Andrea's love interest
- Edie McClurg as Gram Gram, Andrea and Noah's maternal grandmother and Polly's owner
- Patrick Cranshaw as Sheriff Bob
- Cynthia Stevenson as Jackie Framm-Sullivan, Andrea and Noah's widowed mother
- Jake D. Smith as Noah Sullivan, Andrea's younger maternal half-brother
- Gabrielle Reece as Herself
- Robert Tinkler as Doug, Gordon's partner
- Malcolm Scott as Gordon, Doug's partner
- Alf Humphreys as Dr. Patrick Sullivan, Andrea's stepfather and Noah’s father
- Chantal Strand as Tammy Slayton, Andrea's best friend
- C. Ernst Harth as Phil
- Ellen Kennedy as Wilma Slayton, Tammy's mother
- Nancy Robertson as Principal Pickle
- Doug Funk as Mailman Phil
- Brian Dobson as the voice of Polly the Parrot

== Release ==
Air Bud: Spikes Back was released directly to DVD on June 24, 2003, by Buena Vista Home Entertainment. It was reissued by Disney on June 16, 2008 in a double-pack alongside Air Bud: Seventh Inning Fetch.

Mill Creek Entertainment reissued the film on January 14, 2020, on a 2-disc box set, also containing other Air Bud films owned by Air Bud Entertainment.

All five Air Bud films, including Spikes Back, arrived on Disney+ on October 1, 2023.
