= Spymate =

- Directed by: Robert Vince
- Written by: Calvin Hansen
- Screenplay by: Anna McRoberts; Anne Vince; Robert Vince
- Story by: Anna McRoberts; Anne Vince
- Produced by: Anna McRoberts; Robert Vince
- Starring: Emma Roberts; Chris Potter; Richard Kind
- Cinematography: Mike Southon
- Music by: Brahm Wenger
- Production company: Keystone Family Pictures (Note: As Spy Chimp Productions Inc.)
- Distributed by: ThinkFilm; Les Films Séville
- Release date: February 24, 2006
- Running time: 84 minutes
- Country: Canada
- Language: English

Spymate is a 2006 Canadian adventure comedy film directed by Robert Vince, written by Calvin Hansen, and starring Emma Roberts and Chris Potter. It was released to Canadian theatres on February 24, 2006, and on DVD in North America on April 11, 2006. This was one of the last films featuring Pat Morita, and was released three months after his death.

== Plot ==
Minkey, a super-spy primate, rescues his partner Mike Muggins from Middle Eastern terrorists. Their secretary, Edith, commends them on being the two best spies in the business, but Mike informs her that he is going to retire to be with his wife and daughter. The movie flashes forward 10 years. Mike's wife had died, and his daughter, Amelia, is a child prodigy, having invented a revolutionary oxygen iodide laser drill. Amelia is about to receive the National Scientific Achievement Award from the world's leading scientists, Dr. Robert Farley and Dr. Claudette Amour. Mike tells her how proud he is, and reminds her that Minkey is in town, now the star of a circus show. Mike offers to take Amelia to Minkey's show, but Amelia laughs it off, remembering those "silly stories" he used to tell her about life as a spy.

As Amelia leaves for school, Hugo, a henchman, follows her and takes pictures of her. Amelia receives the National Scientific Achievement Award, although Dr. Amour is unable to be there. As she and Mike leave, Dr. Farley videotapes Mike with a pen-camcorder. The next day, Dr. Farley shows up in a black limousine and kidnaps Amelia, telling her that her father has a surprise for her. He has a manipulated video of Mike confirming this, and Amelia happily goes with Dr. Farley. Dr Farley takes her to Japan, explaining that it is a "top-secret government program." He has built a full-scale model of Amelia's drill, but it is not working properly; Amelia begins working on it. Meanwhile, Hugo delivers a package to Mike—it's a video of Dr. Farley, who promises not to hurt Amelia as long as Mike does not contact the authorities. Mike springs into action, contacting Edith and Minkey, persuading them to come out of retirement to help him save Amelia. Minkey's new friends from the circus are enlisted as spies; while Mike and Minkey fly to Jamaica to find Dr. Amour, Edith brings the performers up to speed on the project.

Apparently, Minkey was genetically enhanced and specially trained as a part of operation SPYMATE, but when the Russians moved in on the project, Mike was ordered to terminate Minkey. After Minkey exhibited formidable martial arts skills against KGB agents, Mike requested him as a partner. Meanwhile, Mike and Minkey find Dr. Amour, who tells them that Dr. Farley plans to use Amelia's drill to cut through the Earth's crust in a Japanese volcano and harness the heat energy of the Earth's core. However, according to Dr. Amour's calculation, the energy will cause a massive earthquake that could wipe Japan off the map. Dr. Amour agrees to take Mike and Minkey to Dr. Farley's drill site. Meanwhile, Amelia is becoming suspicious of Dr. Farley. She tries to escape, but is captured and held prisoner. Meanwhile, Mike, Minkey, and Dr. Amour parachute into the drill site.

Dr. Amour and Mike are captured, but Minkey escapes with the help of a Japanese ninja sensei, who "has been awaiting him." The sensei and his students tell Minkey how to breach Dr. Farley's lab and promise their help. Dr. Farley threatens to kill Mike and Dr. Amour if Amelia does not fix the drill. Amelia reluctantly tells him to put an elastic band around the drill to dampen the sympathetic resonance. Dr. Farley begins drilling into the earth and tells Hugo to kill Mike and Dr. Amour. As Mike and Dr. Amour are escorted out, Minkey ambushes Hugo. Mike fights off the other guards while Dr. Amour and Minkey run to the drill chamber. Dr. Amour distracts Dr. Farley while Mike and Minkey take out the guards in the drill chamber and rescue Amelia. More guards pour in, but Minkey's ninja friends drop out of the ceiling. Dr. Amour and Amelia stop the drill, but this causes it to explode. Mike, Minkey, Dr. Amour, and Amelia barely escape the exploding lab. Outside, Amelia exclaims to Mike that he really is a spy. Minkey receives a call from the president requesting his services in a "delicate matter" and snowboards away to more adventures. This would, however, be the last entry in the franchise, leaving Minkey's further adventures unclear and leaving the series on a cliffhanger.

== Cast ==
- Emma Roberts as Amelia Muggins
- Chris Potter as Mike Muggins
- Richard Kind as Dr. Robert Farley
- Michael Bailey Smith as Hugo
- Musetta Vander as Dr. Claudette Amour
- Debra Jo Rupp as Edith
- Louie as Minkey
- Pat Morita as Kiro Sensei
- Troy Yorke as Lightning
- Kathryn Kirkpatrick as Betty
- Guillaume Lemay-Thivierge as Fly
- Taras Kostyuk as Melmar
- Benjamin B. Smith as Little Boy
- Mark Acheson as Arab Terrorist
- Malcolm Scott as Ernest
- Peter Shinkoda as Mountain Guard
- Jay Brazeau as Ringmaster
- Barry Bostwick as the President of the United States

== Reception ==
Rotten Tomatoes reported a 17% approval rating with an average score of 3.08/10 based on 17 reviews.

Ron Yamauchi of The Georgia Straight said, "This is a serviceable enough plot... There's just enough gloss and location work to [the film] to make it a reasonable diversion for the wee. Older viewers might feel underwhelmed by the insufficiently violent explosions and vehicle stunts." Maria Llull of Common Sense Media gave the film a rating of two out of five stars, and described the film as, "both predictable and confusing at the same time." She also said, "Kids may like [the film], and though it's no cinematic feat, at least the violence isn't gratuitous."
