= Under Age =

Under Age may refer to:

- Under Age (1941 film), an American crime film directed by Edward Dmytryk
- Under Age (1964 film), an American drama film
