= 1998 Kids' Choice Awards =

Children's television awards show program broadcast in 1998

- Date: April 4, 1998
- Location: Pauley Pavilion
- Hosted by: Rosie O'Donnell

Television/radio coverage
- Network: Nickelodeon
- Viewership: 5.27 million
- Produced by: Marilyn Seabury
- Directed by: Glenn Weiss

The 11th Annual Nickelodeon Kids' Choice Awards was held on April 4, 1998, at Pauley Pavilion at UCLA in Los Angeles, California. Pop band Hanson won the most awards of the night, with wins for Favorite Group & Favorite Song. The ceremony is also notable for leading into "Dog Gone", the first episode of Nickelodeon's then newest Nicktoon, CatDog. This is the first show to take place at the Pauley Pavilion in California.

== Winners and nominees ==
Winners are listed first, in bold. Other nominees are in alphabetical order.

=== Movies ===
Favorite Movie	Favorite Movie Actor
**Titanic**; Batman & Robin; Liar Liar; Men in Black	**Will Smith** – Men in Black as James Darrell Edwards III / Agent J; Tim Allen – Jungle 2 Jungle as Michael Cromwell; Jim Carrey – Liar Liar as Fletcher Reede; Robin Williams – Flubber as Professor Philip Brainard
Favorite Movie Actress
**Alicia Silverstone** – Batman & Robin as Barbara Wilson / Batgirl; Beverly D'Angelo – Vegas Vacation as Ellen Griswold; Christina Ricci – That Darn Cat as Patti Randall; Uma Thurman – Batman & Robin as Dr. Pamela Isley / Poison Ivy

=== Television ===
Favorite TV Show	Favorite TV Actor
**Kenan & Kel**; Home Improvement; Sabrina the Teenage Witch; Sister, Sister	**Jonathan Taylor Thomas** – Home Improvement as Randy Taylor; Tim Allen – Home Improvement as Timothy "Tim" Taylor; Kenan Thompson & Kel Mitchell – Kenan & Kel as Kenan Rockmore & Kel Kimble; Marlon & Shawn Wayans – The Wayans Bros. as Marlon & Shawn Williams
Favorite TV Actress	Favorite Cartoon
**Melissa Joan Hart** – Sabrina the Teenage Witch as Sabrina Spellman; Kirstie Alley – Veronica's Closet as Veronica Chase; Brandy – Moesha as Moesha Mitchell; Tia & Tamera Mowry – Sister, Sister as Tia Landry & Tamera Campbell	**Rugrats**; Hey Arnold!; King of the Hill; The Simpsons

=== Music ===
Favorite Singer	Favorite Music Group
**Puff Daddy**; Mariah Carey; Celine Dion; Will Smith	**Hanson**; Backstreet Boys; No Doubt; Spice Girls
Favorite Song
**"MMMBop"** – Hanson; "Don't Speak" – No Doubt; "I'll Be Missing You" – Puff Daddy & Faith Evans feat. 112; "Men in Black" – Will Smith

=== Sports ===
Favorite Male Athlete	Favorite Female Athlete
**Michael Jordan**; Troy Aikman; Shaquille O'Neal; Tiger Woods	**Kristi Yamaguchi**; Dominique Dawes; Michelle Kwan; Lisa Leslie
Favorite Sports Team
**Chicago Bulls**; Atlanta Braves; Green Bay Packers; San Francisco 49ers

=== Miscellaneous ===
Favorite Video Game	Favorite Animal Star
**Super Mario 64**; Diddy's Kong-Quest; Super Mario World 2: Yoshi's Island; Star Fox 64	**Salem** – Sabrina the Teenage Witch; Buddy – Air Bud; Mouse – Mouse Hunt; Willy – Free Willy 3: The Rescue
Favorite Book
**Goosebumps: Deep Trouble II** – R. L. Stine; The Alien – K. A. Applegate; Falling Up – Shel Silverstein; The Giver – Lois Lowry

== Hall of Fame ==
- Tia Mowry
- Tamera Mowry
