= Air Bud: Seventh Inning Fetch =

- DVD cover art
- Directed by: Robert Vince
- Screenplay by: Sara Sutton; Stephanie Isherwood; Anne Vince; Anna McRoberts
- Story by: Robert Vince
- Based on: Characters by Paul Tamasy; Aaron Mendelsohn; Kevin DiCicco
- Produced by: Anna McRoberts; Robert Vince
- Starring: Caitlin Wachs; Cynthia Stevenson; Molly Hagan; Richard Karn; Kevin Zegers
- Cinematography: Steve Adelson
- Edited by: Kelly Herron; Jason Pielak
- Music by: Brahm Wenger; Eric Rohm
- Production company: Keystone Family Pictures (Note: As Fetch Boy Films Ltd.)
- Distributed by: Seville Pictures (Canada); Buena Vista Home Entertainment (Note: Under Walt Disney Home Entertainment imprint, presented by Dimension Films.) (United States and most territories)
- Release date: June 18, 2002
- Running time: 93 minutes
- Countries: Canada; United States
- Language: English

Air Bud: Seventh Inning Fetch (also known as Air Bud 4) is a 2002 sports comedy film directed by Robert Vince. It is the fourth film in the Air Bud series, the last to feature any cast members from the original film, and the first to be directed by Vince (in addition to his usual duties as a writer and producer). The film was released on June 18, 2002 by Seville Pictures in Canada and by Buena Vista Home Entertainment in the United States.

== Plot ==
Josh Framm is off to his first year of college and Buddy has stayed behind with Josh's little sister, Andrea, and the rest of the family. Jackie and Patrick have recently welcomed Josh and Andrea's baby half-brother Noah. Andrea, attempting to fit in with her junior high classmates, decides to join the baseball team. Buddy also has gained the uncanny ability to play baseball.

Just as the season is settling in, a terrible discovery is made — many local athletically talented dogs have mysteriously started disappearing with the help of the dognappers' little helper, Rocky Raccoon. It turns out the dognappers were researchers who were dognapping them because they thought they had a special gene that would enable them to play sports. Buddy must find them and make it to the major leagues as he goes to bat for the Anaheim Angels.

== Cast ==
- Caitlin Wachs as Andrea Framm, Josh's younger sister and Buddy's new owner
- Cynthia Stevenson as Jackie Framm Sullivan, Andrea and Josh's widowed mother
- Molly Hagan as Coach Crenshaw, the coach of Timberwolves
- Richard Karn as Dr. Patrick Sullivan, Josh and Andrea's stepfather
- Kevin Zegers as Josh Framm, Andrea's older brother and Buddy's former owner
- Patrick Cranshaw as Sheriff Bob
- Frank C. Turner as Carlton, Roger's assistant
- Jay Brazeau as Professor Roger Siles
- Shayn Solberg as Tom Stewart, Josh's best friend
- Chantal Strand as Tammy Slayton, Andrea's best friend
- Hannah and Emma Marof as Noah Sullivan, Andrea's younger maternal half-brother
- Doug Funk as Mailman Phil / Announcer
- Jim Hughson as Announcer
- Ellen Kennedy as Wilma Slayton, Tammy's mother
- Nick Harrison as Ump
- Shooter as Buddy
- Jeremy Mersereau as Dog-Hating Fan (uncredited)
- Jordy Cunningham as World Series Pitcher (uncredited)
- Todd Allan as World Series Catcher/Right Fielder (uncredited)

== Release ==
Air Bud: Seventh Inning Fetch was released directly to DVD and VHS on June 18, 2002 by Buena Vista Home Entertainment. It was reissued by Disney on DVD on June 16, 2008 in a double-pack alongside Air Bud: Spikes Back. Mill Creek Entertainment reissued the film on January 14, 2020 on a 2-disc boxset, also containing other Air Bud films owned by Air Bud Entertainment.

All five Air Bud films, including Seventh Inning Fetch, arrived on Disney+ on October 1, 2023.

== Reception ==
Common Sense Media praised the dogs as being "terrific", but complained that "the writing is weak, the plot is transparent, the characters are clichés, and the situations are ridiculous". Video Business said the film "is a lively outing filled with easily understood characters, colorful sets and costumes and a plot with very few complications". The Video Librarian said the film was "the runt of the litter" and was basically "ham-handed slapstick ... and all the bases are covered in this lightweight comedy, but in such formulaic fashion that we cannot recommend it". Film critic Scott Hettrick of The Los Angeles Times said the film "is a relatively weak installment, even within the confines of this lightweight live-action family series".

== See also ==
- Buddy
- List of baseball films
