= The Duke (1999 film) =

- Film poster
- Directed by: Philip Spink
- Screenplay by: Craig Detweiler; Anne Vince; Robert Vince
- Story by: Craig Detweiler
- Produced by: Ian Fodie
- Starring: John Neville; James Doohan; Courtnee Draper; Jeremy Maxwell; Oliver Muirhead
- Cinematography: Mike Southon
- Edited by: Kelly Herron
- Music by: Brahm Wenger
- Production company: Keystone Pictures (Note: As "The Duke" Gone Fishing Productions Inc.)
- Distributed by: Buena Vista Home Video
- Release date: 30 October 1999
- Running time: 88 minutes
- Country: Canada
- Language: English

The Duke is a 1999 Canadian comedy film. Its plot concerns a dog, Hubert, inheriting a Scottish country mansion.

== Plot ==
When the kind-hearted Duke of Dingwall dies, he leaves his estate and his dukedom to his Black and Tan Coonhound, Hubert, with Charlotte, the Butler's niece, as his guardian. Two greedy relatives, however, have it in for the dog, as they scheme to take over the manor.

== Cast ==
- John Neville as The Duke
- James Doohan as Clive Chives
- Courtnee Draper as Charlotte
- Jeremy Maxwell as Florian
- Oliver Muirhead as Cecil Cavendish
- Sophie Heyman as Shamela Stewart
- Judy Geeson as Lady Fautblossom
- Justine Johnston as Mrs. Puddingforth
- Lomax Study as Lord Huffbottom
- Paxton Whitehead as Basil Rathwood
- Frank C. Turner as Parsnip
- Carolyn Sadowska as The Queen
