= Watch It =

- Directed by: Tom Flynn
- Screenplay by: Tom Flynn
- Produced by: J. Christopher Burch; Thomas J. Mangan IV; John C. McGinley
- Starring: Peter Gallagher; Suzy Amis; John C. McGinley; Jon Tenney; Cynthia Stevenson; Lili Taylor; Tom Sizemore
- Cinematography: Stephen Katz
- Edited by: Dorian Harris
- Music by: Stanley Clarke
- Production companies: Island World; Manhattan Project; River One Films
- Distributed by: Skouras Pictures
- Release date: March 26, 1993
- Running time: 102 minutes
- Country: United States
- Language: English
- Budget: $3 million
- Box office: $120,623

Watch It is a 1993 American comedy film written and directed by Tom Flynn and starring Peter Gallagher, Suzy Amis, John C. McGinley, Jon Tenney, Cynthia Stevenson, Lili Taylor and Tom Sizemore.

== Plot ==
Perpetual man-child Mike (Jon Tenney) breaks up with his mature, pretty girlfriend, Anne (Suzy Amis), but doesn't have to dwell on it, thanks to Danny (Tom Sizemore) and Rick (John C. McGinley), both of whom share his immaturity and fear of emotional intimacy. Roommates in a Chicago house, they play an ongoing game called "Watch It!" involving pranks. But "Watch It!" stops being harmless fun when Mike's more soulful cousin, John (Peter Gallagher), moves in and takes an interest in Anne.

== Cast ==
- Peter Gallagher as John
- Suzy Amis as Anne
- John C. McGinley as Rick
- Jon Tenney as Michael
- Cynthia Stevenson as Ellen
- Lili Taylor as Brenda
- Tom Sizemore as Danny

== Reception ==
The film has a 56% rating on Rotten Tomatoes. Roger Ebert awarded the film two and a half stars. Owen Gleiberman of Entertainment Weekly graded the film a B+.
