= Hard Sell (film) =

2016 film by Sean Nalaboff

- Directed by: Sean Nalaboff
- Written by: Sean Nalaboff
- Produced by: Jimmy Seargeant; Sean Nalaboff; Jared Greenman
- Starring: Katrina Bowden; Skyler Gisondo; Kristin Chenoweth
- Cinematography: Danny Vecchione
- Edited by: Matthew Steinhart
- Music by: Clyde Lawrence; Cody Fitzgerald
- Production company: Yellow Cote Productions
- Distributed by: Momentum Pictures (Entertainment One)
- Release date: May 20, 2016

Hard Sell is an American comedy-drama written and directed by Sean Nalaboff in his directorial debut. The film stars Katrina Bowden, Skyler Gisondo, and Kristin Chenoweth, with Hannah Marks and Kevin Kilner in supporting roles.

== Plot ==
The story centers around Hardy Buchanan (Skyler Gisondo), a poor high school senior surrounded by affluence at an elite private school, located on Long Island's Gold Coast. Hardy struggles to support his unstable mom (Kristin Chenoweth) and her prized possession, Walter, the family dog. When Walter gets sick, Hardy has to come up with fast cash to pay for the surgery. Alone and having no one to turn to, Hardy sides with Bo (Katrina Bowden), an aimless socialite. Hardy and Bo team up and discover ways of profiting off of the wayward teens at school with deep pockets and even heavier issues. The unlikely duo's new business takes a unique turn when the students learn that Bo has more to offer than what meets the eye as the characters get tossed headfirst into the lifestyles of the rich and dysfunctional. Hardy fights to save Walter and fix his broken family while Bo's past comes back to haunt her. As things begin to spiral out of control, Hardy has to make a decision to rebuild his life or to walk away.

== Cast ==
- Katrina Bowden as Bo
- Skyler Gisondo as Hardy Buchanan
- Kristin Chenoweth as Lorna Buchanan, his mother
- Hannah Marks as Lake
- Jenna Leigh Green as Priscilla
- Kevin Kilner as Eddie
- Garrett Coffey as Jason

== Release ==
On February 22, 2016, Variety reported that film studio Momentum Pictures (Entertainment One) had acquired the domestic rights to the film and planned for a limited theatrical release in spring 2016. The film was released on May 30, 2016.
