= Agent Cody Banks =

2003 film directed by Harald Zwart

- Theatrical release poster
- Directed by: Harald Zwart
- Screenplay by: Scott Alexander Larry Karaszewski; Zack Stentz; Ashley Edward Miller
- Story by: Jeffrey Jurgensen
- Produced by: David C. Glasser; Andreas Klein; Dylan Sellers; Guy Oseary; David Nicksay
- Starring: Frankie Muniz; Hilary Duff; Angie Harmon; Keith David; Cynthia Stevenson; Arnold Vosloo; Ian McShane
- Cinematography: Denis Crossan
- Edited by: Jim Miller
- Music by: John Powell
- Production companies: Splendid Pictures; Maverick Films; Dylan Sellers Productions
- Distributed by: MGM Distribution Co. (U.S. & Canada); 20th Century Fox (International)
- Release date: March 14, 2003
- Running time: 102 minutes
- Country: United States
- Language: English
- Budget: $28 million
- Box office: $58.8 million

Agent Cody Banks is a 2003 American spy action-comedy film directed by Harald Zwart. The film stars Frankie Muniz as Cody Banks, a 15-year-old who goes undercover for the CIA as a James Bond–type superspy. Hilary Duff, Angie Harmon, Keith David, Cynthia Stevenson, Arnold Vosloo and Ian McShane appear in supporting roles.

The film's executive producers include Madonna, whose then-production company Maverick Films acquired the script, and Jason Alexander, who was originally attached to direct before being replaced by Vic Armstrong, who was ultimately replaced by Zwart. It was filmed in Vancouver, British Columbia.

Agent Cody Banks was released in the United States on March 14, 2003 by MGM, and received mixed reviews from critics. A sequel, Agent Cody Banks 2: Destination London, was released in 2004.

== Plot ==
Cody Banks, a 15-year-old high school sophomore, applies for a junior field ops position at the Central Intelligence Agency's Special Activities Division after completing a training summer camp. Answering to his handler Ronica Miles, Cody is called upon a mission to find information about a scientist named Dr. Albert Connors. Connors is employed by a SPECTRE-type organization named ERIS led by Dr. Brinkman and his henchman François Molay. As all CIA agents are known to Brinkman's organization, the CIA uses the unknown Banks, who is placed into the prep school of Dr. Connors' daughter Natalie, the William Donovan Institute.

Cody soon finds he has no social skills with girls and has no time to do this while balancing his chores and homework. The CIA decides to help by doing his chores and homework, trying to build his status, and going into the school to set him up with Natalie. The CIA also assemble a varying team of "experts" to train Cody into how to talk to girls, and issue him with a variety of gadgets with various functions.

Eventually, Cody befriends and falls in love with Natalie after rescuing her from falling off a ladder while putting up a banner, and he is invited to her 16th birthday party, where he goes undercover to her father's lab. Cody finds that Brinkman plans to use nanobots — which can destroy any carbon or silicon-based substance — to destroy the world's defense systems so he can threaten anyone who opposes him. Since the nanobots are inactive in the cold, he plans to use ice cubes to distribute them. After Connors, Brinkman, and François leave the lab, Cody tries taking one of the ice cubes, but melts when in his possession.

After Cody fights some delinquents at the party, the CIA suspends him from the mission. Meanwhile, with Connors refusing to aid him in his plans, Brinkman has François and his henchmen bring Natalie into his base in the Cascade Mountains. Meanwhile, Cody, disobeying orders to avoid Natalie, eats ice cream at a local restaurant with her. Cody attempts to explain things to Natalie but François and a group of henchmen ambush Cody and abduct Natalie.

With Cody removed from the mission, he gives his younger brother Alex the $5,000 from the CIA in exchange for keeping his disappearance a secret. Knowing Natalie's location via a tracking device in a necklace he gave her as a birthday present, Cody travels to the mountains using a rocket powered snowboard and other devices. After being discovered by Ronica, Cody persuades her to help him rescue Natalie. The pair infiltrate the laboratory and Cody rescues Natalie, also explaining the truth about why he went out with her.

However, Brinkman holds Natalie hostage and puts an ice cube with a nanobot inside on her forehead to make her father program the system. Cody activates a series of explosive charges he and Ronica planted throughout the base, and in the ensuing battle, Ronica fights off several of Brinkman's men, and Natalie places the ice cube with the nanobots into his mouth, causing the nanobots to devour him from the inside out. Cody later defeats François and sends him to the CIA using the SoloTrek XFV, before fleeing the exploding facility with Ronica, Natalie and Dr. Connors. The CIA welcomes Cody back to the team and congratulates him for completing the mission, and Cody is given a reward to give Natalie her driver's license. After driving at the beach, Cody and Natalie share a kiss, starting a relationship.

== Cast ==
- Frankie Muniz as Cody Banks
- Hilary Duff as Natalie Connors
- Angie Harmon as Ronica Miles
- Keith David as the CIA Director
- Ian McShane as Dr. Brinkman
- Arnold Vosloo as François Molay
- Cynthia Stevenson as Mrs. Banks
- Daniel Roebuck as Mr. Banks
- Connor Widdows as Alex Banks
- Martin Donovan as Dr. Connors
- Darrell Hammond as Earl
- Noel Fisher as Fenster
- Andrew Francis as Fenster's buddy

== Production ==
For his participation, Muniz was paid $2 million, the highest amount paid to a child actor at that point since Macaulay Culkin. Agent Cody Banks was developed as part of a broader strategy by MGM to make less-expensive films that can appeal to younger and niche audiences. Both Muniz and Angie Harmon did most of their own stunts. The film used Media.net’s Edit System Dailies to transfer pre-digitized Avid system files from the post production facility Rainmaker in Vancouver directly to the pic’s editing rooms in Los Angeles without having to wait for tapes to be delivered, allowing producers and executives to receive their viewing copies half a day sooner than through the traditional method. Principal photography took place in 2002 in Vancouver, British Columbia.

In 2025, Muniz revealed that Duff was not his first choice for her role and that he had wanted Kristin Kreuk. Muniz and Duff's mother didn't get along, which soured the friendship between Muniz and Duff; they never spoke again after the release of the film.

== Reception ==
On review aggregator Rotten Tomatoes, Agent Cody Banks holds a 38% approval rating and an average rating of 5.2/10 based on 102 reviews. The critics consensus states, "Should satisfy young teens, but offers nothing new for those who are familiar with the formula." On Metacritic, it has a score of 41 out of 100 based on reviews from 24 critics, indicating "mixed or average" reviews. Audiences polled by CinemaScore gave the film an average grade of "A-" on an A+ to F scale. Roger Ebert gave the film 2.5 out of 4 stars. He said that kids would probably enjoy it, but, unlike the Spy Kids series, adults would probably not.

Agent Cody Banks opened at No. 2 with $14 million behind Bringing Down the House's second weekend. By the time the film closed on July 31, 2003, it earned $48 million in the US and an additional $10.9 million internationally, adding up to a total $58.8 million.

Frankie Muniz's character is asked twice if he is "in special ed". When the film was released on home video, MGM included an apologetic paragraph in response to criticism regarding these lines.

Regarding the references to special ed in the movie, we in no way meant to be insensitive to kids with special educational needs. Rather, it was meant to show how cruel kids can be to one another. As you have seen, Cody overcomes his own speech problems and saves the day. Thank you to those who brought this to our attention. We will be mindful of it in the sequel.

== Sequel ==
Muniz reprised his title role in the sequel, subtitled Destination London, which was released on March 12, 2004. Duff and Angie Harmon were replaced by different characters played by Anthony Anderson and Hannah Spearritt.
