= Air Bud =

1997 sports film by Charles Martin Smith

- American theatrical release poster
- Directed by: Charles Martin Smith
- Written by: Paul Tamasy; Aaron Mendelsohn
- Based on: The character by Kevin DiCicco
- Produced by: Robert Vince; William Vince
- Starring: Michael Jeter; Kevin Zegers; Wendy Makkena; Eric Christmas; Brendan Fletcher; Norman Browning; Bill Cobbs; Buddy
- Cinematography: Mike Southon
- Edited by: Alison Grace
- Music by: Brahm Wenger
- Production company: Keystone Pictures (Note: As Buddy Films Inc.)
- Distributed by: Buena Vista Pictures Distribution (Note: Released by Buena Vista Pictures Distribution through the Walt Disney Pictures banner.) (United States); Malofilm Distribution (Canada)
- Release date: August 1, 1997
- Running time: 98 minutes
- Countries: United States; Canada; Luxembourg
- Language: English
- Budget: $3 million
- Box office: $29 million

Air Bud is a 1997 sports comedy-drama film directed by Charles Martin Smith and written by Paul Tamasy and Aaron Mendelsohn. Based on the character of the same name created by Kevin DiCicco, the film stars Michael Jeter, Kevin Zegers, Wendy Makkena, Eric Christmas, Brendan Fletcher, Norman Browning, Bill Cobbs, and dog actor Buddy as the title character. The plot follows a young boy who befriends a runaway Golden Retriever with a unique ability to play basketball.

Air Bud was released on August 1, 1997, by Buena Vista Pictures Distribution through the Walt Disney Pictures banner in the United States, and by Malofilm Distribution in Canada. The film received mixed reviews but was a commercial success, grossing $29 million against a $3 million budget. A sequel, Air Bud: Golden Receiver, was released in 1998, and spawned a film franchise that includes the spin-off series Air Buddies.

== Plot ==
After the death of his father, twelve-year-old Josh Framm, his mother Jackie, and his two-year-old sister Andrea have relocated to Fernfield, Washington. One day after school, Josh practices basketball by himself in a makeshift court that he sets up behind an abandoned church, where he meets a runaway Golden Retriever who had recently escaped from his abusive owner: an alcoholic clown named Norman Snively. Discovering his uncanny ability to play basketball, Josh names him Buddy and takes him home. Jackie agrees to let Buddy stay until Christmas. Once the holidays arrive, Jackie allows Josh to keep Buddy as a Christmas present.

At school, Josh earns the disdain of star basketball player and team rival Larry Willingham, but befriends kindhearted maintenance engineer and retired pro player Arthur Chaney. With Chaney's encouragement, Josh earns a place on the Timberwolves, the school basketball team, despite the reservations of their competitive coach, Joe Barker. He befriends teammate Tom Stewart at his first game. Buddy escapes and shows up at school during the game. The audience loves him when he scores a basket.

Barker is fired after being caught emotionally and physically abusing Tom for his poor performance. At Josh's suggestion, he is replaced by Chaney. When Larry is subbed out due to ball-hogging and unsportsman-like conduct, his father forces him to leave the team and join their rival. Buddy becomes the mascot of the school's basketball team and appears in their halftime shows. The Timberwolves lose one game before qualifying for the State Finals.

Just before the championship game, Snively appears after seeing Buddy on television. Hoping to profit from Buddy's newfound fame, he forces Jackie to hand over Buddy as he has papers proving he is the legal owner. Withdrawn and depressed, Josh discovers Snively living in a small, low-income house and sneaks into his backyard, freeing Buddy from his chain. Snively notices him and pursues them in his dilapidated pickup truck through a park before crashing into a lake. Josh protects Buddy by setting him free in the forest to find a new life.

The Timberwolves struggle in the championship game, and an injury leaves them with four players. Buddy shows up to the crowd's cheers. After it is discovered that there is no rule preventing a dog from playing basketball, he is added to the roster and leads the team to victory.

Despite his ownership papers being ruined in the truck wreck, Snively takes the Framm family to court for custody of Buddy. Chaney suggests that Buddy choose his owner. Judge Cranfield accepts his proposal and moves the court outside to the lawn, where Buddy attacks Snively and chooses Josh. Cranfield grants custody to Josh. As a ranting Snively, who tries to get the dog back, is dragged away by the police when Cranfield orders his arrest, Josh and the rest of the citizens gather around Buddy to welcome him home.

== Cast ==
- Michael Jeter as Norm, the alcoholic birthday party clown and Buddy's abusive owner
- Kevin Zegers as Josh Framm, Buddy's new owner
- Wendy Makkena as Jackie Framm, Josh's widowed mother
- Eric Christmas as Judge Cranfield, the court judge of Fernfield County Courthouse
- Bill Cobbs as Arthur Chaney, the new coach of the Fernfield Timberwolves
- Brendan Fletcher as Larry Willingham, Josh's rival
- Norman Browning as Buck Willingham, Larry's father and the coach of the Spokane Warriors
- Nicola Cavendish as Principal Pepper, the principal of Fernfield Junior School
- Stephen E. Miller as Joe Barker, the abusive coach of the Fernfield Timberwolves and coach of Larry
- Shayn Solberg as Tom Stewart, Josh's best friend
- Jay Brazeau as Referee
- Buddy as Buddy / Air-Bud

== Production ==
Air Bud was inspired by Kevin DiCicco's Golden Retriever Buddy, who had been featured on America's Funniest Home Videos and David Letterman's "Stupid Pet Tricks". In 1991, DiCicco approached the independent production company Keystone Entertainment to produce Air Bud, a film based on Buddy. He also formed his production company, Air Bud Productions, that year. Reportedly, DiCicco didn't like the title Air Bud and had wanted to call the film Buddy. However, a film with that title had been released two months prior, so it was changed.

US distribution rights were initially acquired by Miramax Films, but was instead moved as a Walt Disney Pictures release.

== Home media ==
Air Bud was released to VHS on December 23, 1997, and to DVD on February 3, 1998 (with an open matte aspect ratio).

Mill Creek Entertainment released the film in a two-disc boxed set also containing other Air Bud films owned by Air Bud Entertainment on January 14, 2020.

All five Air Bud films were made available on Disney+ on October 1, 2023.

== Reception ==
=== Box office ===
The film grossed $4.7 million on its opening weekend, placing #7 for that weekend.

=== Critical response ===
On the review aggregator website Rotten Tomatoes, 48% of 31 critics' reviews are positive, with an average rating of 4.8/10. The website's consensus reads: "Air Bud's wacky concept isn't entirely enough to fill a feature-length film, but this rather silly family-friendly outing is partly redeemed by its extremely charming title character."

Audiences polled by CinemaScore gave the film an average grade of "A" on an A+ to F scale.

== See also ==
- List of basketball films
