= Will You Merry Me? =

2008 television film

- Written by: Karen McClellan
- Directed by: Nisha Kumari
- Starring: Wendie Malick; Cynthia Stevenson
- Composer: David Buchbinder
- Country of origin: United States
- Original language: English

Production
- Executive producer: Fernando Szew
- Producers: Marc B. Lorber; Mary Pantelidis
- Cinematography: Yuri Yakubiw
- Editor: Michael Munn
- Running time: 89 minutes

Original release
- Network: Lifetime
- Release: December 13, 2008

Will You Merry Me? is a television comedy Christmas film starring Wendie Malick and Cynthia Stevenson. It was filmed in 2007/2008, and was first aired on Lifetime in 2008.

== Plot ==
The Fines must survive Christmas with the Kringles. Rebecca, Jewish, and her fiancé Henry, Christian, must get to know their in-laws, put up with fighting parents, and survey their family's traditions as they prepare to share a life together.

== Cast ==
- Wendie Malick as Suzie Fine
- Cynthia Stevenson as Marilyn Kringle
- Vikki Krinsky as Rebecca Fine
- Tommy Lioutas as Henry Kringle
- David Eisner as Marvin Fine
- Patrick McKenna as Hank Kringle
- Reagan Pasternak as Kristy Easterbrook
- Martin Doyle as Tom Schultz

== See also ==
- List of Christmas films
