= Skyler Gisondo =

American actor (born 1996)

- Gisondo in 2026
- Born: Skyler Augustus Gisondo; July 22, 1996 (age 30); Palm Beach County, Florida, U.S.
- Occupation: Actor
- Years active: 2003–present

Skyler Augustus Gisondo (/dʒɪˈsɒndoʊ/ jiss-ON-doh; born July 22, 1996) is an American actor. He is known for his roles in the films Vacation (2015), Booksmart (2019), Licorice Pizza (2021), Superman (2025), and Primetime (2026), as well as the television series Psych (2010–2012), Santa Clarita Diet (2017–2019), and The Righteous Gemstones (2019–2025).

== Early life and education ==
Gisondo was born on July 22, 1996, in Palm Beach County, Florida. His parents, Stacey (née Berke) and Ron, are ocean engineers. His last name comes from his paternal grandfather, who was Italian-American. His other three grandparents were Jewish. Gisondo grew up in Florida, and later moved to South Bay, Los Angeles. After he began working frequently, he was homeschooled for several years. He attended Milken Community High School in Los Angeles, graduating in 2014. In 2015, he began attending the University of Southern California's film school, at first full-time and later part-time, before taking a hiatus to film Santa Clarita Diet.

== Career ==
=== 2000s ===
Gisondo began acting on television at the age of six. In Southern California, his mother sent photos of him to talent agencies. This led to a successful audition for a national Pizza Hut commercial. In 2003, Gisondo made his first appearance on television, playing Jeffrey in the comedy-drama series Miss Match in the episode "Forgive and Forget". In 2006, Gisondo made his feature film debut in the drama film by Craig E. Serling's Jam portraying Robert. Gisondo was cast in the voice role of B-Dawg in the sports comedy film Air Buddies.

From 2007 to 2009, Gisondo was cast to play a main role in the sitcom The Bill Engvall Show opposite Bill Engvall, Nancy Travis, Jennifer Lawrence and Graham Patrick Martin, he won the Outstanding Young Performers in a TV Series at the 30th Young Artist Awards. In 2007, Gisondo took on a supporting role in the slasher film Halloween, which is a remake of John Carpenter's 1978 film of the same name and the ninth installment in the Halloween franchise, which was released on August 31, 2007. In the same year, he appeared as Dewford "Dewdrop/Dewey" Cox, Jr. in the comedy film Walk Hard: The Dewey Cox Story, which was released on December 21, 2007.

In 2008, Gisondo reprised the voice role of B-Dawg in Snow Buddies, the second installment in the Air Buddies series. That same year, he appeared as Connor McVie in the Christmas comedy film Four Christmases, released by Warner Bros. Pictures on November 26, 2008. In 2009, Gisondo reprised his role in the third and fourth installments of the Air Buddies franchise, Space Buddies and Santa Buddies.

=== 2010s ===
In early 2010, Gisondo had a recurring role in the detective comedy-drama series Psych portraying a young version of James Roday's character Shawn Spencer, replacing Liam James. In 2011, Gisondo acted as Billy and voiced B-Dawg in the supernatural comedy film Spooky Buddies, the fifth installment in the Air Buddies series, winning the Best Performance in a DVD Film - Young Ensemble Cast shared with Tucker Albrizzi, Sierra McCormick, Jake Johnson and Sage Ryan at the 33rd Young Artist Awards.

In 2012, Gisondo had a voice role in the comedy film Treasure Buddies, the sixth installment in the Air Buddies franchise. The same year, he played the young version of Chris Diamantopoulos' character Moe Howard in the comedy movie The Three Stooges directed by Peter Farrelly and Bobby Farrelly. Gisondo played the role of Howard Stacy in the 2012 American superhero film by Marc Webb titled The Amazing Spider-Man. In 2014, he reprised his role in the film's sequel The Amazing Spider-Man 2 starring Andrew Garfield, Emma Stone and Jamie Foxx. Gisondo was cast in the 2014 fantasy comedy film by Shawn Levy's titled Night at the Museum: Secret of the Tomb starring Ben Stiller, Robin Williams, Owen Wilson, Rami Malek, Dan Stevens and Ben Kingsley, in which he played the role of Nicholas "Nick" Daley. His character was played by Jake Cherry in the previous films.

In 2015, Gisondo starred in the road comedy movie Vacation opposite Ed Helms, Christina Applegate and Steele Stebbins, which was released on July 29. In 2016, Gisondo starred along with Katrina Bowden and Kristin Chenoweth in the comedy-drama movie Hard Sell written and directed by Sean Nalaboff, which was released on May 20.

In 2017, Gisondo starred alongside Olivia Holt, Kristin Chenoweth, Kathleen Chalfant, Nick Krause, and Peter Maloney in the romantic comedy film Class Rank as Bernard Flannigan, which premiered at the Newport Beach Film Festival on April 21 and had a limited release by Cinedigm on May 11, 2018. In the same year, he appeared in the satirical comedy miniseries Wet Hot American Summer: Ten Years Later.

From 2017 to 2019, Gisondo was cast to play a main role in the comedy horror series Santa Clarita Diet opposite Drew Barrymore, Timothy Olyphant and Liv Hewson, in which he played the role of Eric Bemis. In 2018, Gisondo co-starred opposite Asa Butterfield and Sophie Turner in the sci-fi comedy drama movie Time Freak, which was released in limited release and on digital on November 9. He starred with Madison Iseman in the comedy movie Feast of the Seven Fishes, which premiered on November 1, 2018 in Fairmont, West Virginia and was released on November 15, 2019.

In 2019, Gisondo was cast as Gideon Gemstone in the comedy crime series The Righteous Gemstones. That same year, he appeared in Olivia Wilde's Booksmart starring Beanie Feldstein and Kaitlyn Dever, playing Jared. He starred opposite Alex Wolff, Mike Epps, Tommy Nelson and Stefania LaVie Owen in the coming-of-age drama film The Cat and the Moon portraying Seamus.

=== 2020s ===
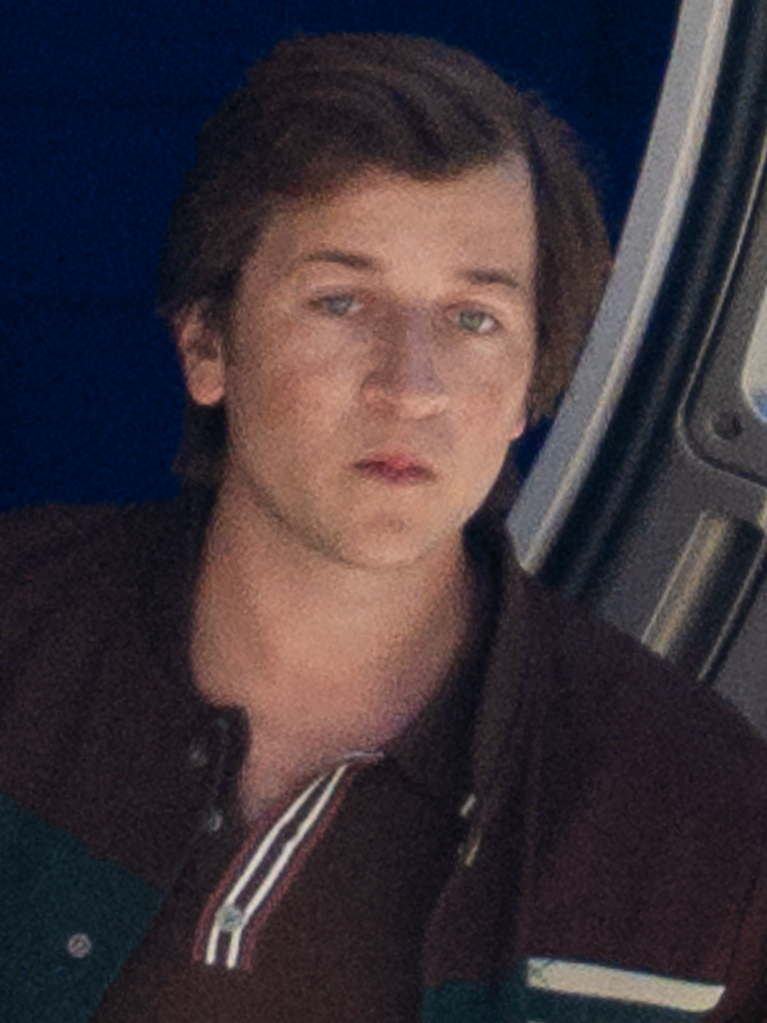
Gisondo as Jimmy Olsen on the set of Superman in 2024

In early 2020, Gisondo appeared in the docudrama film The Social Dilemma as Ben. He starred alongside Eduardo Franco and Dexter Darden as Griffin in the parody film The Binge, which was released on August 28, 2020. In 2021, he appeared in the fantasy comedy-drama film The Starling, portraying Dickie. In the same year, he appeared in the comedy-drama film Licorice Pizza as Lance Brannigan.

From 2021 to 2022, Gisondo starred alongside Kiersey Clemons, Peter S. Kim and Jaboukie Young-White in the adult animated comedy series Fairfax, in which he played the lead role as Dale. In 2022, Gisondo was cast in the dark comedy mystery series The Resort starring William Jackson Harper and Cristin Milioti, in the role of Sam Knowlston.

In July 2025, Gisondo appeared as Jimmy Olsen in Superman (2025) with David Corenswet, Rachel Brosnahan, Nicholas Hoult, Anthony Carrigan and Edi Gathegi. He will also appear in the sequel Man of Tomorrow and the spin-off TV series The People v. Gorilla Grodd, both of which are set to release in 2027.

Gisondo is set to portray Henry Focker in the upcoming film Focker-in-Law, alongside Robert De Niro, Ben Stiller, Owen Wilson, Ariana Grande, Blythe Danner and Teri Polo, and replacing Colin Baiocchi, who played the same character in the prior film. Gisondo has been announced to voice Farkle in the 2027 film Shrek 5, with Mike Myers, Eddie Murphy, Cameron Diaz and Zendaya.

== Personal life ==
Gisondo is a resident of Manhattan Beach, California.

While filming Night at the Museum: Secret of the Tomb in Vancouver, Gisondo asked Ben Stiller and Robin Williams to help him film a "promposal" formally asking his girlfriend to senior prom. They filmed a three-minute comedy routine with Crystal the Monkey.

== Filmography ==
=== Film ===
Year	Title	Role	Notes
2006	Jam	Robert	
2006	Air Buddies	B-Dawg (voice)	
2007	Halloween	Tommy Doyle	
2007	Walk Hard: The Dewey Cox Story	Dewdrop	
2008	Snow Buddies	B-Dawg (voice)	
2008	Four Christmases	Connor McVie	
2009	Space Buddies	B-Dawg (voice)	
2009	Santa Buddies	B-Dawg (voice)	
2011	Spooky Buddies	B-Dawg (voice) and Billy (live action)	
2012	Treasure Buddies	B-Dawg (voice)	
2012	The Three Stooges	Young Moe	
2012	The Amazing Spider-Man	Howard Stacy	
2014	The Amazing Spider-Man 2	Howard Stacy	
2014	Night at the Museum: Secret of the Tomb	Nicholas "Nick" Daley	Replacing Jake Cherry from the first two films
2015	Vacation	James Griswold	
2016	Hard Sell	Hardy Buchanan	
2017	Class Rank	Bernard Flannigan	
2018	Time Freak	Evan	
2019	Booksmart	Jared	
2019	The Cat and the Moon	Seamus	
2019	Feast of the Seven Fishes	Tony	
2020	The Binge	Griffin	
2020	The Social Dilemma	Ben	
2021	The Starling	Dickie	
2021	Licorice Pizza	Lance Brannigan	
2025	Superman	Jimmy Olsen	
2026	Primetime	Dan Plum	
2026	Focker-in-Law †	Henry Focker	Post-production
2027	Shrek 5 †	Farkle (voice)	In production
2027	Man of Tomorrow †	Jimmy Olsen	Post-production

=== Television ===
Year	Title	Role	Notes
2003	Miss Match	Jeffrey	Episode: "Forgive and Forget"
2005	Huff	Jackson Coleman	Episode: "Christmas Is Ruined"
2005	Everybody Loves Raymond	Chris	Episode: "The Faux Pas"
2005	What I Like About You	Ryan	Episode: "The Kid, the Cake, and the Chemistry"
2005	Monk	Kyle	Episode: "Mr. Monk Stays in Bed"
2005	Cold Case	Ned Burton (1972)	Episode: "Honor"
2005	Strong Medicine	Tommy Nauls	Episode: "We Wish You a Merry Cryst-Meth"
2006	Criminal Minds	Boy #1	Episode: "What Fresh Hell?"
2006	House	Clancy Green	Episode: "Cane and Able"
2006	ER	Timmy Jankowski	Episodes: "Twenty-One Guns" and "Bloodline"
2006	Drake & Josh	Tyler	Episode: "I Love Sushi"
2007	CSI: Crime Scene Investigation	Danny Curtis	Episode: "Leaving Las Vegas"
2007–2009	The Bill Engvall Show	Bryan Pearson	Main role; 31 episodes
2008	Terminator: The Sarah Connor Chronicles	Young Kyle Reese	Episode: "What He Beheld"
2008	My Name Is Earl	Gerald	Episode: "I Won't Die with a Little Help from My Friends: Part 2"
2008–2009	American Dad!	TV Announcer / Matty Moyer (voices)	2 episodes
2009	CSI: NY	Jake Kaplan	Episode: "The Party's Over"
2009–2010	Eastwick	Gene Friesen	2 episodes
2010–2012	Psych	Young Shawn	Recurring cast; 10 episodes
2013	Once Upon a Time	Devin	Episode: "Good Form"
2017	Wet Hot American Summer: Ten Years Later	Jeremy "Deegs" Deegenstein	3 episodes
2017–2019	Santa Clarita Diet	Eric Bemis	Main role
2018	The Real Bros of Simi Valley	Tyler	Episode: "Obnoxiously Depressed"
2019–2025	The Righteous Gemstones	Gideon Gemstone	Main role
2020	Curb Your Enthusiasm	Sam Winokur	Episode: "The Ugly Section"
2020	Close Enough	Cameron (voice)	Episode: "So Long Boys"
2021–2022	Fairfax	Dale (voice)	Main role
2022	The Resort	Sam Knowlston	Main role
2023	Solar Opposites	Zylenol (voice)	Episode: "Down and Out on Planet X-Non"
2023	Scavengers Reign	Charlie	Episode: "The Demeter"
2024–2025	Jurassic World: Chaos Theory	Earnest (voice)	6 episodes
2025–present	Haunted Hotel	Ben (voice)	Main role
2026	Brothers	Jimmy	Episode: "Valentine's Day"
TBA	The People v. Gorilla Grodd †	Jimmy Olsen	Main role; filming

=== Music videos ===
Year	Song	Artist
2026	"Lost Boys"	Phoebe Bridgers

=== Video games ===
Year	Title	Role	Notes
2022	The Quarry	Max Brinly	Voice, motion capture and likeness

== Awards and nominations ==
Year	Award	Category	Work	Result	Ref.
2007	Young Artist Award	Best Performance in a TV Series (Comedy or Drama) - Guest Starring Young Actor	House	Nominated	
2009	Young Artist Award	Best Performance in a TV Series (Comedy or Drama) - Supporting Young Actor	The Bill Engvall Show	Nominated	
2009	Young Artist Award	Outstanding Young Performers in a TV Series (with Graham Patrick Martin and Jennifer Lawrence)	The Bill Engvall Show	Won	
2010	Young Artist Award	Best Performance in a TV Series (Comedy or Drama) - Supporting Young Actor	The Bill Engvall Show	Nominated	
2012	Young Artist Award	Best Performance in a DVD Film - Young Ensemble Cast	Spooky Buddies	Won	
2016	Young Entertainer Awards	Best Young Ensemble Cast - Feature Film	Vacation	Nominated	
2026	Gotham Awards	Outstanding Supporting Performance	Primetime	Pending	
