= Robert Vince =

Canadian film director (born 1962)

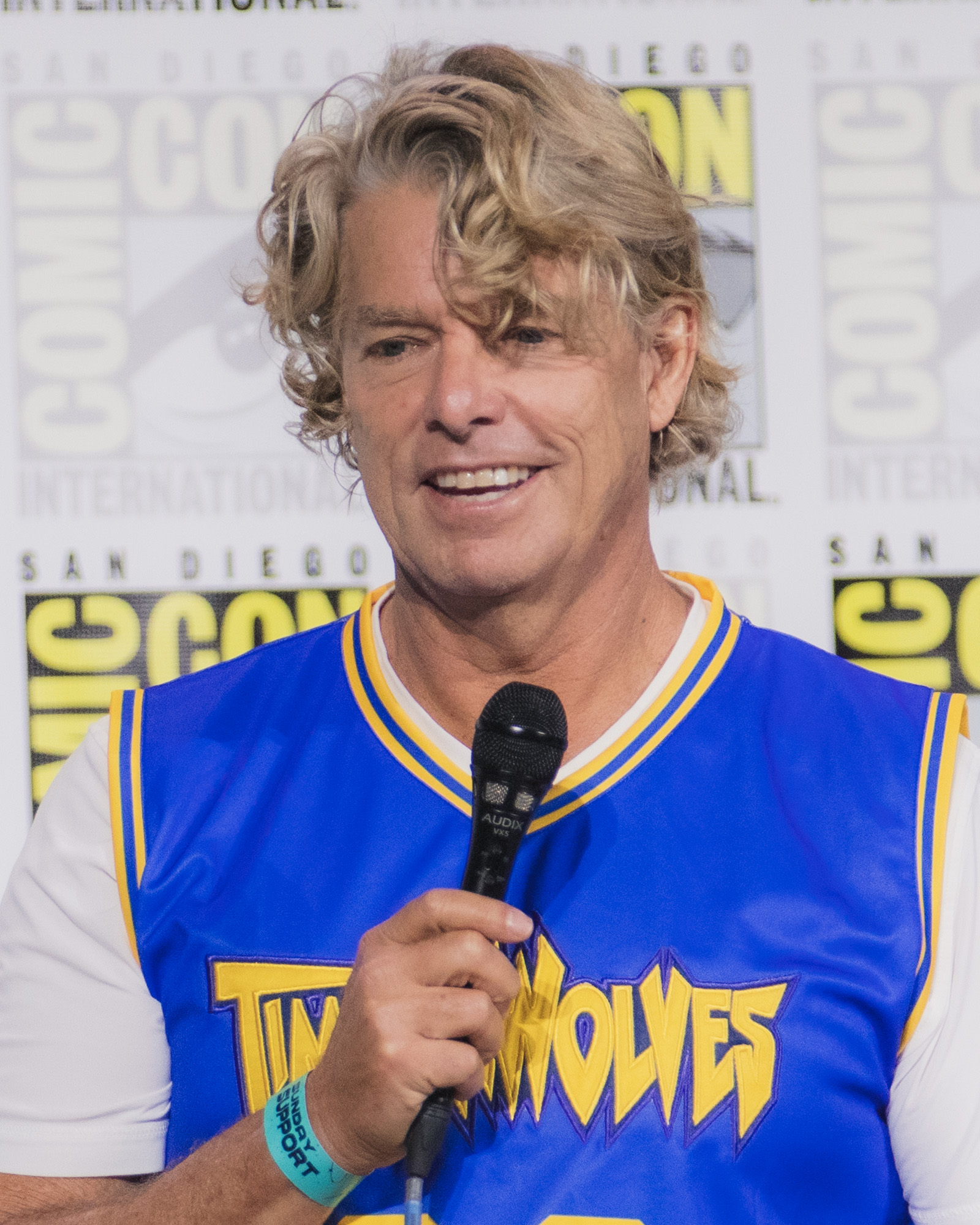
- Vince in 2026
- Born: April 8, 1962 (age 64); Vancouver, British Columbia, Canada
- Other name: Robbert Vince
- Occupations: Director, producer, writer, screenwriter
- Years active: 1988–present

Robert Vince (born April 8, 1962) is a Canadian director, producer, writer and screenwriter. He has been involved in movie production since the late 1980s and has been directing movies since 2000, such as MVP: Most Valuable Primate, the Air Buddies series, and Chestnut: Hero of Central Park.

== Career ==
Vince is a native of Vancouver and CEO of Key Pix Productions. Much of Vince's work deals with children and talking dog/animal franchises, most notably his directorial work for the Air Bud and Buddies series. His directing credits include all of the Buddies franchise films, in addition the Santa Paws subseries, the MVP series, and the Pup Star series.

Vince was previously affiliated with Keystone Entertainment, where he produced, co-wrote and directed more than 33 films, primarily in partnership with Disney, Miramax and Warner Bros. Vince has two sons and splits his time between his two main offices in Malibu and Vancouver.

== Personal life ==
Vince is the brother of William Vince, who was also a producer. Robert graduated Class of 1985 from Mount Allison University.

== Filmography ==
=== Films ===
Year	Title	Director	Writer	Producer
1999	The Duke	No	Yes	Executive
2000	MVP: Most Valuable Primate	Yes	Yes	Executive
2000	Air Bud: World Pup	No	Yes	Executive
2001	MVP 2: Most Vertical Primate	Yes	Yes	Yes
2002	Air Bud: Seventh Inning Fetch	Yes	Story	Yes
2003	Spymate	Yes	Yes	Yes
2003	Air Bud: Spikes Back	No	Story	Yes
2004	MXP: Most Xtreme Primate	Yes	Story	Yes
2004	Chestnut: Hero of Central Park	Yes	No	Yes
2006	Air Buddies	Yes	Yes	Yes
2008	Snow Buddies	Yes	Yes	Yes
2009	Space Buddies	Yes	Yes	Yes
2009	Santa Buddies	Yes	Yes	Yes
2010	The Search for Santa Paws	Yes	Yes	Yes
2011	Spooky Buddies	Yes	Yes	Yes
2012	Treasure Buddies	Yes	Yes	Yes
2012	Santa Paws 2: The Santa Pups	Yes	Yes	Yes
2013	Super Buddies	Yes	Yes	Yes
2015	Russell Madness	Yes	Yes	Executive
2016	Monkey Up	Yes	Yes	Executive
2016	Pup Star	Yes	Yes	Executive
2017	Pup Star: Better 2Gether	Yes	Yes	Executive
2018	Pup Star: World Tour	Yes	Yes	Executive
2018	Puppy Star Christmas	Yes	Yes	Executive

==== Producer only ====
- Millenium (1989) (Co-producer)
- Cafe Romeo (1991)
- Black Ice (1992)
- Tomcat: Dangerous Desires (1993)
- Anything for Love (1993)
- Bulletproof Heart (1995)
- Malicious (1995)
- The Final Cut (1995)
- Underworld (1996)
- Air Bud (1997)
- Hoods (1998)
- Air Bud: Golden Receiver (1998)

=== Television ===
Year	Title	Director	Executive Producer	Writer	Notes
2019	Pup Academy	Yes	Yes	Yes	
2020	Russell Maniac	Yes	Yes	Yes	Also Creator
2021	Scaredy Cats	Yes	Yes	No	
2022	Super Pupz	Yes	Yes	Yes	
2022	Phantom Pups	Yes	Yes	Yes	Also Creator
