= The Yesterday Machine =

- Promotional poster
- Directed by: Russ Marker
- Screenplay by: Russ Marker
- Produced by: Russ Marker
- Starring: Tim Holt; James Britton; Jack Herman; Ann Pellegrino; Robert Bob Kelly
- Cinematography: Ralph K. Johnson
- Music by: Don Zimmers
- Production company: Carter Film Productions
- Release date: 1963
- Running time: 85 minutes
- Country: United States
- Language: English

The film

The Yesterday Machine is a regional American science fiction film written, produced, and directed by Russ Marker. It stars Tim Holt, James Britton, Ann Pellegrino, and Jack Herman. Various sources give the film's release date as 1963, 1965, and 1966.

In the story, a newspaper reporter, a nightclub singer, and the singer's sister fall into the hands of a mad Nazi physicist who has developed a time travel machine with which he intends to snatch Adolf Hitler from the past, teleport him into the present, and forever bring the world under the brutal domination of the Third Reich.

== Plot ==
College drum majorette Margie De Mar twirls her baton as boyfriend Howie Ellison, a cheerleader, tries unsuccessfully to repair his broken-down car so that they can get to a football game on time. As they walk to a farmhouse for help, they stumble upon two American Civil War Confederate soldiers. Confused and frightened, they run away, but Howie is shot. He stumbles back to the car, collapses, and is taken to hospital by a passing motorist. Margie simply disappears.

Newspaper reporter Jim Crandell is covering the shooting. At the hospital, Dr. Wilson D. Blake tells him that Howie had been struck by a minié ball fired from a Civil War-era rifled musket.

Police Lt. Partane and Det. Lasky, who are investigating, go to the nightclub where Margie's sister Sandy is singing. Partane informs her that Margie has gone missing. Sandy asks Jim to take her to the site where Margie vanished. They find nothing.

The next morning, Jim discusses the case with Partane. He tells Jim that at the end of World War II his army unit had liberated an unusual concentration camp, in which the prisoners were all young and well-fed. A nearby bombed-out building contained an electronic machine that couldn't be identified. Partane speculates that the machine had been a time travel device. The commandant of the camp, physicist Ernst Von Hauser, was never captured.

Sandy and Jim return to where Margie disappeared. Still not finding anything, they walk through an unexpected, unexplained, invisible something in a field and find themselves in 1789. Then, suddenly, they're beneath the farmhouse, in Von Hauser's lab, teleported there by a time machine which operates on the principle of "super spectronic relativity," a discovery of Von Hauser's in which light is made to travel faster than the speed of light as calculated by Albert Einstein. His plan is to bring Hitler back from wartime Germany to the present-day US so that the Führer - who will become immortal during teleportation - can forever rule the world. Von Hauser is also holding Margie captive.

Manfred, one of Von Hauser's two Nazi "assistants," takes Sandy to Margie's cell and locks her in. Jim is locked up, too. Manfred drags Margie to the lab. Didiyama, a slave from ancient Egypt, who now serves Von Hauser, brings Jim and Sandy food. But when Manfred returns and ominously approaches Sandy in the cell, Didiyama stabs him in the back. Before he dies, he manages to strangle Didiyama to death. Sandy uses his keys to free Jim from his cell. Jim picks up Manfred's pistol.

Sandy and Jim rush to the lab, where they find Von Hauser about to teleport Margie into the future - something he's never done before and isn't sure will work. Wolf, the other Nazi thug, fires a shot at Jim but misses. Jim shoots Wolf, who collapses. Jim forces Von Hauser at gunpoint to bring Margie back. She returns unhurt. But as Sandy, Margie and Jim try to escape, the not-quite-dead Wolf gets off another shot. He misses again; Jim doesn't. Jim then put several rounds into the time machine's control panel, disabling it.

By this time, Partane and Lasky are outside the farmhouse. Jim, Sandy and Margie emerge from a false grave in a cemetery. Jim tells Partane that it leads to the lab. Partane and Lasky go down, where they find Von Hauser trying to teleport himself in the still-working time machine. Von Hauser shoots at him, but Partane returns fire, apparently killing him. Von Hauser vanishes before their eyes, going somewhere and someplace else in time.

Partane destroys the time machine, thus ending the Nazi threat.

== Cast ==
- Tim Holt as Lt. Fred Partane
- James Britton as Jim Crandell
- Ann Pellegrino as Sandy De Mar
- Jack Herman as Prof. Ernst Von Hauser
- Linda Jenkins as Margie De Mar
- Jay Ramsey as Howie Ellison
- Bob Brown as Dr. Wilson D. Blake
- Carol Gilley as Blonde Nurse
- Robert Kelly as Det. Lasky
- Bill Thurman as Detective
- Olga Powell as Didiyama
- Patrick Cranshaw as Confederate
- Ramon Lance Legar as Ramon
- Charles Young
- Marvin Seabright
- Lee Arthur
- Charles McLine
- Robert Peel
- Carolyn Adams
- James L. Howe
- Frank Cole
- David Beckham
- Jerry Brown

== Production ==
The Yesterday Machine is a regional movie, following film historian Brian Albright's definition. Regional films in general "were conceived, produced and often distributed entirely in corners of the country not typically associated with the entertainment industry - from the backwoods of Utah to the bayous of Louisiana to the outer boroughs of New York. Made with little regard to genre convention, or in some cases even any basic knowledge of filmmaking, by the 1970s" - when The Yesterday Machine was still playing in drive-in theatres - "these regional indies were at the vanguard of horror cinema." Such horror and science fiction films were made on low budgets and usually with production crews and actors who were local to the shooting location, in this case, in and around Dallas TX. The movie was partly filmed at the Studio Recording Office in Dallas, a business run by Nick Nicholas, the film's music director.

While several sources date the film to 1963, Bryan Senn gives it a date of 1965 and Albright, in his introduction to an interview with Marker, says 1966. The automobile enthusiast users of the Internet Movie Cars Database dispute the 1963 date, having spotted in the film a 1964 Rambler American, a 1964 Ford Galaxie 500, and a 1965 Dodge Dart. Prints of the film show an undated copyright to Carter Films.

Marker told Albright in an interview that he got the idea for The Yesterday Machine shortly after World War II from reading press reports of Nazi super-weapons that had been planned but never built. He described the script as speculating about what might have happened if one of the super-weapons had been a time-travel device and had actually been made. Besides writing the script - as well as producing and directing the film - Marker also wrote the lyrics to "Leave Me Alone," which Pellegrino sings on-camera during the nightclub sequence.

In the same interview, Marker said that the film was financed by several millionaires of his acquaintance, all World War II veterans, who "thought it was a damn good idea for a movie." As for himself, Marker said that he made "a few thousand dollars" from The Yesterday Machine.

== Release ==
The Yesterday Machine was released on 3 June 1965.

== Distribution ==
According to Albright, the film received "limited distribution" by Interstate Theaters, a Dallas-based chain of movie theatres. It "appears to have played Texas drive-ins as late as 1974" but was perhaps not shown outside that state. The Yesterday Machine has been distributed on DVD for home viewing several times, including as a single-film disc from Origin Arts, issued on 20 March 2007, and as a double feature with Destination Space (1959) by Alpha Video on 28 April 2015.

== Reception ==
Film historian Fraser A. Sherman places The Yesterday Machine into a category of science fiction movies typified by "Time travel by suspended animation, enhanced sleep or the Einsteinian effects of faster-than-light travel." He writes that while other categories exist, "Changing history is a relatively minor part of big- and small-screen time travel stories."

While the theme of changing history through time travel is minor, the few critics who have written about the film have not been impressed by its relative novelty. Senns says that "The talky script remains deadly dull, and nothing even remotely resembling action takes place." For example, "The old Nazi scientist takes up nearly fifteen minutes of screen time alternately raving about the Third Reich or offering up lengthy, ridiculous scientific explanation" of how "super spectronic relativity" works. Senn's conclusion is that "The Yesterday Machine turns out to be a time-travel film that deserves to be lost in the past."

In a short review, critic Donald C. Wills proposes that the film has "Two possible themes here: How SF Movies Revive the Nazis, and How Bad Can a Movie Be? (Not much worse, assuredly, than this one). The first half here is dull 'teaser' stuff; Herman's campily colorful mad physicist enlivens the latter half, when the movie becomes comically 'ambitious.'"

Critic Paul Gaita of Allmovie pans the film. He writes, "The camp value of this off-kilter science fiction effort (...) is seriously undermined by a dreary pace, comparable to a period educational film. This analogy reaches a terminal point when, late in the film, the scientist pulls out a chalkboard and begins drawing diagrams to help the captured reporter understand the workings of his machine and time travel in general."

The film may have inspired some parts of The Rocky Horror Show and The Rocky Horror Picture Show in its cliches.

== See also ==
- List of American films of 1963
- B movie
