= Paul Rae =

American actor (born 1968)

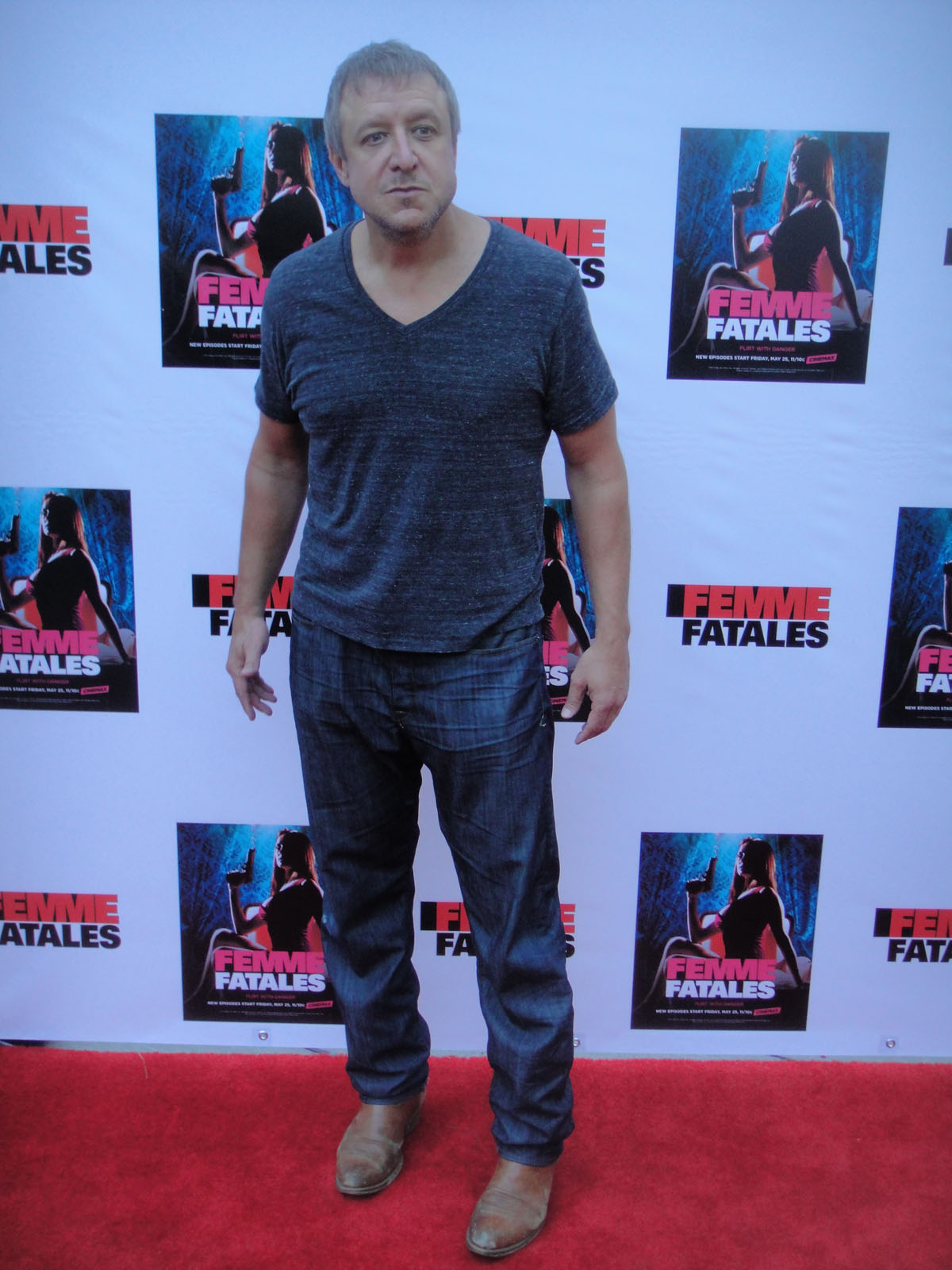
- Rae in 2012
- Born: Paul Rae Stuart; June 27, 1968 (age 57); New Orleans, Louisiana, U.S.
- Occupations: Actor; director; writer
- Years active: 2002–present

Paul Rae (born June 27, 1968) is an American actor.

== Biography ==
Rae was born Paul Rae Stuart in New Orleans, Louisiana, the son of Jean Rushing and the late Norman Stuart, and was raised in Bogalusa, Washington Parish, Louisiana. He graduated from Bogalusa High School in 1986.

== Filmography ==
=== Film ===
Year	Title	Role	Notes
2002	The Package	Miller	Short film
2004	Such's Life	Raymond Such	Short film
2005	Coach Carter	Guardian	
2005	Ulli Lommel's Zodiac Killer	Arms Dealer	Direct-to-video; as Paul R. Stuart
2006	The Last Supper	Simon	Short film
2006	Air Buddies	Denning	Direct-to-video
2007	Next	Road Crew Foreman	
2007	The Wind Fisherman	Interviewer	Short film
2007	Daddy Day Camp	Phil Ryerson	
2007	I Gotta Be Better Than Keanu	Restaurant Boss	
2007	South of Pico	Jerry	
2008	Snow Buddies	Phillipe	Direct-to-video
2008	The Last Lullaby	Ellis	
2008	CU@ED's	Flower Shop Guy	Short film
2008	Solar Flare	John the Drunk Customer	
2008	W.	Kent Hance	
2009	Wake	Officer Dobbs	
2009	Midgets Vs. Mascots	Eddie Slaten	
2009	Santa Buddies	Hank	Direct-to-video
2010	L.A. Vampire	Megan's Date	Short film
2010	Shop Secret	Big Boy	Short film
2010	Black Red Yellow	Pete Mirandi	Short film
2010	The Kane Files: Life of Trial	Jeremy	
2010	True Grit	Emmett Quincy	
2012	Santa Paws 2: The Santa Pups	Jeb Gibson	
2013	Texas Chainsaw 3D	Mayor Burt Hartman	
2013	Inside	Anthony	
2013	Australian Pilot Season	Producer	Short film
2014	The Lachrymist	Mr. Mundt	Short film
2014	Zugzwang	Maury Kellogg	Short film
2014	Some Kind of Beautiful	Chad	
2015	ToY	Conrad	
2016	No Way to Live	Earl Thompson	
2016	Three Skeleton Key	Jim Beal	Short film
2016	The Tow	The Tow Truck Driver	Short film
2016	Shangri-La Suite	Memphis Mafioso	
2017	Dark Meridian	Coda	
2017	Father/Son	Hank	Short film
2017	Carter & June	Commissioner Reid	
2018	The Open House	Plumber	
2018	The Ballad of Buster Scruggs	Chicken Impresario	Segment: "Meal Ticket"
2021	Bad Detectives	Detective Weezul	
2023	The Channel	Bill	

=== Television ===
Year	Title	Role	Notes
2003	Sabrina the Teenage Witch	Rodie	Episode: "Getting to Nose You"
2003	CSI: Crime Scene Investigation	Wesley Jones	Episode: "Feeling the Heat"
2003	Star Trek: Enterprise	Bartender	Episode: "North Star"
2003	The Handler	Phil	Episode: "Hardcore"
2004	The Division	Craig Larsen	Episode: "Acts of Desperation"
2004	Las Vegas	Roy Holden	Episode: "New Orleans"
2004–2006	The West Wing	Walter	Episodes: "In the Room" and "Duck and Cover"
2005	Monk	Mr. Handy	Episode: "Mr. Monk Gets Cabin Fever"
2005	Desperate Housewives	Hector	Episodes: "Children Will Listen" and "Live Alone and Like It"
2005	NCIS	Steve Hager	Episode: "Hometown Hero"
2006	Prescriptions	Detective Goodman	
2006	Malcolm in the Middle	Cop	Episode: "Hal's Dentist"
2007	Bone Eater	Neil Elroy	Television film
2007	Girl Positive	Coach Fulmer	Television film
2007	Moonlight	Tom	Episode: "Sleeping Beauty"
2007	The Closer	Rodney Cox	Episode: "Dumb Luck"
2008	The Circuit	Robyn Cates	Television film
2008	House	Jeff	Episode: "No More Mr. Nice Guy"
2008	Californication	Zed	Episode: "The Great Ashby"
2009	Eleventh Hour	Leon	Episode: "H2O"
2009	Criminal Minds	Lucas Turner	Episode: "To Hell... And Back"
2009	Fringe	Donald Long	Episode: "August"
2009	Hydra	Alex Williams	Television film
2010	Memphis Beat	Louis "Red" Jones	Episode: "Polk Salad Annie"
2010	Jonas	Gus	Episode: "Band of Brothers"
2011	Good Luck Charlie	Mike Gogan	Episode: "Alley Oops"
2012	Underbelly	Stuart	
2012	Femme Fatales	Guard	Episode: "Crazy Mary"
2013	Justified	Patterson Gaines	Episode: "This Bird Has Flown"
2013	Eagle Heart	Junkyard Steve	Episode: "Bowsley"
2013	Mad Men	Byron Poole	Episode: "The Quality of Mercy"
2013	Supernatural	Irv Franklin	Episode: "Devil May Care"
2014	Legit	Joe	Episode: "Homeless"
2014	True Blood	Dark Figure	Episode: "Jesus Gonna Be Here"
2015	Aquarius	Marvin Schill	Episodes: "The Hunter Gets Captured by the Game" and "Home Is Where You're Happy"
2015	Blood & Oil	Garry Laframboise	Recurring role; 8 episodes
2017	Brockmire	Dale	Recurring role; 8 episodes
2017	Tim and Eric's Bedtime Stories	Buck	Episode: "Butter"
2017–2018	Damnation	Melvin Stubbs	Recurring role; 6 episodes
2018	Patriot	Jeff "One Legged Cop"	Recurring role; 5 episodes
2022	The Lincoln Lawyer	Bruce Carlin	Recurring Role
