= Inside (2013 film) =

2012 American horror film directed by Daryn Tufts

- Directed by: Daryn Tufts
- Written by: Daryn Tufts
- Produced by: David Wulf; Maclain Nelson; TR Gourley; Ken Bretschneider
- Starring: Luke Goss; Paul Rae; Isaac C. Singleton, Jr. Derek Phillips; Brett Merritt; Renee Casati
- Cinematography: Brian Sullivan
- Production company: Deep Studios
- Release date: November 2, 2013 (Japan)
- Country: United States
- Language: English

Inside is a 2013 American horror film written and directed by Daryn Tufts, and starring Luke Goss, Paul Rae, Isaac Singleton, and Derek Phillips.

== Plot ==
After succumbing to a drug addiction that cost him his job, almost all of his money, and his dignity, Miles Berrett is entering his new home: a tiny cell in an old, run-down prison. Determined to get his life back on track, Miles plans to serve his time and make things right with his wife and daughter.

While asleep on his bunk during his first night locked up, Miles is ripped awake by a terrifying crash. A moment later, in the dark, guards rush past his cell. Working with Anthony, the "lifer" in the cell next to him, Miles tries to determine what is going on, but this is unlike anything that has ever happened in this prison. Soon, Miles and Anthony hear gunfire. And then screaming... the horrible, sickening screams of a man being torn apart. Something bad is happening in this prison.

Outside of his cell, through the darkness, Miles can hear other inmates talking, yelling—trying to figure out what is happening. A voice over a PA system instructs all of the prisoners to remain calm and quiet. "There has been a situation. It has been contained." But Miles and Anthony know that is a lie. Something is loose in the prison, and it is killing the guards.

After some time, Miles understands that there are no prison guards left and that the thing outside his cell is connected to him.

== Cast ==
- Luke Goss as Miles Barrett
- Paul Rae as Anthony
- Isaac C. Singleton, Jr. as Russell
- Derek Phillips as Grant Carter
- Renee Casati as Rachel Barrett
- Brett Merritt as Cody Young
- Anne Forester as News Reporter

== Production ==
Principal photography took place June 2011, in Provo, Utah at the Old Utah County Jail.
