= Air Bud: Golden Receiver =

1998 film by Richard Martin

- Theatrical release poster
- Directed by: Richard Martin
- Screenplay by: Paul Tamasy; Aaron Mendelsohn
- Based on: Characters by Paul Tamasy; Aaron Mendelsohn; Kevin DiCicco
- Produced by: Robert Vince
- Starring: Kevin Zegers; Gregory Harrison; Cynthia Stevenson; Nora Dunn; Perry Anzilotti; Robert Costanzo
- Cinematography: Mike Southon
- Edited by: Bruce Lange; Melinda Seabrook
- Music by: Brahm Wenger
- Production company: Keystone Pictures (Note: As Golden Receiver Productions Inc.)
- Distributed by: Alliance Releasing (Canada); Dimension Films (United States)
- Release date: August 14, 1998
- Running time: 90 minutes
- Countries: Canada; United States
- Language: English
- Box office: $10.2 million

Air Bud: Golden Receiver (also known as Air Bud 2) is a 1998 sports comedy film directed by Richard Martin. It is the sequel to Air Bud. The film was shot in Vancouver, British Columbia, Canada. It is also the second Air Bud film to be released theatrically. Outside the United States, the film was often titled Air Bud 2. This film is dedicated in memory of the original Air Bud (Buddy), who died of Synovial sarcoma several months before the film's release.

Air Bud: Golden Receiver was released by Alliance Releasing in Canada and by Dimension Films in the United States on August 14, 1998. It grossed $10.2 million and received negative reviews.

== Plot ==
In Fernfield, Washington, Josh Framm, now a teenager and a basketball player, becomes angry with his mother, Jackie, when she begins dating Patrick Sullivan, the town's new veterinarian. Patrick innocently tosses Josh's basketball-savvy dog, Buddy, a football one day. Josh discovers that Buddy also has an uncanny ability to play the sport of football. After his best friend Tom convinces Josh to sign up for football, Buddy plays on Josh's junior high football team, the Timberwolves. At first, the team is failing miserably, with the school intending to fire Coach Fanelli. Thanks to Buddy's excellent athletic skills and speed, however, the team has a streak of wins and makes the playoffs, advancing to the championship.

Meanwhile, two Russians, Popov and Natalya, kidnap Buddy in the hope of having him perform as the unique attraction in a Russian circus. At the same time, when Patrick proposes to his mother, Josh runs away. Coach Fanelli finds him at the train station and convinces him that just because Patrick is in his life now, he does not have to stop loving his father. Josh returns home, but Patrick and Buddy are gone.

The Timberwolves must play the championship game without Buddy and are losing terribly. With the help of a chimpanzee who is also held captive, Buddy escapes from Natalya and Popov. Buddy and the chimpanzee release all the other captive animals, and they escape. Popov and Natalya are ambushed by the chimpanzee, their former captive, in a warehouse. Following this, they chase after Buddy in a van, but Patrick rescues Buddy after he sees the fireworks that the escaping animals set off. Patrick and Buddy dodge the van, and Natalya and Popov crash into a bollard on the pier. They are subsequently arrested and placed into the custody of the Russian embassy.

Patrick then takes Buddy to the game. The team catches up, but Buddy is taken out of the game due to an injury. The Timberwolves are forced to finish the game without him. Due to efforts by Josh and Tom, the Timberwolves win the championship.

The following day, Josh stops Patrick from leaving and convinces him to stay with him and his family. A few months later, the family goes to a Seattle Seahawks game, where Buddy sneaks onto the field and catches the ball.

== Cast ==
- Kevin Zegers as Josh Framm, Buddy's owner
- Gregory Harrison as Dr. Patrick Sullivan, Jackie's boyfriend
- Cynthia Stevenson as Jackie Framm, Josh's widowed mother
- Nora Dunn as Natalya
- Perry Anzilotti as Popov, Natalya's assistant
- Robert Costanzo as Jimmy Fanelli, the coach of Timberwolves
- Warren Moon as Himself, the number 1 from Seattle Seahawks
- Joey Galloway as Himself, the number 84 from Seattle Seahawks
- Blue Edwards as Himself, the number 30 from Vancouver Grizzlies
- Pete Chilcutt as Himself, the number 23 from Vancouver Grizzlies
- George Lynch as Himself, the number 9 from Vancouver Grizzlies
- Sam Mack as Himself, the number 8 from Vancouver Grizzlies
- Lee Mayberry as Himself, the number 11 from Vancouver Grizzlies
- Ivano Newbill as Himself, the number 40 from Vancouver Grizzlies
- Tim Conway as Fred Davis, the co-commentator of Fernfield Football Field
- Dick Martin as Phil Phil, the co-commentator of Fernfield Football Field
- Suzanne Ristic as Principal Salter, the principal of Fernfield High School
- Shayn Solberg as Tom Stewart, Josh's best friend
- Alyson MacLaren as Andrea Framm, Josh's younger sister
- Rush, Chase, Zak, and Chance as Buddy

== Production ==
Following the release of Air Bud, Keystone Entertainment stated that there were no plans for a sequel as Buddy's right hind leg had been amputated as a result of synovial cell sarcoma. However, this turned out to be untrue, as Air Bud: Golden Receiver went into production soon afterward.

By April 1998, Buddy’s owner, Kevin DiCicco, had a falling out with Keystone and producer Robert Vince. DiCicco said the sequel had been made without his involvement and also claimed he had not been paid the percentage of merchandise and profits he was promised for his work on the first film.

== Home media ==
Air Bud: Golden Receiver was released on VHS on December 15, 1998, and later released on DVD in 2000. Walt Disney Studios Home Entertainment continued its line of Air Bud Special Edition DVDs with the release of Air Bud: Golden Receiver Special Edition on February 2, 2010. The special edition includes a play-by-play action exclusive Sports Channel by the Buddies (the pups of Air Bud), led by Budderball.

Mill Creek Entertainment reissued the film on January 14, 2020, on a 2-disc boxset also containing other Air Bud films owned by Air Bud Entertainment.

All five Air Bud films, including Golden Receiver, arrived on Disney+ on October 1, 2023.

== Critical reception ==
On Rotten Tomatoes, Air Bud: Golden Receiver holds an approval rating of 21% based on 29 reviews, with an average rating of 4.3/10.

Audiences polled by CinemaScore gave the film an average grade of "A-" on an A+ to F scale.

== See also ==
- List of American football films
