= Under Age (1964 film) =

1964 film by Larry Buchanan

- Title screen of movie
- Directed by: Larry Buchanan
- Written by: Larry Buchanan; Harold Hoffman
- Produced by: Harold Hoffman
- Starring: Annabelle Weenick; Judy Adler; Roland Royter
- Cinematography: Henry A. Kokojan
- Edited by: Larry Buchanan
- Distributed by: American International Pictures
- Release date: March 1964
- Running time: 90 min
- Country: United States
- Language: English

Under Age is a 1964 black-and-white film written and directed by Larry Buchanan and starring Annabelle Weenick, Judy Adler and Roland Royter. The film was shot in Dallas, Texas.

== Plot ==
A woman from Dallas goes on trial, charged with encouraging her 14-year-old daughter to have sex with a 16-year-old Mexican boy.

== Cast ==
- Annabelle Weenick as Ruby Jenkins (as Anne McAdams)
- Judy Adler as Linda Jenkins
- Roland Royter as George Gomez
- George R. Russell as D.A. Tyler
- John Hicks as Prosecutor Adkins
- George Edgley as The Judge
- Tommie Russell as Mrs. Sybel Riley
- Regina Cassidy as Dr. Vivian Scott
- Patrick Cranshaw as W.J. Earnhardt (as Joseph Patrick Cranshaw)
- Raymond Bradford as Wilbur Neal
- Jonathan Ledford as Barney Jenkins
- Howard Ware as Bailiff
- Joreta C. Cherry as Court Reporter
- Robert B. Alcott as Assistant District Attorney (as Robert Alcott)
- Bill Peck as News Photographer (as William Peck)

== Production ==
Under Age was produced by American International Pictures (AIP). Following the success of Buchanan's previous courtroom drama Free, White and 21, AIP co-founder Samuel Z. Arkoff encouraged the filmmakers to create a similar film specifically targeted at young people. The plot was based on a real-life court case in which a woman, Wanda Duckworth, was found guilty of rape and jailed for encouraging her 15-year-old daughter to have sex with a 17-year-old male. A number of actors from Free, White and 21 returned for this film, playing the same characters.

== Reception ==
Under Age was given a minor release by AIP. When the film did poorly in theaters, Buchanan said he would never again do a "courtroom picture", though due to current events he soon made The Trial of Lee Harvey Oswald.
