= Patrick Cranshaw =

American actor (1919–2005)

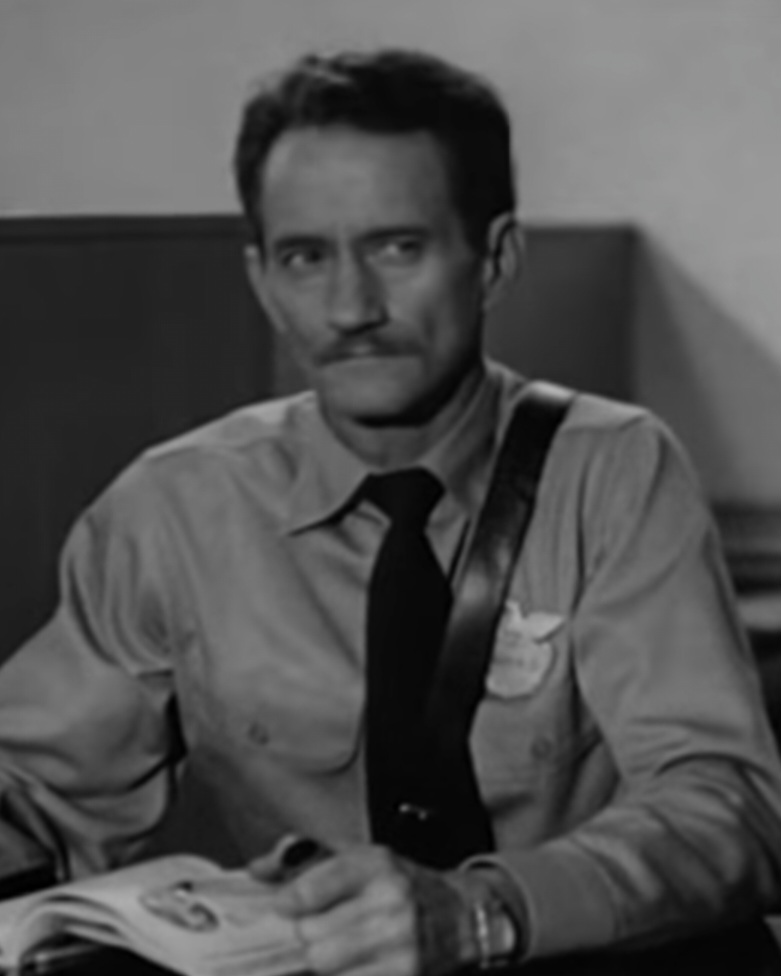
- Cranshaw in The Amazing Transparent Man (1960)
- Born: Joseph Patrick Cranshaw; June 17, 1919; Bartlesville, Oklahoma, U.S.
- Died: December 28, 2005 (aged 86); Fort Worth, Texas, U.S.
- Resting place: Restland Memorial Park, Dallas County, Texas
- Occupation: Actor
- Years active: 1950–2005

Joseph Patrick Cranshaw (June 17, 1919 – December 28, 2005) was an American character actor known for his distinctive look and deadpan humor. He is best known for one of his last roles, that of Joseph "Blue" Pulaski, a fraternity brother, in the 2003 film Old School. It had been said that this role helped him achieve "pop-culture status".

== Early life ==
Cranshaw was born in Bartlesville, Oklahoma, and became interested in acting while entertaining American troops as a member of the Army Air Forces before World War II.

== Career ==
Cranshaw began his screen acting career in 1955 when he was 36 in the uncredited role of a bar tender at a dance in the western Texas Lady.

Despite an acting span of more than 40 years and some 102 appearances, Cranshaw's first credited film role came at the age of 41, in The Amazing Transparent Man (1960). Cranshaw's mild-mannered and gentlemanly demeanor led him to a number of roles as bank tellers, store managers, and grandfathers. His major credits include Bonnie and Clyde (1967), Bandelero! (1968) Sgt. Pepper's Lonely Hearts Club Band (1978), Pee-wee's Big Adventure (1985), Moving (1988), The Hudsucker Proxy (1994), Everyone Says I Love You (1996), Nothing to Lose (1997), Almost Heroes (1998), Broken Vessels (1998), Best in Show (2000), Bubble Boy (2001), Old School (2003), My Boss's Daughter (2003), and Herbie: Fully Loaded (2005).

He also appeared in more than 50 television series, including Green Acres, Sanford and Son, Alice, AfterMASH, Little House on the Prairie, Mork & Mindy, The Dukes of Hazzard, Night Court, Growing Pains, Married... with Children, Coach, The Drew Carey Show, and Just Shoot Me!.

== Death ==
Cranshaw died of pneumonia at his Fort Worth, Texas home, aged 86. He is interred at Restland Memorial Park in Dallas County, Texas.

Months earlier, his son, Freddie L. Cranshaw, had killed four people and himself in a shooting rampage at a church in Sachse, Texas.

== Selected filmography ==
- The Amazing Transparent Man (1960) – Security Guard
- The Yesterday Machine (1963) – Confederate Soldier
- Under Age (1964) – W.J. Earnhardt
- Bonnie and Clyde (1967) – Bank Teller (uncredited)
- Bandolero! (1968) – Bank Clerk
- Green Acres (1970) – Old Man
- Adam-12 (1974) – Mr. Ferguson
- Nightmare Honeymoon (1974) – Old Bail Boy
- Sanford and Son (1976) – Bank Guard
- Slumber Party '57 (1976) – Store Owner
- Alice (1976–78) – Andy
- Thunder and Lightning (1977) – Taylor
- Sgt. Pepper's Lonely Hearts Club Band (1978) – Western Union Messenger
- Little House on the Prairie (1978–80) – Manuel Barton, Spokes
- Mork & Mindy (1978–82) – The Man in the Store, The Old Man, Jake Loomis
- The New Adventures of Wonder Woman (1979) – Codger
- The Dukes of Hazzard (1979–80) – Doctor, Doc Petticord
- The Private Eyes (1980) – Roy
- The Gong Show Movie (1980) – Man Dying in Elevator
- CHiPs (1980) – Carpenter
- Yes, Giorgio (1982) – Man on Gurney
- Diff'rent Strokes (1983–84) – Mr. Clemens, Old Man
- AfterMASH (1983) – Bob Scannell
- Highway to Heaven (1984) – Clark
- Night Court (1984–85) – Mr. MacNulty, Mr. Shelton
- Pee-wee's Big Adventure (1985) – Hobo
- Perfect Strangers (1986) – Street Person
- Growing Pains (1989) – Reverend Chuck MacGregor
- Married... with Children (1991) – Young Kit
- The Beverly Hillbillies (1993) – Reverend Mason
- The Hudsucker Proxy (1994) – Ancient Sorter
- Coach (1994) – Mr. Knickerbocker
- Everyone Says I Love You (1996) – Grandpa
- The Drew Carey Show (1997) – Gerald Thompson
- Nothing to Lose (1997) – Henry
- Broken Vessels (1998) – Gramps
- Almost Heroes (1998) – Jackson
- Just Shoot Me! (1998) – Cowboy Pete
- MVP: Most Valuable Primate (2000) – Ron
- Best in Show (2000) – Leslie Ward Cabot
- Bubble Boy (2001) – Pappy / Pippy
- MVP: Most Vertical Primate (2001) – Ron
- Air Bud: Seventh Inning Fetch (2002) – Sheriff Bob
- Frank McKlusky, C.I. (2002) – The Old Man
- Old School (2003) – Blue
- Air Bud: Spikes Back (2003) – Sheriff Bob
- My Boss's Daughter (2003) – Old Man
- Breakin' All the Rules (2004) – Mr. Lynch
- Herbie: Fully Loaded (2005) – Jimmy D.
- Air Buddies (2006) – Sheriff Bob (final film role, posthumous release)
