= Cynthia Stevenson =

American actress (born 1962)

- Born: August 2, 1962 (age 64); Oakland, California, U.S.
- Occupation: Actress
- Years active: 1986–2021
- Spouse: Tom Davies (m. 1992)
- Children: 1

Cynthia Stevenson (born August 2, 1962) is an American-Canadian actress. She first played a leading role in the single season of the syndicated parody comedy series My Talk Show (1990–91), before starring in a number of sitcoms, including Bob (CBS, 1992–93), Hope & Gloria (NBC, 1995–96), and Oh Baby (Lifetime, 1998–2000).

Stevenson made her big screen debut in Robert Altman's 1992 satirical film The Player. She later appeared in a number of films including Forget Paris (1995), Home for the Holidays (1995), Happiness (1998), Air Bud: Golden Receiver (1998) and its sequels, and Agent Cody Banks (2003) and its sequel. Stevenson also starred in the Showtime comedy-drama Dead Like Me (2003–04) and the ABC comedy-drama Men in Trees (2006–08). Her last role was a guest appearance in a 2021 episode of The Good Doctor.

== Early life, family and education ==
Stevenson was born in Oakland, California, on August 2, 1962, and raised in the small (1.7 sq mi (4.4 km^{2})) city of Piedmont, enclaved within Oakland.

The family relocated to Vancouver, British Columbia, Canada, when she was 10 years old. She lived there until she was 20 years old.

She attended the University of Victoria, in British Columbia.

== Career ==
In 1986, Stevenson made her television debut as a cast member of the syndicated sketch comedy show Off The Wall. In 1987, she appeared in an episode of Max Headroom. She later starred in the made-for-television movies A Father's Homecoming and Double Your Pleasure, and played a leading role alongside Suzie Plakson in the 1989 pilot for Married to the Mob. Also in 1989, she appeared as Norm Peterson's obsessive secretary Doris in two episodes of Cheers.

=== 1990s ===
Stevenson played a leading role in the short-lived syndicated comedy series My Talk Show from 1990 to 1991. The following year, she was cast alongside Bob Newhart and Carlene Watkins in the CBS sitcom Bob). The series was canceled after two seasons. Also in 1992, she made her big screen debut in the comedy film The Player directed by Robert Altman. She later had roles in a number of comedy films, including Watch It (1993), Forget Paris (1995), Home for the Holidays (1995), Live Nude Girls (1995), Happiness (1998), Air Bud: Golden Receiver (1998) and its sequels. From 1995 to 1996, she starred as Hope, a high-strung television producer, in the NBC sitcom Hope and Gloria, which ran for two seasons and 35 episodes. In 1998, she played Jane Conrad, former wife of astronaut Pete Conrad in the HBO miniseries From the Earth to the Moon. Later that year, Stevenson began starring as a single working woman who decides to have a child through artificial insemination in the Lifetime comedy series, Oh Baby. The series ended in 2000.

=== 2000s–present ===
Stevenson played mother of Frankie Muniz's character in the 2003 spy comedy film Agent Cody Banks and in its sequel Agent Cody Banks 2 the following year. From 2003 to 2004, she was a regular cast member in the Showtime dark comedy-drama series Dead Like Me, playing lead character George (Ellen Muth)'s mother. In 2009, she starred in its sequel film, Dead like Me: Life After Death. In April 2006, she completed filming a sitcom pilot for CBS called You've Reached the Elliotts, starring opposite Chris Elliott as his wife, which was not picked up by the network. She had a recurring role on the Showtime drama series The L Word, and co-starred with Judy Davis in the 2006 comedy-drama film A Little Thing Called Murder. She also appeared in Six Feet Under, Monk and in multiple episodes of According to Jim. She also appeared in films Neverwas (2005), Full of It (2007), Will You Marry Me? (2008), I Love You, Beth Cooper (2009) and Case 39 (2009).

From 2006 to 2008, Stevenson starred in the ABC comedy-drama series, Men in Trees, which was taped in Vancouver. In April 2009, she co-starred opposite Bob Saget on the short-lived ABC sitcom Surviving Suburbia. In 2010, she had a recurring role as Shiri Appleby's character's mother on The CW drama series Life Unexpected. In 2010, she also appeared in the music video for the song "Fuckin' Perfect" by Pink.

Stevenson appeared in Shonda Rhimes dramas Grey's Anatomy in 2010, Off the Map and Private Practice in 2011, Scandal in 2013, and from 2018 to 2020 played Pam Walsh, Connor's mother on How to Get Away with Murder. In 2014, she played villainous housekeeper in the Lifetime television film Killing Daddy and in 2015, starred alongside Ed Begley Jr. in the TBS comedy series Your Family or Mine.

== Personal life ==
Stevenson married director Tom Davies in 1992; the couple met in 1991, on the set of The Gun in Betty Lou's Handbag, when she filmed a brief uncredited appearance.

== Filmography ==
=== Film ===
Year	Title	Role	Notes
1991	To the Moon, Alice	Perky Girl	Short film
1992	The Player	Bonnie Sherow	
1993	Watch It	Ellen	
1995	Forget Paris	Liz	
1995	Home for the Holidays	Joanne Larson Wedman	
1995	Live Nude Girls	Marcy	
1998	Happiness	Trish Maplewood	National Board of Review Award for Best Acting by an Ensemble
1998	Air Bud: Golden Receiver	Jackie Framm	
2002	Air Bud: Seventh Inning Fetch	Jackie Framm	DVD Exclusive Award for Best Supporting Actress
2003	Agent Cody Banks	Mrs. Banks	
2003	Air Bud Spikes Back	Jackie Framm	
2004	Agent Cody Banks 2: Destination London	Mrs. Banks	
2005	Neverwas	Sally	
2006	Air Buddies	Jackie Framm	
2007	Full of It	Jill Leonard	
2008	Snow Buddies	Jackie Framm	
2009	Dead Like Me: Life After Death	Joy Lass	
2009	Reunion	Emily	
2009	I Love You, Beth Cooper	Mrs. C	
2009	Case 39	Nancy	
2009	Jennifer's Body	Chip's Mom	
2012	Tiger Eyes	Bitsy Kronick	
2018	Baja	Josey Johnson	

=== Television ===
Year	Title	Role	Notes
1986	Off the Wall	Various	Syndicated sketch comedy show
1988	A Father's Homecoming	Toni	Television movie
1989	Newhart	Nancy	Episode: "Shoe Business Is My Life"
1989	Married to the Mob	Marie Scarlotti	Unsold television pilot
1989	Double Your Pleasure	Nicole	Television movie
1989	Cheers	Doris	Episodes: "The Two Faces of Norm" and "Feeble Attraction"
1990	Booker	Penny	Episode: "Hacker"
1990	Empty Nest	Amy	Episode: "Everything But Love"
1990–1991	My Talk Show	Jennifer Bass	Main role, 59 episodes
1991	Major Dad	Anita	Episode: "Flying Solo"
1992–1993	Bob	Trisha McKay	Main role, 28 episodes
1995	Dream On	Abby Kaplow	Episode: "Off-Off Broadway Bound"
1995–1996	Hope and Gloria	Hope Davidson	Main role, 35 episodes
1998	From the Earth to the Moon	Jane Conrad	Television miniseries
1998	Ally McBeal	Hayley Chisolm	Episode: "Alone Again"
1998–2000	Oh Baby	Tracy Calloway	Main role, 44 episodes
2003–2004	Dead Like Me	Joy Lass	Main role, 28 episodes
2005	Six Feet Under	Joy Solomon	Episode: "The Silence"
2005	Joan of Arcadia	Woman at Joan's Award Ceremony	Episode: "The Rise & Fall of Joan Girard"; uncredited
2006	You've Reached the Elliotts	Tracy Elliott	Unsold television pilot
2006	A Little Thing Called Murder	Beverly Bates	Television movie
2006	The L Word	Roberta Collie	3 episodes
2006	Monk	Dianne Brooks	Episode: "Mr. Monk and the Class Reunion"
2003–2007	According to Jim	Cindy Devlin	4 episodes
2006–2008	Men in Trees	Celia Bachelor	Main role, 27 episodes
2008	Will You Merry Me?	Marilyn Kringle	Television movie
2009	Surviving Suburbia	Anne Patterson	Main role, 13 episodes
2010	Grey's Anatomy	Ruthie Carlin	Episode: "Blink"
2010	Life Unexpected	Laverne Cassidy	5 episodes
2011	Off the Map	Charlene	Episode: "Hold on Tight"
2011	Chaos	Violet Green	Episode: "Defending Sophia"
2011	Private Practice	Karen	Episode: "Step One"
2012	The Soul Man	Carolyn	Episode: "How to Be a Church Lady"
2013	Scandal	Mary Nesbitt	Episode: "Mrs. Smith Goes to Washington"
2014	Killing Daddy	Emma Granger	Television movie
2014	Kingdom	Marilyn Wheeler	Episode: "Please Refrain from Crying"
2014	Sleepy Hollow	Gina Lambert	Episode: "Mama"
2015	Your Family or Mine	Jan	Main role
2015	Tim & Eric's Bedtime Stories	Matt's mother	Episode: "Tornado"
2018	Supergirl	Mrs Queller	Episode: "Shelter from the Storm"
2018–2020	How to Get Away with Murder	Pam Walsh	Recurring role, 5 episodes
2021	The Good Doctor	Senator Marian Clark	Episode: "Letting Go"
2027	Yellowjackets	Dr. Brannack	Episode: “Hivemind”
