= William Vince =

Canadian movie producer (1963–2008)

- Born: William D. Vince; November 23, 1963; Vancouver, British Columbia, Canada
- Died: June 21, 2008 (aged 44); West Vancouver, British Columbia, Canada
- Other names: Bill Vince, William D. Vince, Wiliam Vince, William D Vince
- Occupation: Producer
- Years active: 1992–2008

William D. "Bill" Vince (November 23, 1963 – June 21, 2008) was a Canadian producer. His credits include producing Air Bud (1997), Dead Heat (2002), Saved! (2004), and Capote (2005) (for which he shared an Academy Award nomination for Best Picture).

== Personal life ==
Vince was born William D. Vince in British Columbia in 1963.

== Death ==
On June 23, 2008, it was announced that Vince had died two days earlier from a multi-year battle with cancer. At the time of his death, he had been working on Push in post-production with two more films in development, and he had completed production of Edison and Leo and The Imaginarium of Doctor Parnassus. The latter film was dedicated to his memory along with that of Heath Ledger.

== Filmography ==
- Cafe Romeo (1992)
- Tomcat: Dangerous Desires (1993)
- Samurai Cowboy (1993)
- Breaking Point (1993)
- Anything for Love (1993)
- Double Cross (1994)
- Final Round (1994)
- Killer (1994)
- The Final Cut (1995)
- Dream Man (1995)
- Malicious (1995)
- Crash (1996)
- White Tiger (1996)
- Underworld (1996)
- Wounded (1997)
- Air Bud (1997)
- Hoods (1998)
- Air Bud: Golden Receiver (1998)
- The 4th Floor (1999)
- Ricky 6 (2000)
- Here's to Life! (2000)
- Liberty Stands Still (2002)
- Dead Heat (2002)
- The Snow Walker (2003)
- Dreaming of Julia (2003)
- Saved! (2004)
- The Final Cut (2004)
- Make the Movie Live the Movie (2004)
- Bad Girls From Valley High (2005)
- Capote (2005)
- Ripley Under Ground (2005)
- Just Friends (2005)
- Butterfly on a Wheel (2007)
- Stone of Destiny (2008)
- Edison and Leo (2008)
- The Imaginarium of Doctor Parnassus (2009)
- Push (2009)
