= Air Buddies =

2006 film by Robert Vince

- DVD cover art
- Directed by: Robert Vince
- Written by: Anna McRoberts; Robert Vince; Phil Hanley
- Based on: Characters by Paul Tamasy; Aaron Mendelsohn; Kevin DiCicco
- Produced by: Anna McRoberts; Robert Vince
- Starring: Patrick Cranshaw; Holmes Osbourne; Slade Austin Pierce; Jane Carr; Paul Rae; Trevor Wright; Richard Karn; Cynthia Stevenson; Don Knotts; Josh Flitter; Abigail Breslin; Spencer Fox; Dominic Scott Kay; Skyler Gisondo; Tom Everett Scott; Molly Shannon; Wallace Shawn; Debra Jo Rupp; Michael Clarke Duncan
- Cinematography: Mike Southon
- Edited by: Kelly Herron; Jason Pielak
- Music by: Brahm Wenger
- Production companies: Keystone Family Pictures; Key Pix Productions
- Distributed by: Buena Vista Home Entertainment (Note: Under Walt Disney Home Entertainment imprint.)
- Release date: December 12, 2006
- Running time: 80 minutes
- Country: United States
- Language: English

Air Buddies is a 2006 American sports comedy film directed by Robert Vince. It is the sixth film in the Air Bud series and the first in the direct-to-video spin-off series Air Buddies, which follows the life of a lonely teenager and his dog who has the uncanny ability to play every sport.

The film changes the primary focus of the series from Buddy, an adult golden retriever, to his puppies. It also alters the character of the series by making virtually all of the animals speak.

Air Buddies was released by Buena Vista Home Entertainment on December 12, 2006.

== Plot ==
Sniffer introduces the five Air Buddies, describes their personalities and recaps how the puppies' father, Air Bud, made the town of Fernfield famous through his love of sports. When their families leave home for a basketball game, the puppies get into trouble with their sitter, Mrs. Niggles, by playing with balls of yarn and eating a blueberry pie. This prompts their owners to put the puppies up for adoption.

Meanwhile, Selkirk Tander tries to impress Mr. Livingstone's son Bartleby by showing him a tiger for his birthday, but Bartleby wants an animal he can play with. He wants Air Bud because Buddy can play sports. Livingstone offers $500,000 if Selkirk can get Buddy. Selkirk then sends his nephew Grim and assistant Denning to capture Buddy.

After deciding which children would make good owners, the family decides to call them the next day. Grim and Denning arrive at Buddy's home, only to see Buddy and Molly at the same time, thinking there are two Air Buds or they are mates. The next morning, the pups decide to run away. Grim and Denning follow them, and manage to catch Budderball by luring him with a donut. When the other Buddies go and find Budderball, they are also captured and used as bait to catch Buddy and Molly. Buddy manages to free the Buddies, but Denning traps him with a net. Molly attempts to save Buddy, but is captured. Denning and Grim put Buddy and Molly in the truck, while the buddies chase after them.

In wine country, Selkirk is pleased that Denning and Grim captured both Buddy and Molly so he can have them breed puppies and sell them for money. When Grim explains that Buddy and Molly already had puppies, which Denning let get away, Selkirk tells them to lock the dogs in the wine cellar and go and capture them. Selkirk also appoints Grim as the leader of the mission to capture the Buddies. Grim and Denning go back to Buddy's home to capture the Buddies but with no luck. The Buddies find their way to the projection room of a drive-in movie theater playing 101 Dalmatians and walk in front of the projector, but their shadows attract Denning and Grim's attention. The two are confronted by bikers who correctly believe their intentions of harming the Buddies, resulting in them being ambushed and tied up to the screen.

The next morning, Grim and Denning escape the theater and catch up to the Buddies, chasing them to a farm. The Buddies meet Billy the goat and Belinda the pig, who help them escape. The Buddies lure Grim and Denning into a stable and escape through a small hole as Billy locks Grim and Denning in. The Buddies go through the forest then meet the Wolf who leads them to wine country. A skunk's spray enables Sniffer to smell again, so he calls Noah and Henry, and they go off to find the Buddies. Buddy and Molly manag escape to find the Buddies. Budderball falls into a hole, which Buddy and Molly dug, forcing the Buddies to help. Noah and Henry are led by Sniffer through the same farm that the Buddies went through. Noah and Henry are ecstatic at finding Grim and Denning being held prisoners by Billy, and immediately leave to have them turned them in to authorities. Bartleby and his father come to collect the dogs but instead find the Buddies. Bartleby and his father then put the Buddies in a limousine as Noah, Henry, Buddy and Molly come to rescue the Buddies.

Noah, Henry, and the dogs release barrels towards Selkirk and Mr. Livingstone; the barrels slam into the wine containers and break them. Selkirk and Mr. Livingstone fall in, as the container cracks open. Sheriff Bob arrives to arrest Selkirk, along with Denning, and Grim. The Buddies apologize to Buddy and Molly and say they are ready for their new owners. Budderball decides to stay with Bartleby because he needs a friend. The puppies are introduced to their new families and end up enjoying their new lives.

== Cast ==
=== Live-action cast ===
- Patrick Cranshaw as Sheriff Bob
- Holmes Osbourne as Selkirk Tander, the villain of the film.
- Slade Austin Pearce as Noah Sullivan, Buddy's new owner, Jackie & Patrick's son and Josh & Andrea's younger maternal half-brother.
- Jane Carr as Mrs. Niggles
- Richard Karn as Dr. Patrick Sullivan, a local veterinarian, Jackie's husband, Noah's father and Josh & Andrea's stepfather.
- Cynthia Stevenson as Jackie Framm Sullivan, Patrick's wife and Josh, Andrea & Noah's mother.
- Paul Rae as Denning, Grim's assistant.
- Trevor Wright as Grim, Selkirk's foolish nephew.
- Christian Pikes as Henry, Noah's best friend and Molly's new owner.
- Tyler Guerrero as Bartleby Livingstone, Budderball's new owner.
- Gig Morton as Billy, B-Dawg's new owner.
- Jarvis Dashkewytch as Sam, Buddha's new owner.
- Cainan Wiebe as Pete Howard, Mudbud's new owner.
- Kelly Chapek as Alice Finch, Rosebud's new owner.
- Steven Makaj as Mr. Miles Livingstone, Bartleby's father.
- Karen Holness as Wilma, Henry's mother.
- Scout and Parker as Air Bud. Because of the demanding schedule, the role was played by more than one dog.

=== Voice cast ===
- Don Knotts as Deputy Sniffer, an old Bloodhound who lost his sense of smell years ago. He later regains it after getting sprayed by a skunk. He is one of the characters in the film who help the Buddies find their parents.
- Josh Flitter as Budderball, the chubbiest, biggest, and oldest of the Buddies. He enjoys food and wears eye black on his face to look like a football player. In addition to this, he also sports a red football T-shirt. When his paw is pulled, he farts, an allusion to "Pull my finger".
- Abigail Breslin as Rosebud, the lone girl, only sister, and youngest of the Buddies. She always wears a pink bow in her fur (usually her head) to separate herself from her brothers. She is protective of her brothers and her favorite color is pink.
- Spencer Fox as Mudbud, the dirt-loving dude of the Buddies. He wears a blue handkerchief around his neck.
- Dominic Scott Kay as Buddha, the peaceful Buddhist of the Buddies. He loves to meditate and wears a Buddhist collar made of beads. He is named for Gautama Buddha.
- Skyler Gisondo as B-Dawg, the rapping pup of the Buddies. He loves hip hop and wears a platinum chain with a 'B' as a pendant around his neck to look cool.
- Tom Everett Scott as Buddy, the father of the Buddies. He is still as fun-loving and athletic as he was before the Buddies were born. He belongs to Noah. After the events of the previous "Air Bud" films his former owners Josh and Andrea have grown up and moved out. This is the first time Buddy actually speaks.
- Molly Shannon as Molly, the mother of the Buddies. She loves her children and Buddy very much and will do anything to protect them. She belongs to Henry.
- Wallace Shawn as Billy, a Boer goat who the Buddies meet on the farm. He helps keep the Buddies out of Grim and Denning's clutches.
- Debra Jo Rupp as Belinda, a kind sow who the Buddies meet on the farm and speaks Pig Latin.
- Michael Clarke Duncan as the Wolf, a friendly inhabitant of the forest who helps the Buddies get to wine country.

B-Dawg is the pup who can play basketball, while Budderball plays football, Rosebud plays soccer, Buddha plays baseball, and Mudbud plays volleyball. All the animals can speak in this film. This was the first time speaking animals have appeared in the Air Bud series.

== Production ==
Principal photography took place in Vancouver, British Columbia, Canada in 2005.

During filming in Canada, Walt Disney Productions set-up supervision of animal treatment on set by American Humane's Certified Animal Safety Representatives. These representatives ensured all animals being worked with on the film received humane treatment internationally.

== Release ==
Air Buddies was released directly to DVD on December 12, 2006 by Buena Vista Home Entertainment, the same day as The Fox and the Hound 2.

Mill Creek Entertainment reissued the film on January 14, 2020 on a 2-disc boxset with other films in the series.
