= Buddy (dog actor) =

Dog actor (1988–1998)

- Species: Dog
- Breed: Golden Retriever
- Sex: Male
- Born: c. 1988; Sierra Nevada (found near June Lake, California), U.S.
- Died: February 10, 1998 (aged 9–10); San Diego, California, U.S.
- Occupation: Dog actor
- Years active: 1989–1998
- Owner: Kevin di Cicco

Buddy (c. 1988 – February 10, 1998) was a Golden Retriever dog actor. He was best known for playing the title role in the 1997 film Air Bud.

== Early life ==
Buddy was found by Kevin di Cicco as a stray dog in the Sierra Nevada in the summer of 1989. Di Cicco adopted the dishevelled Golden Retriever and brought him home to San Diego, California, where he trained the dog in the sports of basketball, baseball, football, soccer, and hockey. Buddy's most eagerly awaited sport was basketball. Di Cicco revealed that Buddy tried to bite the ball, but its slipperiness, enhanced by saliva or more efficiently by olive oil, would propel it from his mouth.

== Early appearances ==
His first appearance was on America's Funniest Home Videos. He then gained further fame bouncing a basketball off his muzzle and into a basketball hoop on the "Stupid Pet Tricks" segment of Late Night with David Letterman. Buddy appeared three times on Late Night and David Letterman's next show, Late Show with David Letterman.

== Film ==
He was cast as Buddy in the 1997 Disney film Air Bud, a film that tells the story of a golden retriever abandoned by his alcoholic abusive owner; in the film (which was Buddy's final acting role), he moved in with a boy named Josh Framm who was depressed after his father died in a plane crash.

He appeared on the Kids' Choice Awards in 1998, where he was nominated for a Blimp Award for the film. Prior to his death, Buddy sired nine puppies.

== Illness and death ==
In December 1996, towards the end of the filming for Air Bud, Buddy began to limp. In 1997, Buddy had his right hind leg amputated due to synovial cell sarcoma, a type of cancer that manifests near the joints, although he was still able to play basketball. Six months later, Buddy died in his sleep due to complications from cancer on February 10, 1998, at his owner's San Diego home. At the time of his death, Buddy was 9 years old.

Before Buddy's death, Di Cicco froze eleven vials of his semen. A few vials of Buddy's semen remains, and are stored at the International Canine Semen Bank. According to Di Cicco, Buddy has posthumously sired three litters of puppies.

== Di Cicco's death ==
Di Cicco died in San Diego on March 21, 2026, at the age of 63.

== Book ==
Buddy's story is told in the 2012 book Go Buddy!, written by his owner Kevin di Cicco.

== Awards and nominations ==
Year	Award	Category	Work	Status
1998	Kids' Choice Awards	Favorite Animal Star	Air Bud	Nominated

== Filmography ==
=== Film ===
- Air Bud – Buddy (1997)

=== Television ===
- America's Funniest Home Videos – Himself (1992)
- Late Night with David Letterman – Himself (1992)
- Late Show with David Letterman – Himself (1994)
- Full House – Comet (1 episode) (1995)
- Nickelodeon Kids' Choice Awards – Himself (1995, 1998)

== See also ==
- List of individual dogs
