= Mike Southon (cinematographer) =

British cinematographer

- Born: England, UK
- Occupation: Cinematographer

Mike Southon is a British cinematographer. He is a past President of the British Society of Cinematographers. As well as films, he has shot more than 250 music videos and 200 television commercials.

== Music videos (selection) ==
- 1992 November Rain [Guns N' Roses; directed by Andy Morahan]
