= Catwoman in other media =

Depictions of Catwoman outside of comics

Adaptations of Catwoman in other media
- Original source: Comics published by DC
- First appearance: Batman #1 (1940)

Films and television
- Film(s): Batman (1966); Batman Returns (1992); Catwoman (2004); Justice League: Crisis on Two Earths (2010); Batman: Year One (2011); DC Showcase: Catwoman (2011); The Dark Knight Rises (2012); Batman: The Dark Knight Returns: Part 2 (2013); Lego Batman: The Movie - DC Superheroes Unite (2013); Batman: Return of the Caped Crusaders (2016); DC Super Hero Girls: Hero of the Year (2016); The Lego Batman Movie (2017); Batman vs. Two-Face (2017); DC Super Hero Girls: Intergalactic Games (2017); Scooby-Doo! & Batman: The Brave and the Bold (2018); Batman: Gotham by Gaslight (2018); Batman Ninja (2018); Lego DC Super Hero Girls: Super-Villain High (2018); Batman Ninja (2018); DC Super Hero Girls: Legends of Atlantis (2018); Batman: Hush (2019); Batman: The Long Halloween (2021); Injustice (2021); Catwoman: Hunted (2022); The Batman (2022); Teen Titans Go! & DC Super Hero Girls: Mayhem in the Multiverse (2022); Aztec Batman: Clash of Empires (2025)
- Television show(s): Batman (1966); The Batman/Superman Hour (1968); The New Adventures of Batman (1977); Batman: The Animated Series (1992); The New Batman Adventures (1997); Batman Beyond (2000); Birds of Prey (2002); The Batman (2004); Robot Chicken (2005); Batman: The Brave and the Bold (2008); DC Nation Shorts (2011); Mad (2012); Gotham (2014); Teen Titans Go! (2017); DC Super Hero Girls (2019); Harley Quinn (2020); Batwheels (2022); Batman: Caped Crusader (2024)

Catwoman is a fictional character first appearing over 85 years ago in issue 1 of the Batman comic book. After her debut she would appear in many forms of media including live-action and animated film, radio, live-action and animated television, records, video games, web series, live performance, and podcasts. The character has made live-action appearances in the Batman television series (1966–68), its film adaptation Batman (1966), Batman Returns (1992), Catwoman (2004), The Dark Knight Rises (2012), Gotham (2014–19), and The Batman (2022). The character has also appeared in numerous animated television series and movies, most notably Batman: The Animated Series (1992–95) and The Lego Batman Movie (2017), as well as video games such as the Batman: Arkham series.

She has been portrayed in live action by Julie Newmar, Lee Meriwether, Eartha Kitt, Michelle Pfeiffer, Halle Berry, Anne Hathaway, Camren Bicondova, Lili Simmons and Zoë Kravitz, and has been voiced by Adrienne Barbeau, Grey DeLisle, Kravitz, Elizabeth Gillies, and numerous others.

== Television ==
=== Live-action ===
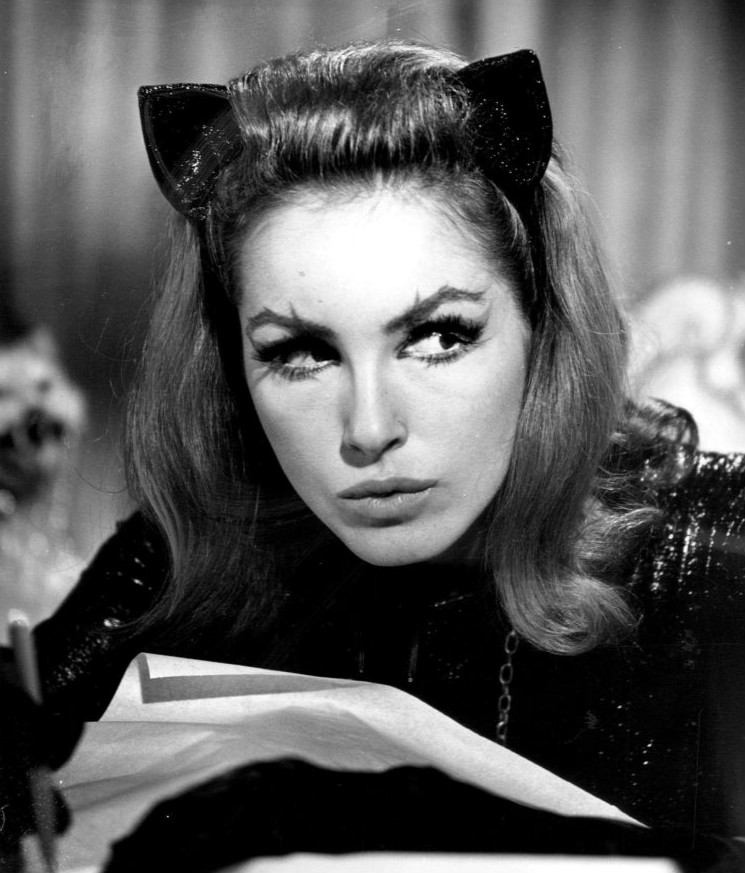
Catwoman (portrayed by Julie Newmar) as depicted in the first and second seasons of Batman (1966).

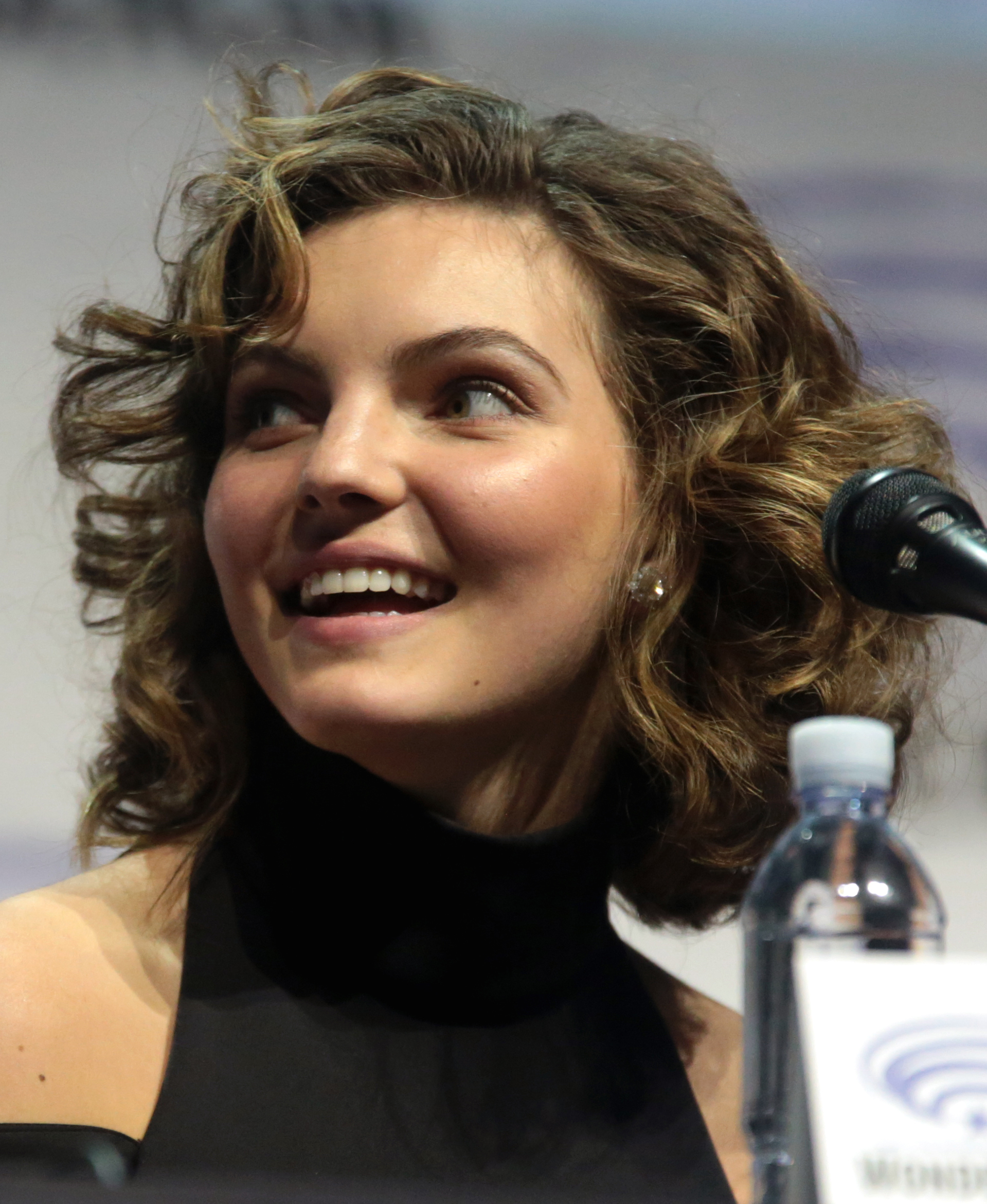
Camren Bicondova, who portrays a young Selina Kyle in Gotham

- Catwoman appears in Batman (1966), portrayed by Julie Newmar in the first and second seasons, Eartha Kitt in the third season, Lee Meriwether in the series' film adaptation (see below) and an uncredited body double in the episode "The Entrancing Dr. Cassandra". All three primary Catwomen are described by comic writer, Marc Andreyko, in an afterword to a Batman '66 Meets Wonder Woman '77 omnibus, as being akin to a "Darrin [Stevens]-in-Bewitched bit of silent recasting" and his colleague, co-writer Jeff Parker, liked how their story "leaves no one out and the readers got it immediately". In the TV series, Catwoman was given neither a background nor an alter ego. Instead, it focused on her costumed aspects. The costume created for the series was similar to the green catsuit that appeared in the comics at the time, though it was constructed by Newmar from black Lurex fabric. One of these costumes tailored for Newmar was later added to the Smithsonian Institution. Due to other commitments, Newmar was unavailable for the aforementioned film produced after the first season or for the series' third season.
- Catwoman appears in Birds of Prey, portrayed by Casey Elizabeth Easlick. This version is a metahuman with cat-like abilities and the mother of Huntress who was killed by Clayface years prior.
- A young Selina Kyle appears in Gotham, portrayed by Camren Bicondova as a teenager and Lili Simmons as an adult. This version is initially a 13-year-old thief and orphan who lives on Gotham City's streets and witnesses the murders of Thomas and Martha Wayne. After being saved from the Dollmaker's henchmen by GCPD Detective Jim Gordon, she forms a tenuous alliance with him, promising to help him solve the Waynes' murder in exchange for reducing her criminal record. In the meantime, Gordon arranges for her to stay at Wayne Manor, where she befriends the young Bruce Wayne. Throughout the rest of the series, Selina overcomes her insecurities and develops a love-hate relationship with Bruce while helping him keep order in Gotham City despite often butting heads with him due to her moral ambiguity. While she takes inspiration from previous Catwoman actresses Michelle Pfeiffer and Anne Hathaway, among others, Bicondova wanted to portray a side of Kyle not seen before, focusing on her past. As the series finale jumps ten years into the future from the rest of the series, Bicondova did not feel comfortable portraying her character as an adult, and at her request, an older actress was chosen to portray the adult Kyle. Warner Bros. Television cast Simmons in the role, with her and Bicondova collaborating closely on the adult Kyle's characterization.

=== Animation ===
Catwoman, as seen in The Batman.

- Catwoman was originally set to appear in the Challenge of the Superfriends as a member of the Legion of Doom. However, due to The New Adventures of Batman being in development at the time, Catwoman was unable to appear in the series and was eventually replaced with the Cheetah.
- Catwoman appears in The Batman/Superman Hour, voiced by Jane Webb. Similarly to the aforementioned Batman (1966) incarnation, this version wore her then-current green catsuit and heavy focus was placed on her costumed identity.
- Catwoman appears in The New Adventures of Batman, voiced by Melendy Britt.
- Catwoman appears in The Batman (2004), voiced by Gina Gershon. This version is a charity fundraiser in her civilian identity. Furthermore, her design is loosely based on the then-current costume used in the comic books, though with blue eyes instead of green.
- Catwoman, based on her Silver Age design, appears in Batman: The Brave and the Bold, voiced by Nika Futterman. This version is a founding member of the Birds of Prey.
- Catwoman appears in the Mad episode "The Superhero Millionaire Matchmaker", voiced by Grey DeLisle.
- Catwoman appears in the DC's World's Funnest segment of DC Nation Shorts, voiced by Emma Reynolds. Additionally, an alternate timeline variant appears in the "Batman of Shanghai" segment, voiced by Stephanie Sheh.
- Catwoman appears in Robot Chicken, voiced by Alex Borstein in the episode "The Deep End" and Clare Grant in Robot Chicken DC Comics Special 2: Villains in Paradise. Additionally, she makes non-speaking appearances in the Robot Chicken DC Comics Special and Robot Chicken DC Comics Special III: Magical Friendship. This version is a member of the Legion of Doom.
- Catwoman appears in DC Super Hero Girls (2015), voiced by Cristina Pucelli. This version is a student of Super Hero High.
- Catwoman appears in Teen Titans Go!. This version behaves more akin to a feline.
- Catwoman appears in DC Super Hero Girls (2019), voiced by Cree Summer. This version is an African-American student of Metropolis High and the leader of the Super Villain Girls.
- Catwoman appears in Harley Quinn, voiced primarily by Sanaa Lathan and by Cherise Boothe in the fifth season. This version is Poison Ivy's ex-girlfriend of African-American descent who is said to be the "best burglar in all of Gotham".
- Catwoman appears in Batwheels, voiced by Gina Rodriguez.
- Catwoman, based on her Silver Age design, appears in the Batman: Caped Crusader episode "Kiss of the Catwoman", voiced by Christina Ricci. This version was previously wealthy before her father was imprisoned for embezzlement and the family's businesses were seized. In response, she adopts the identity of Catwoman and turns to petty burglary to maintain her former lifestyle only to be defeated by Batman and arrested by the police. Selina is later informed by her former maid Greta that all of her remaining possessions have been sold as compensation for lost wages.

==== DC Animated Universe ====
Catwoman, as she appears in Batman: The Animated Series (left) and The New Batman Adventures (right)

Catwoman appears in series set in the DC Animated Universe (DCAU), voiced by Adrienne Barbeau.

- First appearing in Batman: The Animated Series (1992), her design took inspiration from Michelle Pfeiffer's portrayal, with long blonde hair in her civilian identity and a predominately gray catsuit with long black gloves and boots, causing her to resemble a seal-point Siamese cat. Furthermore, this series establishes Catwoman as a socialite and animal rights activist in addition to being a costumed thief in her early appearances and highlights her feelings towards Batman. Though she displays a crush on him, she tries to keep her distance from Batman and Bruce Wayne, who she previously dated.
- For The New Batman Adventures, Catwoman was redesigned to have an entirely black catsuit, light blue facial makeup, and short black hair.
- Catwoman appears in the short featurette "Chase Me".
- A spin-off focused on Catwoman was in production before being cancelled. Nonetheless, it was later reconsidered years later as a dual spin-off also focused on Nightwing.

== Film ==
=== Live-action ===
Actresses who have played Catwoman in live-action: (top) Julie Newmar, Lee Meriwether, Eartha Kitt, Michelle Pfeiffer (bottom) Halle Berry, Anne Hathaway, Camren Bicondova, and Zoe Kravitz.

Crew	Film				
Crew	Batman (1966)	Batman Returns (1992)	Catwoman (2004)	The Dark Knight Rises (2012)	The Batman (2022)
Catwoman portrayer	Lee Meriwether	Michelle Pfeiffer	Halle Berry	Anne Hathaway	Zoë Kravitz
Director	Leslie H. Martinson	Tim Burton	Pitof	Christopher Nolan	Matt Reeves
Producer	William Dozier	Denise Di Novi; Tim Burton	Denise Di Novi; Edward L. McDonnell	Emma Thomas; Christopher Nolan; Charles Roven	Matt Reeves; Dylan Clark
Writer	Lorenzo Semple Jr.	Screenplay by: Daniel Waters Story by: Daniel Waters and Sam Hamm	Screenplay by: John Brancato & Michael Ferris and John Rogers Story by: Theresa Rebeck, John Brancato and Michael Ferris	Screenplay by: Jonathan Nolan and Christopher Nolan Story by: Christopher Nolan and David S. Goyer	Matt Reeves; Peter Craig
Composer	Nelson Riddle	Danny Elfman	Klaus Badelt	Hans Zimmer	Michael Giacchino
Cinematography	Howard Schwartz	Stefan Czapsky	Thierry Arbogast	Wally Pfister	Greig Fraser
Editor	Harry Gerstad	Chris Lebenzon	Sylvie Landra	Lee Smith	William Hoy
Production Companies	William Dozier Productions; Greenlawn Productions	Warner Bros. PolyGram Films	Village Roadshow Pictures; Di Novi Pictures	Legendary Pictures; Syncopy Films	DC Films; 6th & Idaho; Dylan Clark Productions
Distributor	20th Century Fox	Warner Bros. Pictures	Warner Bros. Pictures	Warner Bros. Pictures	Warner Bros. Pictures
Released	July 30, 1966	June 19, 1992	July 23, 2004	July 20, 2012	March 4, 2022
Runtime	104 minutes	126 minutes	104 minutes	165 minutes	176 minutes

Catwoman (portrayed by Lee Meriwether) as depicted in Batman (1966)

Catwoman (portrayed by Michelle Pfeiffer) as depicted in Batman Returns

Patience Phillips / Catwoman (portrayed by Halle Berry as depicted in her self-titled film

Catwoman (portrayed by Anne Hathaway) as depicted in The Dark Knight Rises

Catwoman (portrayed by Zoë Kravitz) as depicted in The Batman (2022)

- Catwoman appears in the movie Batman, portrayed by Lee Meriwether. Following production of the series' first season, Julie Newmar was intended to reprise the role until the producers learned she would be unavailable due to prior commitments. This version is based on the TV show Batman (1966).
- Selina Kyle / Catwoman appears in Batman Returns (1992), portrayed by Michelle Pfeiffer. For her design, screenwriter Daniel Waters took inspiration from Kyle's appearance in Catwoman: Her Sister's Keeper while her characterization drew on her pre-Crisis interpretation. Prior to Pfeiffer's casting, Madonna, Jennifer Beals, Lorraine Bracco and Demi Moore were linked to the role, with Madonna in particular as the frontrunner, while Sean Young campaigned heavily to take on the role. When it was suggested to director Tim Burton that Pfeiffer was interested, the producers thought "She's perfect. She also could be both Selina Kyle and Catwoman." This version of Kyle is the mousy, lonely, and frustrated secretary of corrupt tycoon Max Shreck. After inadvertently stumbling onto his plot to steal Gotham City's electricity, he attempts to murder her. However, she is mysteriously revived by a group of cats. Returning home, she suffers a psychotic break and reinvents herself as the seductive and deadly Catwoman. While seeking revenge on Shreck, she allies herself with the Penguin, comes into conflict with Batman, and enters a brief relationship with Bruce Wayne, initially unaware that he is Batman. Eventually, she succeeds in killing Shreck, during which she is presumed dead as well. However, her body disappears while a figure wearing her suit later surfaces.
- Following Batman Returns, Burton stated that he had no interest in returning to direct a sequel, but he stayed on as a producer. With Warner Bros. moving on development for Batman Forever in June 1993, a Catwoman spin-off film was announced, with Pfeiffer intended to reprise her role in the latter film instead of Forever. Burton was attached to direct the spin-off while producer Denise Di Novi and writer Daniel Waters also returned. In January 1994, Burton became unsure of his plans to direct Catwoman or an adaptation of "The Fall of the House of Usher". On June 16, 1995, Waters turned in his Catwoman script to Warner Bros., the same day that Batman Forever was released. Burton was still being courted to direct. Waters joked, "Turning it in the day Batman Forever opened may not have been my best logistical move, in that it's the celebration of the fun-for-the-whole-family Batman. Catwoman is definitely not a fun-for-the-whole-family script." In an August 1995 interview, Pfeiffer re-iterated her interest in the spin-off, but explained her priorities would be challenged as a mother and commitments to other projects. The film labored in development hell for years, with Pfeiffer later being replaced by Ashley Judd. The film ended up becoming Catwoman (see below).
- In 2000, Warner Bros. commissioned Darren Aronofsky for an adaptation of Batman: Year One to reboot the original Batman film franchise. The script featured an African-American Selina Kyle / Catwoman in a prominent role. However, no further progress was made.
- A young Julie Newmar as Catwoman appears in Return to the Batcave: The Misadventures of Adam and Burt, portrayed by Julia Rose. Additionally, Newmar herself and Meriwether appear as well.
- An original incarnation of Catwoman named Patience Phillips appears in a self-titled film, portrayed by Halle Berry. She is a graphic designer working for a cosmetics company called Hedare Beauty. After she learns their anti-aging skin cream, Beau-Line, has deadly side effects, the company's CEO's wife Laurel Hedare orders Patience to be killed. However, she is mysteriously revived by Midnight, an Egyptian Mau, and granted cat-like abilities. Donning a mask to protect her identity, Patience becomes Catwoman to seek revenge. This eventually leads her to Laurel, who murders her husband and attempts to frame Patience for it, only to later fall to her death. In addition to Patience, other Catwomen are alluded to, such as Pfeiffer's incarnation. The film was poorly received by critics and audiences and is commonly listed as one of the worst films ever made.
- Selina Kyle appears in The Dark Knight Rises, portrayed by Anne Hathaway. Entertainment Weekly describes Hathaway's portrayal as an enigmatic, wily, and witty con artist, as well as a high society grifter. Moreover, Hathaway believed that she was auditioning for Harley Quinn. Prior to Hathaway's casting, Natalie Portman, Eva Green, Keira Knightley, Kate Mara, Gemma Arterton, Blake Lively, and Lady Gaga were considered for the role.
- Zack Snyder, director of Batman v Superman: Dawn of Justice, wanted Carla Gugino to portray Selina Kyle / Catwoman. The scene was going to be a flashback to ten years prior, wherein she and Batman reunite following a previous encounter. Eliza Dushku, who voiced Catwoman in other DC projects, was also considered to portray Catwoman.
- Prior to the announcement that Michael Keaton would be reprising his role as Batman in The Flash, Pfeiffer previously stated a willingness and enthusiasm to reprise her own role as Catwoman. In a 2021 interview with Screen Rant, she stated that she would have been interested in doing so, but she would not be appearing in the film.
- Selina Kyle / Catwoman appears in The Batman (2022), portrayed by Zoë Kravitz. Prior to Kravitz's casting, Zazie Beetz, Alicia Vikander, Ana de Armas, Ella Balinska, and Eiza Gonzalez also auditioned for the role. This version is the daughter of Carmine Falcone and a woman named Maria who works for him as a waitress at the Iceberg Lounge nightclub alongside her roommate Annika Koslov while moonlighting as a cat burglar.

=== Animation ===
- Around 2003, during the production of Batman: Mystery of the Batwoman, Warner Bros. approached Boyd Kirkland to write a Catwoman direct-to-video feature film as a tie-in with the character's self-titled film. Though the script was written, the project was soon scrapped following the latter film's poor reception.
- After the release of Batman Beyond: Return of the Joker, a second film with Catwoman as a main character was planned, but ultimately scrapped.
- An alternate universe variant of Catwoman, amalgamated with Man-Bat, called She-Bat makes a cameo appearance in Justice League: Crisis on Two Earths as a minor member of the Crime Syndicate.
- Catwoman appears in Batman: Year One, voiced by Eliza Dushku.
- Catwoman appears in DC Showcase: Catwoman, voiced again by Eliza Dushku.
- Catwoman appears in Lego Batman: The Movie - DC Superheroes Unite, voiced by Katherine Von Till.
- Selina Kyle appears in Batman: The Dark Knight Returns, voiced by Tress MacNeille.
- The Batman (1966) incarnation of Catwoman appears in Batman: Return of the Caped Crusaders and Batman vs. Two-Face, voiced by Julie Newmar. Additionally, Lee Meriwether voices a character named Lucilee Diamond.
- Catwoman appears in The Lego Batman Movie, voiced by Zoë Kravitz.
- Catwoman appears in Scooby-Doo! & Batman: The Brave and the Bold, voiced again by Nika Futterman.
- Catwoman appears in Lego DC Super Hero Girls: Super-Villain High, voiced again by Cristina Pucelli.
- An alternate universe variant of Selina Kyle appears in Batman: Gotham by Gaslight, voiced by Jennifer Carpenter while Grey Griffin provides her singing voice.
- A Feudal Japan-inspired incarnation of Catwoman appears in Batman Ninja, voiced by Ai Kakuma in Japanese and Grey Griffin in English.
- Catwoman appears in Batman: Hush, voiced by Jennifer Morrison.
- Catwoman appears in Batman: The Long Halloween, voiced posthumously by Naya Rivera.
- Catwoman appears in Injustice, voiced by Anika Noni Rose.
- Catwoman appears in Catwoman: Hunted, voiced by Elizabeth Gillies.
- A character based on Catwoman called Jaguar Woman appears in Aztec Batman: Clash of Empires, voiced by Teresa Ruiz in Spanish and Brigitte Kali Canales in English.

== Video games ==
- Catwoman, based on Michelle Pfeiffer's portrayal, appears as a boss in Batman Returns (1993).
- Catwoman, based on the DCAU incarnation, appears as a boss in Batman: The Animated Series (1993).
- Catwoman, based on the DCAU incarnation, appears in the Super NES version of The Adventures of Batman & Robin.
- Catwoman appears in a self-titled video game for the Game Boy Color (1999).
- The Patience Phillips incarnation of Catwoman appears in the self-titled film tie-in game (2004), voiced by Jennifer Hale.
- Catwoman appears as a playable character in Mortal Kombat vs. DC Universe, voiced by Patty Mattson.
- Catwoman appears in Batman: The Brave and the Bold – The Videogame, voiced again by Nika Futterman.
- Catwoman appears in DC Universe Online, voiced by Kelley Huston. This version is a member of the Secret Society.
- Catwoman, based on Anne Hathaway's portrayal, appears in The Dark Knight Rises tie-in game, voiced by Alyson Morgan.
- Catwoman appears as a playable character in Infinite Crisis, voiced again by Grey DeLisle.
- Catwoman appears in the mobile game DC Legends.
- Catwoman appears in DC Battle Arena, voiced by Kimlinh Tran.
- Catwoman appears in DC Super Hero Girls: Teen Power, voiced again by Cree Summer.
- Catwoman appears as a character summon in Scribblenauts Unmasked: A DC Comics Adventure.
- Catwoman appears as a playable character in Injustice: Gods Among Us, voiced again by Grey DeLisle. Additionally, an alternate reality variant who previously worked with Batman's Insurgency before defecting to Superman's Regime appears as well. Furthermore, her mainstream and Batman: Arkham City designs appear as alternate skins.
- Catwoman appears in Batman: The Telltale Series, voiced by Laura Bailey.
- The Injustice incarnation of Catwoman appears as a playable character in Injustice 2, voiced again by Grey DeLisle. By this time, she has rejoined the Insurgency and initially operates as a double agent within Gorilla Grodd's Society.
- Catwoman appears as a playable character in SINoALICE, voiced again by Ai Kakuma.
- Catwoman appears in Batman: The Enemy Within, voiced again by Laura Bailey. While working to sabotage a supervillain group called the Pact, she eventually ends up captured by the Agency and forced to take part in their supervillain program.
- Catwoman appears as an alternate skin for Kitana in Mortal Kombat 11 via the "DC Elseworld" DLC pack.

=== Lego ===
- Catwoman appears as a boss and playable character in Lego Batman: The Video Game, voiced by Vanessa Marshall. This version is a deputy of the Penguin.
- Catwoman appears in Lego Batman 2: DC Super Heroes, voiced by Katherine Von Till.
- Catwoman appears as a playable character in Lego Batman 3: Beyond Gotham, voiced by Laura Bailey. This version's appearance is primarily based on that of her New 52 incarnation, with the Batman (1966) and pre-New 52 designs appearing as alternate skins. Furthermore, the Batman (1966) incarnation appears as a miniboss while The Dark Knight Rises incarnation appears as a downloadable playable character.
- The Lego Batman Movie incarnation of Catwoman makes a cameo appearance in Lego Dimensions, voiced again by Grey Griffin.
- Catwoman appears in Lego DC Super-Villains, voiced again by Grey Griffin. This version is a member of the Legion of Doom.
- Catwoman appears as a playable character in Lego Batman: Legacy of the Dark Knight, voiced by Clara Emanuel. This version's appearance is primarily based on that of her Batman Returns and The Batman incarnations, but she does have unlockable costumes highlighting her other media appearances in film and television.

=== Batman: Arkham ===
Catwoman appears in the Batman: Arkham franchise, voiced by Grey DeLisle.

- A bio for Catwoman along with parts of her costume appear in Batman: Arkham Asylum.
- Catwoman appears in Batman: Arkham City, where she is playable for the first time in the series.
- A young Catwoman appears in Batman: Arkham Origins Blackgate.
- Catwoman appears as a playable character in Batman: Arkham Knight.
- Catwoman appears in Batman: Arkham Underworld.
- Selina Kyle appears in Batman: Arkham Shadow, voiced by Chantelle Barry.

== Miscellaneous ==
- Starting with the Pop Art period and on a continuing basis since the 1960s, Catwoman has been "appropriated" by multiple visual artists and incorporated into contemporary artwork, most notably by Andy Warhol, Roy Lichtenstein, Mel Ramos, Dulce Pinzon, and F. Lennox Campello, among others.
- Catwoman appears in the audio book Batman and Robin in the Case of the Laughing Sphynx, voiced by Christina Frith.
- Catwoman, based on Michelle Pfeiffer's portrayal, appears in Batman '89, written by Sam Hamm and illustrated by Joe Quinones.
- Catwoman serves as inspiration for The Fox, who appears in Mark Millar's Wanted, Nemesis Reloaded, and Big Game, with her face in the first series being modelled after Halle Berry prior to her portraying the titular role in Catwoman (2004).
  - The Fox appears in the Wanted film adaptation, portrayed by Angelina Jolie.
- Catwoman appears in Batman: The Lazarus Syndrome, voiced by Lorelei King.
- Catwoman appears in the Batman Black and White motion comic, voiced by Janyse Jaud.
- The Injustice incarnation of Catwoman appears in the Injustice: Gods Among Us and Injustice 2 prequel comics, in which she helped co-found the Insurgency alongside Batman and supports the group for five years before defecting to the Regime after losing hope that Superman could be stopped. Following Superman's defeat, she returns to the Insurgency and agrees to serve as a mole within Gorilla Grodd's Society.
- Catwoman appears in Batman: The Audio Adventures (2021), voiced by Rosario Dawson.
- The Batman Returns incarnation of Selina Kyle appears in Batman: Resurrection (2024).

== Actresses ==
- "V" indicates a voice-only role. "V†" indicates a posthumous voice-only appearance.
- "P" indicates a photo-only cameo appearance.

Actor	Live-action film	Animated film	Live-action television	Animated television	Web series	Video games	Podcasts	Radio	Audio records	Live performance	
Actor	Lee Meriwether	1966	2016^{V}								
Actor	Julie Newmar		2016, 2017^{V}	1966–1967			2016^{V}				
Actor	Eartha Kitt		2016^{V†}	1967–1968							
Actor	Jane Webb				1968–1969^{V}						
Actor	Unknown									1975, 1975^{V}	
Actor	Melendy Britt				1977^{V}						
Actor	Christina Frith									1982^{V}	
Actor	Lorelei King								1989, 1994^{V}		
Actor	Michelle Pfeiffer	1992, 2004^{P}									
Actor	Adrienne Barbeau		2003^{V}		1992–1995, 1997–1998, 2000^{V}	2000–2002^{V}					
Actor	Casey Elizabeth Easlick			2002–2003							
Actor	Halle Berry	2004									
Actor	Jennifer Hale						2004^{V}				
Actor	Gina Gershon				2004–2007^{V}						
Actor	Alex Borstein				2005^{V}						
Actor	Janyse Jaud					2008^{V}					
Actor	Patty Mattson						2008^{V}				
Actor	Vanessa Marshall						2008^{V}				
Actor	Nika Futterman		2018^{V}		2009–2011^{V}		2010^{V}				
Actor	Eliza Dushku		2011^{V}								
Actor	Emma Clifford										2011, 2012
Actor	Emma Reynolds				2011–2013^{V}						
Actor	Grey DeLisle		2018^{V}		2012^{V}		2011, 2013, 2013, 2015, 2015, 2015, 2016, 2016, 2017, 2018^{V}				
Actor	Cree Summer		2011, 2022^{V}		2019–2021^{V}	2019, 2020–2024^{V}	2021^{V}				
Actor	Anne Hathaway	2012									
Actor	Alyson Morgan						2012^{V}				
Actor	Samantha Barks				2012^{V}						
Actor	Katherine Von Till		2013^{V}				2012^{V}				
Actor	Valerie Michelle Arem						2013^{V}				
Tress MacNeille		2013^{V}									
Stephanie Sheh				2013^{V}							
Clare Grant				2014^{V}							
Camren Bicondova			2014–2019		2016^{V}						
Laura Bailey					2017–2018^{V}	2014, 2016^{V}					
Cristina Pucelli		2018^{V}			2015–2018^{V}						
Zoë Kravitz	2022	2017^{V}									
Katie Crown				2017–2022^{V}							
Jennifer Carpenter		2018^{V}									
Ai Kakuma		2018^{V}				2020^{V}					
Jennifer Morrison		2019^{V}									
Lili Simmons			2019								
Sanaa Lathan				2020–2023^{V}							
Anika Noni Rose		2021^{V}									
Naya Rivera		2021^{V†}									
Kimlinh Tran						2021^{V}					
Rosario Dawson							2021–2022^{V}				
Elizabeth Gillies		2022^{V}									
Gina Rodriguez				2022–2025^{V}							
Chantelle Barry						2024^{V}					
Christina Ricci				2024–2025^{V}							
Cherise Boothe				2025^{V}							
Teresa Ruiz		2025^{V}									
Brigitte Kali Canales		2025^{V}									

== Links ==
- From Comic to Pfeiffer's Cat Batman-Online.com's in-depth analysis on Tim Burton's Catwoman comic origins
