= It's a Good Life =

- Short story by Jerome Bixby
- Country: United States
- Genres: Horror, science fiction

Publication
- Published in: Star Science Fiction Stories No.2
- Publication type: Anthology
- Publisher: Ballantine Books
- Media type: Print (Paperback)
- Publication date: 1953

"It's a Good Life" is a short story by American writer Jerome Bixby, written in 1953. In 1970, the Science Fiction Writers of America selected it for The Science Fiction Hall of Fame, Volume One, as one of the 20 best short stories in science fiction published prior to the Nebula Award. The story was first published in Star Science Fiction Stories No.2. The story was adapted in 1961 into an episode of The Twilight Zone.

== Plot summary ==
Anthony Fremont is a three-year-old boy with near-godlike powers: He can transform other people, animals or objects into anything he wishes, think new things into being, teleport himself and others where he wishes, read the minds of people and animals and even revive the dead. His appearance is never completely described; the story mentions his "odd shadow" and "bright, wet, purple gaze", and the obstetrician at his birth was said to have "screamed and dropped him and tried to kill him". The town's children are told that Anthony is a "nice goblin", but they must never go near him.

Anthony's powers were present at birth, as he was able to kill the obstetrician and then, instinctively, separate his birthplace, the town of Peaksville, Ohio, from the rest of Earth moments after he was born. Nobody knows whether Anthony transported Peaksville somewhere or whether the rest of the world was destroyed and only the town remains.

There is no electricity, and the residents have to make their own things and grow their own food; the latter is somewhat difficult, as Anthony changes the weather according to his whims. The adults must satisfy Anthony's every whim, or risk displeasing him. Nobody is safe from Anthony, not even his own family, although they can sometimes influence him slightly; after a "smiling" suggestion from his father, Anthony sends the remains of his victims into graves in the family cornfield, after he has finished with them.

Because Anthony can read minds, the residents of the town must appear content in his presence and believe themselves to be happy. Although he possesses god-like powers, Anthony is portrayed as a three-year-old child with a limited understanding of the world rather than as deliberately malicious. His attempts to help others can nevertheless produce unintended and harmful consequences. As a result, the townspeople generally avoid expressing dissatisfaction with their circumstances, fearing that any changes Anthony makes could have worse consequences. Those who incur his displeasure can also suffer serious consequences, while others are reluctant to ask him to reverse his actions because doing so may lead to further unintended effects.

The story mostly takes place during a surprise birthday party for the Fremonts' neighbor, Dan Hollis. The party guests take turns presenting Dan with gifts of items that were found within the town, since they cannot acquire anything new from the outside world. Dan receives a newly discovered Perry Como record for his birthday and wants to play it right away, but as Anthony does not like singing, the others advise him to wait until he gets home. Dan gets drunk and starts singing, first "Happy Birthday" to himself, and then "You Are My Sunshine". Angrily, he turns on Anthony's parents, crying, "You had to go and have him", then he defiantly continues to sing as Anthony appears in the room. Anthony declares that Dan is a "bad man" and turns him into something horrific, "something like nothing anyone would have believed possible", before "thinking" him deep into the cornfield.

Because Anthony's Aunt Amy carelessly complained about the heat earlier, the next day Anthony makes it snow, which "killed off half the crops—but it was a good day".

== Reception ==
Floyd C. Gale in 1961 called the story a "super-duper topnotcher". In 1986, it was included in the anthology Isaac Asimov Presents The Great SF Stories 15 as one of the best science fiction short stories of 1953. Theodore Sturgeon's "Talent" was published in the September 1953 issue of Beyond Fantasy Fiction. The story features the same omnipotent child monster concept.

In 2004, the story was a finalist for the 1954 Retro-Hugo Award for Best Short Story.

== Adaptations ==
- "It's a Good Life" (The Twilight Zone), a 1961 episode of the 1959 TV series
- "It's a Good Life", the third segment of Twilight Zone: The Movie (1983), is a reimagining of the 1961 TV episode. In this version, Anthony (no last name given) is depicted as eight (he is three in the original story and six in the original episode). He uses his powers to cater to himself and his "family", who are revealed to be random people that he has manipulated and held against their will. Anthony's real sister is crippled and has no mouth because she made Anthony mad. His real parents wanted to "send Anthony away" and are now simply gone. This depiction of Anthony is a much more sympathetic and tragic character who only wants people not to fear him. He is portrayed as loving cartoons, making them the only thing anybody watches, with televisions in every room. According to Anthony, "anything can happen in cartoons" and he himself "can do anything. Anything!"
- "Treehouse of Horror II", the seventh episode of the third season of The Simpsons. The second segment is a parody of the original Twilight Zone episode, with Bart in the role of Anthony.
- "It's Still a Good Life", the 31st episode of The Twilight Zone (2002 TV series) which acts as a sequel to the episode in the 1959 TV series, with Bill Mumy and Cloris Leachman reprising roles from the original episode.
- "Johnny Real Good", from the 12th episode of the first season of Johnny Bravo which stands more as a parody of the Twilight Zone episode. Johnny must babysit a boy with god-like powers who constantly teleports him into a nearby cornfield for thinking bad thoughts.

== See also ==
- The Science Fiction Hall of Fame, Volume One, 1929–1964, an anthology of the greatest science fiction short stories prior to 1965, as judged by the Science Fiction Writers of America.
