= Space Buddies =

- DVD cover art
- Directed by: Robert Vince
- Written by: Robert Vince; Anna McRoberts
- Based on: Characters by Paul Tamasy; Aaron Mendelsohn; Kevin DiCicco; Robert Vince; Anna McRoberts
- Produced by: Robert Vince; Anna McRoberts
- Starring: Bill Fagerbakke; Kevin Weisman; Lochlyn Munro; Ali Hillis; Pat Finn; Nolan Gould; Wayne Wilderson; Diedrich Bader; Jason Earles; Field Cate; Liliana Mumy; Josh Flitter; Skyler Gisondo; Henry Hodges; Amy Sedaris
- Cinematography: Kamal Derkaoui
- Edited by: Kelly Herron
- Music by: Brahm Wenger; Gregory Prechel (composer, orchestrator, additional music)
- Production companies: Keystone Entertainment; Key Pix Productions
- Distributed by: Walt Disney Studios Home Entertainment (Note: Released through the Walt Disney Pictures banner.)
- Release date: February 3, 2009
- Running time: 84 minutes
- Country: United States
- Language: English

Space Buddies is a 2009 American science fiction comedy film. It is the third film in the Air Buddies franchise. It was released by Walt Disney Studios Home Entertainment on February 3, 2009. Like Air Buddies and Snow Buddies, it was released directly on DVD and became the first one to be released on Blu-ray.

== Plot ==
The film starts with Buddha and his owner, Sam, stargazing. As a shooting star passes, Sam makes a wish that he can touch the Moon. The next day is the day of his school field trip to Vision Enterprises to watch a test launch of the Vision 1 spacecraft. The pets, however, are not allowed to go, and he has to leave Buddha at home. Buddha meets up with his siblings – Rosebud, Budderball, B-Dawg, and Mudbud – and invites them to come with him to go to see the test launch. They decide to hide in the school bus which soon arrives at the Vision Enterprises, and the dogs go to a space suit machine and put on space suits before following the students, who are being led by Dr. Finkel. The dogs get aboard the Space Shuttle Vision 1. At Mission Control in the Vision Enterprises, Pi confirms they are ready for launch. Meanwhile, the dogs take a close look around until they are sealed in the shuttle, which prepares for launch. Astro, who pilots the shuttle from Earth, launches the shuttle, and it flies to space.

At Mission Control, the humans realize the third tank of gas in the shuttle was never filled. With ten hours until the gas runs out, they look for solutions. They eventually decide to pilot the spacecraft to the old R.R.S.S. (Russian Research Space Station). They contact the cosmonaut living in the space station, named Yuri, telling him to refuel the Vision 1. As Vision 1 connects to the space station, the dogs decide to explore the space station, and they meet a dog called Spudnick who is under the care of Yuri. Spudnick explains that Yuri is quite content to stay in space, yet he wishes to go home. Yuri finds the dogs and becomes happy because the buddies can keep them company, so he traps the buddies in the kitchen, and they are saved later by Spudnick. After Yuri connects the fuel hose to the Vision 1, the fuel starts to leak from the hose. Meanwhile, the buddies and Spudnick rush back to Vision 1 to escape. Yuri activates lockdown to trap the dogs, but they manage to get to the Vision 1. Yuri tries to stop them, banging on the control switches, but sparks drop on the fuel, causing an explosion. The dogs escape from the R.R.S.S. as it explodes. Yuri barely escapes using the Cosmopod escape vessel.

Vision 1 travels to the Moon. Soon after, the Vision 1 approaches and lands on the Moon. They soon begin to get out of the Vision 1 and walk around the area within the place they had landed. Mission Control finds that the sounds from their helmets happen to be soft barks, and conclude they are golden retriever puppies, and this is broadcast on the news and the children find out through it. The dogs, while on the Moon, meet a ferret named Gravity who is their mission control assistant, but since their only communication is from audio, they don't know she is a ferret. She orders them to get back on the Vision 1.

When returning to Earth, the path is changed by an unworthy Dr. Finkel. The path's telemetry is reverted into a meteor shower. The "auto-avoidance system" takes control of the Vision 1, rotating and shifting heavily between every meteor in its path, but the Vision 1's data communications antenna is busted when it becomes struck by a meteor. Budderball is sent to repair the antenna by doing a space walk outside of the Vision 1. At Mission Control, the adults are puzzled about the change of the telemetry course of the Vision 1 when Sam accuses Dr. Finkel of changing the path. As Dr. Finkel denies it, Pi uses the security camera to confirm that he was indeed at the desk at 7:49 pm, the time when the telemetry course was changed. As Dr. Finkel is taken away by security, Sam approaches Dr. him and calls him "Dr. Stinkel".

The Mission Control center receives Yuri's distress signal in the Cosmopod before the Vision 1 enters the atmosphere through the blackout zone. They wait 4 minutes until they arrive, but they arrive early. Vision 1 ends its mission by slowing down on the takeoff strip. The dogs find out Gravity is a ferret. Yuri crashes his pod, and is rescued by some soldiers, telling them he comes from space.

Pi awards the dogs wings of true heroism, with their title as "Space Buddies". Once at home, Buddha gives Sam a Moon rock he had taken from his journey, fulfilling his wish of touching the Moon. The film ends with Spudnick back at home with his old owner, Sasha, who says that "it is the journey and friendship that matters the most".

== Cast ==
=== Live-action cast ===
- Bill Fagerbakke as Pi
- Kevin Weisman as Dr. Finkel
- Lochlyn Munro as Slats Bentley
- Ali Hillis as Astro Spalding, pilot of spaceship
- Diedrich Bader as Yuri
- Pat Finn as Bill Wolfson
- Nolan Gould as Sam, Buddha's owner
- Wayne Wilderson as Tad Thompson
- Nico Ghisi as Bartleby Livingstone, Budderball's owner
- Gig Morton as Billy, B-Dawg's owner
- Quinn Lord as Pete Howard, Mudbud's owner
- Sophia Ludwig as Alice Finch, Rosebud's owner
- Reese Schoeppe as Sasha, Spudnick's owner
- C. Ernst Harth as Guard at the gate to HQ
- John Czech as Brazil
- Michael Teigen as Sheriff Dan
- Chris Gauthier as Tad's Cameraman

=== Voice cast ===
- Jason Earles as Spudnick, a Bull Terrier
- Field Cate as Buddha
- Liliana Mumy as Rosebud
- Josh Flitter as Budderball
- Skyler Gisondo as B-Dawg
- Henry Hodges as Mudbud
- Amy Sedaris as Gravity, a ferret

== Home media ==
The film was released on DVD and Blu-ray February 3, 2009.
