= It's a Good Life (The Twilight Zone) =

- The Twilight Zone episode
- Episode no.: Season 3 Episode 8
- Directed by: James Sheldon
- Teleplay by: Rod Serling
- Based on: "It's a Good Life" by Jerome Bixby
- Production code: 4801
- Original air date: November 3, 1961

Guest appearances
- John Larch as Mr. Fremont; Cloris Leachman as Mrs. Fremont; Don Keefer as Dan Hollis; Billy Mumy as Anthony Fremont; Alice Frost as Aunt Amy; Max Showalter (as Casey Adams) as Pat Riley; Jeanne Bates as Ethel Hollis

Episode chronology
| ← Previous "The Grave" | Next → "Deaths-Head Revisited" |
- The Twilight Zone (1959 TV series) season 3

"It's a Good Life" is the eighth episode of the third season of the American television series The Twilight Zone, and the 73rd overall. It was written by series creator/showrunner Rod Serling, based on the 1953 short story "It's a Good Life" by Jerome Bixby. The episode was directed by James Sheldon, and is considered by some, such as critics in Time and TV Guide, to be one of the best episodes of the series. It originally aired on November 3, 1961. The episode was one of four from the original 1959 series which formed the basis of the 1983 film Twilight Zone: The Movie.

== Opening narration ==
Tonight's story on The Twilight Zone is somewhat unique and calls for a different kind of introduction. This, as you may recognize, is a map of the United States, and there's a little town there called Peaksville. On a given morning not too long ago, the rest of the world disappeared, and Peaksville was left all alone. Its inhabitants were never sure whether the world was destroyed and only Peaksville was left untouched, or whether the village had somehow been taken away. They were, on the other hand, sure of one thing—the cause. A monster had arrived in the village. Just by using his mind, he took away the automobiles, the electricity, the machines, because they displeased him. And he moved an entire community back into the Dark Ages, just by using his mind. Now I'd like to introduce you to some of the people in Peaksville, Ohio. This is Mr. Fremont. It's in his farmhouse that the monster resides. This is Mrs. Fremont. And this is Aunt Amy, who probably had more control over the monster in the beginning than almost anyone. But one day she forgot. She began to sing aloud. Now the monster doesn't like singing, so his mind snapped at her, and turned her into the smiling vacant thing you're looking at now. She sings no more. And you'll note that the people in Peaksville, Ohio, have to smile. They have to think happy thoughts and say happy things because, once displeased, the monster can wish them into a cornfield, or change them into a grotesque walking horror. This particular monster can read minds, you see. He knows every thought, he can feel every emotion. Oh, yes, I did forget something, didn't I? I forgot to introduce you to the monster. This is the monster. His name is Anthony Fremont. He's six years old with a cute little-boy face and blue guileless eyes. But when those eyes look at you, you'd better start thinking happy thoughts. Because the mind behind them is absolutely in charge. This is the Twilight Zone.

== Plot ==
Six-year-old Anthony Fremont has godlike mental powers, including mind-reading. He has isolated his town of Peaksville, Ohio, from the rest of the world. The people must grow their own food, and supplies of common household items, such as bar soap, have been dwindling. He has blocked television signals and caused cars not to work. He creates grotesque creatures, such as three-headed gophers, which he then kills. Everybody is under his rule, even his parents.

The people live in fear of Anthony, constantly telling him how everything he does is "good", since he banishes anyone thinking unhappy thoughts forever to a place that he calls "the cornfield." Having never experienced any form of discipline, he does not understand that his actions are harmful. He is confused when his father tells him that the neighbors are reluctant to let their children play with him after he sent several of his playmates to the cornfield.

One night each week, Anthony gives the townsfolk one hour of television, which he creates and projects onto the family TV set. The adults gather around in the Fremonts' living room, squirming uncomfortably as Anthony shows them a vision of battling dinosaurs with ample gore. Unable to voice their real feelings, they tell Anthony that it was far better than what used to be on television.

Afterwards, the adults celebrate their friend Dan Hollis's birthday. He gets two presents from his wife—a bottle of brandy, one of only five bottles of liquor left in the village, and a Perry Como record. Dan is eager to listen to the record, but he is reminded by everyone that Anthony does not like singing. Getting drunk from the brandy, he starts complaining about the miserable state of the town, not being able to listen to the record, and no one singing "Happy Birthday" to him. Dan snaps and confronts the child, calling him a monster and a murderer. While Anthony's anger grows, Dan yells for someone to attack him from behind and end his reign of terror. Aunt Amy (who is not able to sing anymore because of Anthony) tentatively reaches for a fireplace poker, but no one dares to act. Anthony angrily taunts Dan for being a "bad man" and transforms him into a jack-in-the-box, causing his wife to break down. The adults are horrified at what Anthony has done, and his father asks him to wish Dan into the cornfield, which Anthony does.

Anthony then causes snow to begin falling outside. The snow will kill off at least half the crops, and the town will face starvation. Anthony's father starts to rebuke Anthony about this, but his wife and the other adults look on with worried smiles on their faces. The intimidated father then smiles and tells Anthony, "...But it's good that you're making it snow, Anthony, it's real good. And tomorrow...tomorrow's gonna be a real good day!"

== Closing narration ==
No comment here. No comment at all. We only wanted to introduce you to one of our very special citizens, little Anthony Fremont, age 6, who lives in a village called Peaksville, in a place that used to be Ohio. And if by some strange chance you should run across him, you had best think only good thoughts. Anything less than that is handled at your own risk. Because if you do meet Anthony, you can be sure of one thing: you have entered the Twilight Zone.

Rod Serling then appears on camera to promote the next episode: "This is the lobby of an inn in a small Bavarian town, and next week we'll enter it with a former SS officer. It's the first stop on his road back to relive a horror that was Nazi Germany. Mr. Joseph Schildkraut and Mr. Oscar Beregi demonstrate what happens to the monster when it is judged by the victim. Our feeling here is that this is a stark and moving a piece of drama as we have ever presented. I very much hope that you're around to make your own judgment."

== Cast ==
- John Larch as Mr. Fremont
- Cloris Leachman as Mrs. Fremont
- Don Keefer as Dan Hollis
- Billy Mumy as Anthony Fremont
- Alice Frost as Aunt Amy
- Max Showalter (as Casey Adams) as Pat Riley
- Jeanne Bates as Ethel Hollis
- Lenore Kingston as Thelma Dunn
- Tom Hatcher as Bill Soames

== Reception and legacy ==
Time named this the third-best Twilight Zone episode, behind "Time Enough at Last" and "The Monsters Are Due on Maple Street".

Rod Serling's introduction at the beginning of this episode was recycled and digitally edited for the preshow of the Disney Parks attraction The Twilight Zone Tower of Terror. In the preshow video, Serling stands in front of a service elevator door, rather than a map of the United States, and explains to guests the journey they are about to experience. The attraction, which first opened at Disney-MGM Studios in 1994, almost two decades after Serling's death, is an homage to the original series with an original story based on it. When conceiving the attraction, Disney Imagineers wanted to include Serling in the attraction and opted for a voice artist to play him; Mark Silverman was chosen by Serling's widow to provide his voice. A poster advertising "Anthony Fremont's Orchestra" is displayed next to the concierge desk in the lobby of the attraction, an ironic reference to Anthony's hatred of singing.

In 1997 TV Guide ranked the episode number 31 on its 100 Greatest Episodes of All Time list.

=== Planned remake ===
In a 1974 interview with Marvel Comics, Rod Serling said "I'm on my third draft of a feature film based on Jerome Bixby's short story, 'It's a Good Life'. We did it originally on Twilight Zone, but now we're doing a full-length version. Alan Landsburg, who produced Chariots of the Gods, is producing it. It's in the fantasy-horror genre." This was one of Serling's last interviews before his death in 1975. While the script has never been published, possibly housed with the Serling estate, a few details from Nicholas Parsai's book Rod Serling: His Life, Work, and Imagination gave some details about what this film's original vision consisted of. This film was scripted to be much more violent than its made-for television counterpart. It included Anthony ripping the limbs of the town's sheriff off, removing another man's eyeballs, making his Uncle Harvey spontaneously combust, psychologically abusing the local church's organist with a giant rat, and turning Wally Wiggins, who played a role similar to Dan Hollis in the original Jerome Bixby story and episode, into a creature that resembled a tadpole-human hybrid. During the story finale, the town's people conspire to get Anthony drunk and kill him. Their plan eventually succeeds in the end due to Anthony's aunt and Peaksville returning to the rest of the world. However, in a shocking twist, Anthony's mother is found to be pregnant with another child.

Twilight Zone: The Movie's "It's a Good Life" segment is a remake of the original episode and is directed by Joe Dante.

=== Pop culture ===
Theodore Sturgeon's "Talent" was published in the September 1953 issue of Beyond Fantasy Fiction. The story features the same omnipotent child monster concept.

The 1980 song "Cemetery Girls" by novelty rock group Barnes & Barnes refers to the episode in its lyrics ("Fresh souls in the cornfield...Anthony put them there..."), and with samples of lines. Since the album was released several years before fictional twin brothers Art (Bill Mumy) Barnes and Artie (Robert Haimer) went "public" about their identities, the reference is an in-joke.

The episode's opening narration was sampled in Michael Jackson's 2001 song "Threatened", from his album Invincible.

This episode was also remade as a parody in The Simpsons episode "Treehouse of Horror II" in 1991, with Bart in the role of Anthony.

The 1997 episode "Johnny Real Good" from Johnny Bravo is also based on this episode. Johnny has to babysit a boy named Timmy, who also has supernatural powers and sends Johnny several times to a nearby cornfield for "thinking bad thoughts."

The 2007 Pulitzer Prize-winning novel The Brief Wondrous Life of Oscar Wao uses the episode as an analogy for life under the dictator Rafael Trujillo in the Dominican Republic.

The 2017 Black Mirror episode "USS Callister" was conceived with the episode as an inspiration.

In 2025, during the September 8 episode of The Daily Show, host Jon Stewart invoked the episode to critique the sycophancy surrounding Donald Trump, quipping that Trump was “that Twilight Zone kid … [who] sent them out to the cornfield.”

=== Sequel ===
In the 2002 revival series, a sequel to this episode was broadcast, titled "It's Still a Good Life", making it the only Twilight Zone episode to have a sequel. In the episode, Anthony is a middle-aged man who now has a daughter Audrey who has inherited his powers. Bill Mumy and Cloris Leachman reprised their roles from the original episode. Anthony Fremont's daughter, Audrey, is played by Bill Mumy's real-life daughter Liliana Mumy.

A commercial for MeTV airing on that channel in 2015 features an adult Bill Mumy as adult Anthony intercut with scenes from the original episode, apparently interacting as the adult Anthony uses his powers to beam Me-TV to little Anthony's set. In early 2017, the network used clips from this episode in promos for the show's late-night reruns.

== Bibliography ==
- Zicree, Marc Scott: The Twilight Zone Companion. Sillman-James Press, 1982 (second edition)
- DeVoe, Bill. (2008). Trivia from The Twilight Zone. Albany, GA: Bear Manor Media. ISBN 978-1-59393-136-0
- Grams, Martin. (2008). The Twilight Zone: Unlocking the Door to a Television Classic. Churchville, MD: OTR Publishing. ISBN 978-0-9703310-9-0
- Diaz, Junot. Penguin Books New York (2007) The Brief Wondrous Life of Oscar Wao p.g 224
- Wiater, Stan, et al. (2007). The Stephen King Universe: The Guide to the Worlds of the King of Horror (1st ed.). Los Angeles, CA: Renaissance Books. p. 427. ISBN 978-0-525-94190-3
