= Holly Robinson =

Holly Robinson may refer to:

- Holly Robinson Peete, American actress, model and singer
- Holly Robinson (athlete), New Zealand para-athlete
- Holly Robinson (character), DC Comics character
