= It's Still a Good Life =

- The Twilight Zone episode
- Episode no.: Season 1 Episode 31
- Directed by: Allan Kroeker
- Written by: Ira Steven Behr; Based on characters created by Jerome Bixby
- Production code: 131
- Original air date: February 19, 2003

Guest appearances
- Bill Mumy; Cloris Leachman; Liliana Mumy

Episode chronology
← Previous "Into the Light"	Next → "The Monsters Are on Maple Street"

"It's Still a Good Life" is the thirty-first episode of the 2002 revival television series of The Twilight Zone. The episode was first broadcast on February 19, 2003, on UPN. It is a sequel to the original series episode "It's a Good Life". Bill Mumy and Cloris Leachman reprise their roles from the original episode. Anthony Fremont's daughter, Audrey, is played by actor Bill Mumy's real life daughter Liliana Mumy. It was written by Ira Steven Behr (based on characters created by Jerome Bixby), and directed by Allan Kroeker.

== Opening narration ==
Forty years ago, Rod Serling introduced us to a monster, a monster so powerful he was able to make the world disappear just by using his mind. For the residents of Peaksville, Ohio, the nightmare had begun. The monster knew their every thought, could feel their every emotion; and when they made him angry, which was often, he would banish them into a cornfield from which there was no return. And the most frightening thing about this monster was that he was only six years old. Now it's forty years later, and the people of Peaksville are still in Hell. Oh, yes, there's one other thing: The monster now has a child of his own, and though she possesses none of her father's powers, he still loves her very, very much.

== Plot ==
Anthony Fremont has been terrorizing the residents of the small town of Peaksville for 40 years, still using his psychokinetic powers to banish those he deems "bad", including his own wife and father, to a mythical "cornfield". His mother Agnes is shocked to discover that Anthony's beloved young daughter Audrey has inherited those powers. This discovery is soon followed by one even more shocking: Audrey can bring back things that her father has banished to the cornfield.

With this realization, Agnes – who has grown to detest her son – tries to influence her granddaughter to use her powers in order to free Peaksville from Anthony's reign of terror. When Anthony learns of his mother's plans he seeks out each co-conspirator one by one, sending them to the cornfield. Agnes finally confronts her son, letting go of all of the dismay, hatred and anger that she has suppressed for forty years, and tries to convince Audrey to use her powers against her own father and wish Anthony away. Audrey is forced to choose between her grandmother and her father, whom she loves very much.

Caught between these two sides, Audrey ultimately aligns herself with her father, saving him from a resident who attempted to hit him while his back was turned. But then to the horror of Anthony she sends her grandmother away and empties the town of Peaksville. Anthony and Audrey are left alone, but Anthony soon realizes that he misses having everyone else around. In order to cheer her father up, Audrey brings back the world beyond Peaksville, which Anthony had sent away decades prior. Audrey asks Anthony about visiting New York City, and her father replies that it is a big city with many people. Audrey implies that they had all better be nice to her and her father, otherwise they'll suffer severe consequences.

The episode ends with Anthony realizing that his daughter is far more powerful than he is, and he accepts that she has done a "real good thing" by returning the world outside of Peaksville. As a couple pulls up to ask them if they know how to get to Highway 10, Anthony and Audrey plan to travel to different places. Anthony states that "It's going to be a good day. A real good day," as they head to the two people in the car.

== Closing narration ==
No lesson to be learned here. No morals to be taught. Just an update from Peaksville, Ohio, where Anthony and Audrey Fremont want you to think happy thoughts, and you better do as you're told. Otherwise, you might wind up in that cornfield known as The Twilight Zone.

== Cast ==
- Anthony Fremont – Bill Mumy
- Agnes Fremont – Cloris Leachman
- Audrey Fremont – Liliana Mumy
- Lorna – Chilton Crane
- Joe – Robert Moloney
- Cynthia – Kerry Sandomirsky
- Timmy – Samuel Patrick Chu
- George – Paul McGillion
- Timmy's mother – Kirsten Kilburn
