= See You in September (film) =

- DVD cover
- Directed by: Tamara Tunie
- Written by: Joe Cilibrasi; Jennifer Maloney; Whitney Sugarman
- Screenplay by: Victoria Rinaldi
- Produced by: Joe Cilibrasi; Jennifer Maloney; Tamara Tunie
- Starring: Estella Warren; Michael Rispoli; Whoopi Goldberg; Justin Kirk
- Cinematography: Harlan Bosmajian
- Edited by: Kenneth Marsten
- Music by: Jeff Cardoni
- Production company: Steadfast Productions
- Distributed by: Maya Entertainment
- Release date: April 1, 2010 (US)
- Running time: 90 minutes (DVD cut)
- Country: United States
- Language: English
- Budget: $2.5 million

See You in September is a 2010 American romantic comedy film directed by Tamara Tunie and starring Estella Warren, Michael Rispoli, Whoopi Goldberg, and Justin Kirk. The alternative title is Crazy Love. The film premiered in April 2010 at Newport Beach International Film Festival and was released on DVD on February 8, 2011. See You in September is Tamara Tunie's first film both as director and as producer.

== Plot ==
Lindsay is a successful producer of commercials, but, as it often happens in big cities, her personal life is not well. Gentlemen chase her and even propose to marry, but she feels that all of them are not her type. Only psychoanalysis sessions do help her, and she can barely live without them. But one day her doctor leaves for vacation until September. Lindsay is upset but comes up with a brilliant idea—to assemble her own support group for people with the same personal problems.

Various people join the group, including two gangsters intent on robbing all those present. They bound all the participants and leave the victims alone, so they have to sit together and solve their problems. They do so.

== Cast ==
- Estella Warren as Lindsay
- Liza Lapira as Monica
- Justin Kirk as A.J.
- David Eigenberg as Max
- Sandra Bernhard as Charlotte
- Michael Rispoli as Terrence
- Maulik Pancholy as Roger
- Michael Hyatt as Eve
- Christopher Sieber as Steven
- James McDaniel as Lewis
- Brian Anthony Wilson as Cop
- Jason Kravits as Stevie
- Henry Hodges as Henry
- Lindsey Kraft as Dagney
- Whoopi Goldberg as Lindsay's Therapist
