= Gig Morton =

Canadian actor

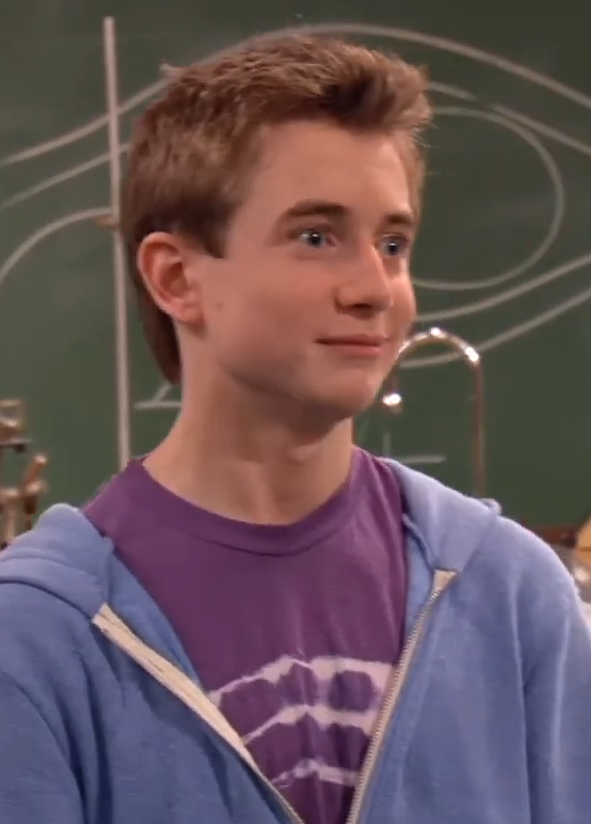
- Morton as Derby von Derbotsford in Mr. Young
- Born: March 22, 1996 (age 30); Comox, British Columbia, Canada
- Occupation: Actor
- Years active: 2005–present
- Website: GigMorton.com

Gig Morton (born March 22, 1996) is a Canadian actor and podcast host. Beginning a professional career as a child actor at age nine, Morton is a six time Young Artist Award nominee, best known for his role as B-Dawg's boy, "Billy" in four installments of the Air Buddies film franchise, Air Buddies, Snow Buddies, Space Buddies, and Santa Buddies, as well as for his co-starring role as "Derby" on the Canadian television show Mr. Young.

== Early life ==
Gig Morton was born March 22, 1996, in Comox, British Columbia. "Gig" is Morton's given name, originating from, his father's childhood nickname — as he explained in an interview, "When my dad was little—my dad's name is Gary—his little brother couldn't say Gary, so he called him ‘Gig’ and that became his nickname. And everyone calls him Gig besides my Nana, my dad’s mom."

Raised in Courtenay, British Columbia, Morton began acting at age seven when his sisters were doing community theatre. His mother and sisters convinced him to audition, and he ended up landing his first role in the Rainbow Youth Theatre's production of The Wizard of Oz. After discovering his love for musical theatre, Morton would go on to appear in numerous musical stage productions, including lead roles in the Vanier Senior Secondary's production of Adventures in the Forest, the Red Room Studio's production of Oliver! and the Courtenay Little Theatre's production of Peter Pan.

== Career ==
Morton began his professional acting career in 2005 at age nine, appearing in a commercial for Save-On-Foods, and has since appeared in numerous commercials for Aviva Insurance, Kellogg's and Mattel among others. In 2006, Morton made his film debut, appearing as the boy (known in later films as "Billy") selected to adopt the Golden Retriever puppy, "B-Dawg" in the Disney family comedy, Air Buddies, and made his television debut the following year with a small guest-starring role on the detective series Psych.

In 2008, Morton reprised his role as "Billy" in the second installment of the Air Buddies franchise, Snow Buddies, and landed his first starring role in the black comedy short film The Escape of Conrad Lard-Bottom. Later that same year he starred in the holiday fantasy film, Christmas Town as "Mason McCann", a boy who, along with his mother, discovers a town where Santa Claus and his elves are working. These roles earned Morton a total of three Young Artist Award nominations the following year as "Best Young Actor in a DVD film" for his role as "Billy" in Snow Buddies, "Best Young Actor in a Short Film" for his role as "Conrad Lard-Bottom" in The Escape of Conrad Lard-Bottom and "Best Young Actor in a TV Movie" for his role as "Mason McCann" in Christmas Town.

In 2009, Morton appeared as "Tommy Shatterfield" in the pilot for the family television drama, Mistresses, and as "John" in the western television movie Angel and the Bad Man. That same year, he once again reprised his role as "Billy" in the third and fourth installments of the Air Buddies franchise, Space Buddies and Santa Buddies. Morton was once again recognized with two Young Artist Award nominations the following year as "Best Supporting Actor in a TV Movie" for his role as "John" in Angel and the Bad Man and as "Best Young Actor in a DVD Film" for his role as "Billy" in Santa Buddies.

In 2010, Morton guest-starred on the crime series Shattered as "Stephen Alvert", the son of a wealthy German immigrant who is being investigated for murder. His dramatic performance earned him his sixth Young Artist Award nomination the following year as "Best Young Guest-Starring Actor, age 14-17, in a TV Series". In 2011, Morton appeared in a co-starring role as "Carl", one of three travelers who share a taxi with a slacker who believes he is Jesus in the comedy short, Jesus, Chris. That same year, Morton landed a co-starring role on the teen situation comedy Mr. Young, playing "Derby", the naive, but loyal best friend to a 14-year-old boy genius, played by Brendan Meyer, who takes a job as a high school science teacher.

Morton hosts a video podcast called Gig and Erika are Kids These Days.

== Personal life ==
Morton resides in Vancouver, British Columbia. He attended school on the set of Mr. Young alongside his fellow co-stars Brendan Meyer and Matreya Fedor. At age ten, after discovering his passion for musical theatre and dance, Morton began taking performance arts classes, studying acting, singing, guitar, hip-hop dancing, tap dancing and ballet. Morton's hobbies and activities include swimming, skateboarding, fencing, biking, soccer, basketball, trampoline, yo-yo tricks, video games, and robot building.

Morton married actress Erika McKitrick on September 6, 2024.

== Filmography ==
=== Film ===
Year	Title	Role	Notes
2006	Air Buddies	B-Dawg Boy (aka: Billy)	Direct-to-DVD
2008	Snow Buddies	Billy	Direct-to-DVD
2008	The Escape of Conrad Lard-Bottom	Conrad Lard-Bottom	Short film
2008	Christmas Town	Mason	Direct-to-DVD
2009	Space Buddies	Billy	Direct-to-DVD
2009	Santa Buddies	Billy	Direct-to-DVD
2010	Elopement	Skateboard kid	Feature film
2011	Jesus Chris	Carl	Short film
2019	Thirty-Seventeen	Shawn	Feature film
2019	Falling Upwards	Ethan	Short film
2021	Diary of a Wimpy Kid	Random Boy	

=== Television ===
Year	Title	Role	Notes
2007	Psych	Finn	Episode: "Gus's Dad May Have Killed an Old Guy"
2008	Past Lies	Jacob	TV movie
2008	Fear Itself	Sean Mahoney	Episode: "Family Man"
2009	Mistresses	Tommy Satterfield	Pilot
2009	Impact	Markus	Miniseries: Part 2
2009	Angel and the Bad Man	John	TV movie
2010	Shattered	Stephan Alvert	Episode: "Where's the Line?"
2011–2013	Mr. Young	Derby	Co-starring
2014	My Mother's Future Husband	Willis	TV movie
2016	Stranger in the House	Thomas	TV movie
2016	Supernatural	Elijah Peterson	Episode: "American Nightmare"
2016	Some Assembly Required	Claude Brulee	Episode: "Claude's Kitchen"
2018	Hot and Funny		Episode: "Try Being Ugly"
2021	Batwoman	College Student	Episode: "Fair Skin, Blue Eyes"
2021	Motherland: Fort Salem	Karl	Episode: "Of the Blood"
2022	Yellowjackets	Bible Instructor	Episode: "Flight of the Bumblebee"
2023	Kung Fu	Omni Tech #1	Episode: "Beginning"

== Awards ==
Awards
Year	Award	Category	Film/Series	Result	Ref.
2009	Young Artist Award	Best Performance in a Short Film - Young Actor	The Escape of Conrad Lard-bottom	Nominated	
2009	Young Artist Award	Best Performance in a TV Movie, Miniseries or Special - Leading Young Actor	Christmas Town	Nominated	
2009	Young Artist Award	Best Performance in a DVD Film	Snow Buddies	Nominated	
2010	Young Artist Award	Best Performance in a TV Movie, Miniseries or Special - Supporting Actor	Angel and the Bad Man	Nominated	
2010	Young Artist Award	Best Performance in a DVD Film	Santa Buddies	Nominated	
2011	Young Artist Award	Best Performance in a TV Series - Guest Starring Young Actor 14-17	Shattered	Nominated	
