= Henry Hodges =

American actor (born 1993)

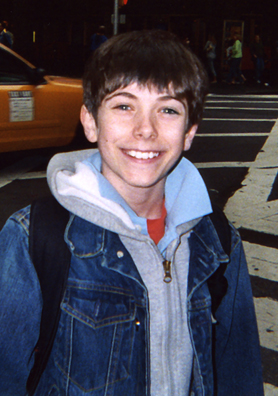
- Hodges in 2007
- Born: 1993 (age 32–33)
- Occupation: Actor
- Years active: 2006–present

Henry Hodges (born 1993) is an American actor. He is best known for his musical theatre roles on Broadway; starring as Chip Potts in Beauty and the Beast, Jeremy Potts in Chitty Chitty Bang Bang, and Michael Banks in Mary Poppins.

== Early life ==
Hodges has an older sister named Charly. Hodges appeared as Tiny Tim in the Ford's Theatre production of A Christmas Carol in Washington, D.C. He subsequently performed in numerous operas over two seasons at The Kennedy Center. After appearing in his second season at Ford's Theater, he was invited to audition for Disney and was selected to play the part of Chip in the tour of Beauty and the Beast.

== Career ==
=== Broadway ===
Hodges portrayed Chip, the son of Mrs. Potts, for seven months in the National Tour of Beauty and the Beast in 2003. He was invited to play the same part on Broadway in New York City, where he shared the stage with Christy Carlson Romano, who portrayed Belle. In 2005, he originated the role of Jeremy Potts in the Broadway production of Chitty Chitty Bang Bang.

Hodges' performance garnered the attention of theatrical producers Cameron Mackintosh and Thomas Schumacher and in 2006 he was cast as Michael Banks in the Broadway production of Mary Poppins, playing the part for over a year and a half.

Hodges portrayed MacDuff's son and Fleance in the 2008 Broadway production of Shakespeare's Macbeth, starring Patrick Stewart. He then was part of the musical 13 by Jason Robert Brown, understudying the roles of Archie, Evan, Richie, and Simon.

Hodges was also an active member of Broadway Kids Care, which brings together young actors from current and past Broadway shows to do community service work.

=== Regional Theater ===
Hodges began his acting career as a young boy in productions of Salome, Idomeneo, and M. Butterfly at the Washington Opera and Macbeth with the Kirov Opera, under the direction of opera singer Plácido Domingo. He also performed as Tiny Tim for two seasons in the Ford's Theatre production of A Christmas Carol.

As a teenager, Hodges performed at the Tony-winning Hartford Stage in two productions. The first was in the role of Jem in To Kill a Mockingbird, with Matthew Modine, which broke all box-office records for Hartford Stage. The second was portraying Horace Robedaux at age 14 in the acclaimed Horton Foote play The Orphans' Home Cycle. Hodges reprised his role when the show transferred for a successful run at the Signature Theatre in New York City where it garnered a Drama Desk Award for the "Theatrical Event of the Season'.

Next for Hodges was being a part of another Disney production. This time Hodges was Flounder in the re-envisioned production of Disney's The Little Mermaid at Sacramento Music Circus. Among the changes to the show was that Flounder was now a teenager. In addition to showcasing his acting, singing and dancing in the part, he also was able to showcase his love of wave boarding, as he added that skill to his "Under the Sea" role.

In 2014, Hodges performed the lead role of Billy McPherson in the original musical The Kid Who Would Be Pope at Ars Nova in New York City. The musical was the recipient of the 2013 Richard Rodgers Award and American Harmony Prize.

In 2015, Hodges reprised his role as Flounder in The Little Mermaid, this time at the Alabama Shakespeare Theatre. The following summer in 2016, Hodges returned to the Alabama Shakespeare Theatre to perform in the musical that led him to his Broadway Journey - this time playing the role of LeFou in Beauty and the Beast.

=== Film and television ===
Hodges has done voice-over work in a variety of commercials throughout his career. He voiced Mudbud in the films Snow Buddies and Space Buddies, part of the Air Bud series. He has also appeared in the role of Henry in the film See You in September with Whoopi Goldberg. Hodges also co-starred on the television show Elementary.

=== Books ===
In 2007, Thomas Schumacher featured Hodges in his interactive book How Does the Show Go On. He wrote an essay on a day in his life as a working actor on Broadway. Hodges also helped launch the book with its author at a signing at Barnes & Noble in New York City.

Hodges enjoyed being a part of the book so much that he wanted to write a book of his own, chronicling his acting experiences and sharing advice with other children who are interested in getting into show business. In 2013, Hodges' book, How to Act Like a Kid, was published by Disney.

Hodges' book launched with a discussion and signing at the Drama Book Shop in New York City. He also made appearances at several literary events, including: The Library of Congress National Book Festival in Washington DC (where he was the youngest of 100 authors invited to speak and participate), The Junior Theater Festival in Atlanta (as a celebrity guest), and at the Chicago Literary Festival.

== Filmography ==
=== Film ===
- Snow Buddies (2008) - Mudbud
- Space Buddies (2009) - Mudbud
- See You in September (2010) - Henry

=== Broadway ===
- Beauty and the Beast (2004–2005) - Chip Potts
- Chitty Chitty Bang Bang (2005) - Jeremy Potts
- Mary Poppins (2006–2008) - Michael Banks
- Macbeth (2008) - MacDuff's son, Fleance
- 13 (2008–2009) - Understudy for Archie, Evan, Richie, and Simon

=== Off-Broadway ===
- The Orphans' Home Cycle (2009–2010) - Horace Robedaux

=== Regional theater ===
- A Christmas Carol (2001) - Tiny Tim (Ford's Theatre)
- To Kill a Mockingbird (2009) - Jem (Hartford Stage)
- The Orphans' Home Cycle (2009) - Horace Robedaux (Hartford Stage)
- The Little Mermaid (2012) - Flounder (Broadway Sacramento)

== Awards ==
Awards
Year	Award	Category	Role	Film / Show	Result	Ref.
2010	Drama Desk Award	Special Award; Saluting "the breadth of vision, which inspired the exceptional direction, performances, sets, lighting, costumes, music and sound that made The Orphans' Home Cycle the theatrical event of the season." (shared with cast, creative team and producers)	Horace Robedaux (Age 14)	The Orphans' Home Cycle	Honored	
