= Liliana Mumy =

American actress

- Born: April 16, 1994 (age 32); San Marcos, California, U.S.
- Occupation: Actress
- Years active: 2001–present
- Spouse: Ben Perlmutter (m. 2023)
- Children: 2
- Father: Bill Mumy

Liliana Berry Davis Mumy (/ˈmuːmi/; born April 16, 1994) is an American actress. Between 2002 and 2006, she appeared as Jessica Baker in Cheaper by the Dozen and its sequel, as well as Lucy Miller in the second and third films of The Santa Clause trilogy.

In animation, Mumy performed the voice of Mertle Edmonds in the Lilo & Stitch franchise as well as Twinkle in Higglytown Heroes. For Cartoon Network, she has voiced Panini in Chowder. For Nickelodeon, she has voiced Human Kimberly in Catscratch, Roxy in the Nickelodeon revival of Winx Club, and Leni Loud in The Loud House.

== Early and personal life ==
Liliana Berry Davis Mumy was born on April 16, 1994, in San Marcos, California, the daughter of Eileen Joy Mumy (née Davis), a childbirth educator, and actor/musician Bill Mumy.

Liliana appeared with her father in the Twilight Zone revival series' episode "It's Still a Good Life".

Mumy announced her engagement to her boyfriend Ben Perlmutter on December 16, 2021. They married in September 2023. Together, they have one son who was born two months later in November 2023. Their second son was born in January 2026.

== Career ==
Mumy has appeared in several motion pictures. Her most notable film appearances are in Cheaper by the Dozen, Cheaper by the Dozen 2, The Santa Clause 2, as well as The Santa Clause 3: The Escape Clause. In 2002, Mumy played Audrey Fremont, the daughter of her father Bill's character Anthony, in a sequel to the classic The Twilight Zone episode "It's a Good Life" called "It's Still a Good Life".

Mumy provided the voice of Mertle Edmonds (Lilo Pelekai's rival) in Stitch! The Movie, Lilo & Stitch: The Series, Lilo & Stitch 2: Stitch Has a Glitch, and Leroy & Stitch, and voicing a character with a smaller role on American Dragon: Jake Long as Haley's rival at school. She is also the voice of Twinkle on Higglytown Heroes and the voice of Human Kimberly on Nickelodeon's Catscratch. Lesser roles included TV appearances playing Rachael/Rachel in six episodes on My Wife and Kids from 2002 to 2004 as well as young Donna on That '70s Show and guest starring in Scrubs as a girl at her birthday party (whose face J.D. daydreams of shoving into her cake). She also voiced Panini in the animated series Chowder, airing on Cartoon Network and played Lula in The Cleaner in 2008. She also voiced a feisty, fashionable, pink-loving, golden retriever puppy named Rosebud in the Disney movies Snow Buddies, Space Buddies, and Santa Buddies. In June 2012, Mumy started voice work as 'Beth' in Bravest Warriors, an animated series created by Pendleton Ward, produced by Frederator Studios for their channel, Cartoon Hangover, a premium content partner of YouTube. Mumy also provided the voice of Roxy on Nickelodeon's Winx Club and Leni Loud on Nickelodeon's The Loud House.

== Filmography ==
=== Television ===
Year	Show	Role	Notes
2001	Scrubs	Samantha Tanner	Episode: "My Old Lady"
2002	That '70s Show	Young Donna Pinciotti	Episode: "Class Picture"
2002	Strong Medicine	Annie	Episode: "Discharged"
2002– 2004	My Wife and Kids	Rachel McNamara	Recurring role (season 2–4)
2003	The Twilight Zone	Audrey Fremont	Episode: "It's Still a Good Life"
2003–2006	Lilo & Stitch: The Series	Mertle Edmonds (voice)	Recurring role
2004	Crossing Jordan	Lena	Episode: "After Dark"
2004–2008	Higglytown Heroes	Twinkle (voice)	Main role
2005–2006	Catscratch	Human Kimberly (voice)	Recurring role
2005, 2007	American Dragon: Jake Long	Olivia Meers (voice)	2 episodes
2007	Eloise: The Animated Series	Debbie	Episode: "Eloise Goes to Hollywood Part 1"
2007	Help Me Help You	Madison	Episode: "Boxer"
2007–2010	Chowder	Panini (voice)	Main role
2008–2009	The Cleaner	Lula Banks	Main role
2008	Batman: The Brave and the Bold	Doll, Kid #2 (voice)	Episode: "Invasion of the Secret Santas!"
2009–2010	The Secret Saturdays	Wadi (voice)	3 episodes
2012–2014	Winx Club	Roxy (voice)	Main role (season 4–6)
2012–2018	Bravest Warriors	Beth Tezuka (voice)	Main role
2015–present	Ridge Middle School	Eric Winans, Megan Krueger, Alana Schriver (voice)	Main role
2015	Sofia the First	Amy (voice)	Episode: "Substitute Cedric"
2015–2016	Fresh Off the Boat	Layla	2 episodes
2016–present	The Loud House	Leni Loud (voice)	Main role
2017	Shimmer and Shine	Ayla (voice)	Episode: "Hairdos and Hair-Don'ts"
2017	Be Cool, Scooby-Doo!	Historical Celebration Daughter (voice)	Episode: "World of Witchcraft"
2020	The Casagrandes	Leni Loud (voice)	Episode: "Cursed!"

=== Film ===
Year	Film	Role	Notes
2002	The Santa Clause 2	Lucy Miller	
2003	Stitch! The Movie	Mertle Edmonds (voice)	Direct-to-video film
2003	Cheaper by the Dozen	Jessica Baker	
2004	Howl's Moving Castle	Madge/Young Girl (voice)	
2004	Mulan II	Additional voices	Direct-to-video film
2005	Holly Hobbie & Friends: Surprise Party	Amy Morris (voice)	Direct-to-video film
2005	My Neighbors the Yamadas	Nonoko Yamada (voice)	English dub
2005	Lilo & Stitch 2: Stitch Has a Glitch	Mertle Edmonds (voice)	Direct-to-video film
2005	The Happy Elf	Sister (voice)	Direct-to-video film
2005	Cheaper by the Dozen 2	Jessica Baker	
2006	Barnyard	Chick (voice)	
2006	Holly Hobbie & Friends: Christmas Wishes	Amy Morris (voice)	Direct-to-video film
2006	Leroy & Stitch	Mertle Edmonds (voice)	Direct-to-video film
2006	The Santa Clause 3: The Escape Clause	Lucy Miller	
2006	Holly Hobbie & Friends: Surpise Party	Amy Morris (voice)	Direct-to-video film
2007	Holly Hobbie & Friends: Secret Adventures	Amy Morris (voice)	Direct-to-video film
2007	Holly Hobbie & Friends: Best Friends Forever	Amy Morris (voice)	Direct-to-video film
2008	Snow Buddies	Rosebud (voice)	Direct-to-video film
2009	Space Buddies	Rosebud (voice)	Direct-to-video film
2010	Kiss Me Again	Sveva (voice)	Direct-to-video film
2010	Santa Buddies	Rosebud (voice)	Direct-to-video film
2011	Batman: Year One	Holly Robinson (voice)	
2011	DC Showcase: Catwoman	Holly Robinson (voice)	Direct-to-video film
2021	The Loud House Movie	Leni Loud (voice)	
2024	No Time to Spy: A Loud House Movie	Leni Loud (voice)	
2025	A Loud House Christmas Movie: Naughty or Nice	Leni Loud (voice)	
