= Batman: Year One (film) =

2011 film directed by Lauren Montgomery, Sam Liu

- DVD cover
- Directed by: Sam Liu; Lauren Montgomery
- Written by: Tab Murphy
- Based on: Batman: Year One by: Frank Miller; David Mazzucchelli
- Produced by: Bruce Timm; Alan Burnett; Lauren Montgomery; Sam Register
- Starring: Bryan Cranston; Ben McKenzie; Eliza Dushku; Jon Polito; Alex Rocco; Katee Sackhoff
- Edited by: Margaret Hou
- Music by: Christopher Drake
- Production companies: Warner Premiere; DC Entertainment; Warner Bros. Animation; MOI Animation (Animation services)
- Distributed by: Warner Home Video
- Release date: October 18, 2011
- Running time: 64 minutes
- Country: United States
- Language: English
- Budget: $3.5 million

Batman: Year One is a 2011 American animated superhero film based on the four-issue story arc of the same name printed in 1987. It was directed by Lauren Montgomery and Sam Liu. The film premiered at Comic-Con on July 22 and was officially released on October 18, 2011.

It is the 12th film released under the DC Universe Animated Original Movies banner and was released on DVD, Blu-ray and digital copy. The film received positive reviews upon release for its animation and faithfulness to the source material. It was also a commercial success, bringing in $6.1 million on a budget of $3.5 million.

== Plot ==
Billionaire Bruce Wayne returns home to Gotham City after twelve years abroad, training for his eventual one-man war against crime. James "Jim" Gordon moves to Gotham with his wife, Barbara, after a transfer from Chicago. Both are swiftly acquainted with the corrupt and violent atmosphere of the city. Gordon tries to focus on purging corruption from the Gotham City Police Department after witnessing his partner, Arnold Flass, abuse his power as a cop. Unfortunately, several officers led by Flass beat him on orders from his superior, Commissioner Gillian Loeb. In revenge, Gordon tracks Flass down, beats him, and leaves him naked and handcuffed in the snow.

Bruce believes he is still unprepared to fight against crime despite having the skills he learned abroad. He goes in disguise on a surveillance mission in Gotham's red-light district but is reluctantly drawn into a brawl with several prostitutes, including Holly Robinson and Selina Kyle. Two crooked police officers shoot Bruce on sight and take him away in their patrol car. Bruce breaks free, subdues the cops, flees from the scene, and returns to Wayne Manor barely alive. He sits before his father's bust, requesting guidance in his war against crime. A bat suddenly crashes through a window and settles on the bust, inspiring Bruce to save Gotham as Batman.

With Bruce striking as Batman for weeks, street crime significantly declines. Even Flass is attacked while in the middle of accepting a bribe from Jefferson Skeevers, a drug dealer of Carmine Falcone. Sometime later, Bruce infiltrates the mansion of Gotham's mayor as Batman where he threatens all the dinner party guests, including Loeb and Falcone. Loeb immediately orders Gordon and GCPD Sergeant Sarah Essen to arrest Batman. The two cops and Batman eventually cross paths as they separately prevent an incident of an old lady getting hit by a runaway truck from happening. More GCPD officers arrive at the scene, forcing Batman to flee into an abandoned building. Loeb personally deploys in a police helicopter to oversight the situation. Bombs are dropped onto the building from the copter to demolish the place. A SWAT team led by a trigger-happy commander, Branden, is sent in to continue the manhunt. Batman uses a signal device to attract a swarm of bats from the Batcave as his only route to escape.

Gordon and Essen have a brief affair and they date for two months. Essen, however, chooses to end the relationship upon learning Gordon is going to be the father of Barbara's child. Gordon is prompted to confess his affair with Essen to Barbara before matters get worse. War against corruption within GCPD continues with Flass and Skeevers under interrogations. Skeevers gets bailed with the help of a hired lawyer but is attacked by Batman shortly after, who convinces him to testify against Flass. In retaliation, Loeb uses proof of Gordon's affair with Essen as his own leverage to blackmail Gordon into ceasing everything against him. Barbara repeatedly receives threatening phone calls for days. Skeevers is drugged with rat poison as an attempt of assassination, so that he remains silent about the ties between Loeb and the mafia, although Skeevers ultimately survives.

Bruce sneaks into Falcone's manor as Batman and overhears the private conversation between Falcone and his nephew, Johnny Viti. Gordon leaves home on Loeb's orders but becomes suspicious when he spots a motorcyclist entering his home parking lot at high speed. He turns back, only to discover Viti and his men already holding his family hostage. Viti attempts to flee the scene with Gordon's infant son. The motorcyclist tries to intervene, but Gordon shoots him and takes the motorcycle to chase after Viti. The motorcyclist turns out to be Bruce who surmised Falcone and Viti's intent to target Gordon's family earlier on, he quickly gets back on his feet to continue the pursuit. Gordon and Viti end up fighting on a bridge until the baby falls. Bruce catches up in time and leaps over the bridge's railing to save the baby. Gordon thanks Bruce for saving his infant son's life and lets him go. Flass supplies Assistant District Attorney Harvey Dent with the evidence and testimony needed to implicate Loeb, who resigns in disgrace. Gordon is promoted to captain and prepares to meet with Batman to investigate a potential plot orchestrated by a criminal calling himself the Joker.

== Voice cast ==
- Bryan Cranston as Lieutenant James "Jim" Gordon
- Ben McKenzie as Bruce Wayne / Batman
- Eliza Dushku as Selina Kyle / Catwoman
- Jon Polito as Commissioner Gillian B. Loeb
- Alex Rocco as Carmine Falcone
- Katee Sackhoff as Detective Sarah Essen
- Jeff Bennett as Alfred Pennyworth
- Grey DeLisle as Barbara Eileen Kean (credited), Vicki Vale (uncredited)
- Robin Atkin Downes as Harvey Dent
- Keith Ferguson as Jefferson Skeevers
- Danny Jacobs as Flass's Attorney
- Nick Jameson as Officer Stanley "Stan" Merkel
- Liliana Mumy as Holly Robinson
- Pat Musick as Louisa Falcone
- Stephen Root as Lieutenant Branden
- Fred Tatasciore as Detective Arnold Flass, Johnny Viti
- Steve Blum as Stan (credited), Tom (uncredited)

== Production ==
Producer Bruce Timm noted that the adaptation of the film was relatively straightforward due to the cinematic nature of the original story arc. Bryan Cranston originally turned down the role as James Gordon because he was unfamiliar with both animation and classic comics. Cranston said: "I wasn't aware of this level of storytelling in animation."

Despite largely adapting the comic book directly, some changes were made for the animated film to achieve the demands of the rating, including the alteration of scenes involving cigarette smoking and cocaine use.

== Reception ==
=== Critical response ===
Batman: Year One received positive reviews upon its release. Rotten Tomatoes gives the film a score of 88% based on reviews from eight critics, with an average rating of 6.6/10.

An IGN review of the film, after its Comic-Con screening, praised the voice actors and concluded with, "This is real, serious adult entertainment that should satisfy longtime fans and newcomers as well." Another review from IGN panned the film, describing it as "dead on arrival – a lifeless bore with stale voice work and a disjointed, sporadic narrative that was best kept on the pages of Frank Miller's stellar graphic novel."

Tommy Cook of Collider called the film a "faithful adaptation". The A.V. Club gave the film an A−, saying, "Batman: Year One is a stellar adaptation, copying Miller's words and Mazzucchelli's images almost verbatim at times." Concluding that, "It all recalls what it felt like to read Batman: Year One for the first time, and sense that this was a story that had always existed."

Cinemacrazed criticized the short run time of the film as its main downfall. James O'Ehley of SciFiMoviePage notes that the faithfulness to the source material works for and against the film, with voiceover and dialogue slowing down the action, and he goes on to say how the animation could be bolder, the voices gruffer and the sound more stirring but that overall the film is better than other DC animated films.

In an article for The Missing Slate, discussing the influence of the comic version of Batman: Year One on film depictions of Batman, Michael Dodd praised the casting of Bryan Cranston as James "Jim" Gordon. Referencing Cranston's famous role as Walter White on Breaking Bad, he argued that the choice of casting "truly encompassed the character's determination and downright badass attitude in the comic Year One".

== Sales ==
The film earned $6.1 million from domestic home media sales.

== Home media ==
The DVD and Blu-ray release includes a short animated film titled Catwoman. In the film, Catwoman deals with the crime boss Rough Cut (voiced by John DiMaggio) while trying to stop a cargo shipment. There is also a sneak peek for the 2012 film Justice League: Doom, two featurettes, a commentary, a digital comic book, two Batman: The Animated Series episodes ("Catwalk" and "Cult of the Cat"), a standard edition of the film, and a high definition edition of the film.

On August 11, 2015, Warner Home Video re-released the film on a combo pack (ISBN 1401260047), which includes the graphic novel it was based on and a copy of DVD and Blu-ray.

In 2019, it was released as part of the Batman 80th Anniversary DVD Collection, which came with 18 animated Batman films. It released alongside Batman: Gotham Knight, Batman: Under the Red Hood, Batman vs. Robin, Batman: Bad Blood, Son of Batman, Batman: The Dark Knight Returns, Batman: Assault on Arkham, Batman: The Killing Joke, Batman: Gotham by Gaslight, Batman Ninja, Batman: Return of the Caped Crusaders, Batman: Mask of the Phantasm, Batman: Mystery of the Batwoman, Superman/Batman: Public Enemies, and Superman/Batman: Apocalypse.

On November 9, 2021, the film got a 4K UHD Blu-ray release as part of its 10th, titled "Commemorative Edition."
