= Holly Robinson (character) =

Character in DC universe

- Holly Robinson as she appeared on the cover of Catwoman (vol. 3) #15 (January 2003). Art by JG Jones and T. Horie.

Publication information
- Publisher: DC Comics
- First appearance: As Holly: Batman #404 (February 1987); As Catwoman: Catwoman (vol. 3) #53 (March 2006)
- Created by: Frank Miller (writer); David Mazzucchelli (artist)

In-story information
- Alter ego: Holly "Go-Nightly" Robinson
- Supporting character of: Catwoman
- Abilities: Skilled martial artist and hand-to-hand combatant; Skilled acrobat and gymnast

Holly Robinson is a character appearing in American comic books published by DC Comics, commonly in association with the superhero Batman. Holly Robinson is a frequent ally and sidekick of Catwoman. She was trained by Wildcat and her friend Selina Kyle, and temporarily became the new Catwoman following the birth of Selina's daughter.

In 2004, the Catwoman comic won a GLAAD Media Award for its positive portrayal of Holly as an openly gay character.

== Publication history ==
Holly Robinson first appeared in Batman #404 during the Batman: Year One story arc. She was created by Frank Miller and David Mazzucchelli.

== Fictional character biography ==
=== Year One ===
Holly first appeared in Batman: Year One as a juvenile prostitute who lives with Selina Kyle. Holly plays a small but significant role in the story when she encounters a disguised Bruce Wayne during one of his early attempts at crimefighting and stabs him in the leg even though he'd saved her from her pimp. Wounded by this attack and a subsequent battle, Wayne escapes back to his home, brooding on the fact that his enemies do not fear him. This encounter is an impetus for his creation of the Batman persona. As such, Holly plays an indirect role in the Dark Knight's origin.

Holly also appeared in the 1989 Catwoman mini-series by Mindy Newell and J.J Birch (collected in trade paperback as Catwoman: Her Sister's Keeper), which retold Catwoman's origin based on Miller's take on the character in Batman: Year One. In this story, Catwoman leaves Holly at a convent where Selina's sister Maggie is a nun.

=== Death and return ===
In 1988, Holly appeared in "The Tin Roof Club", from Action Comics Weekly #611–614. In this story, she has married a successful businessman who is actually a mobster. Her new husband has Holly killed in his quest to reclaim a valuable piece of jewelry that Catwoman stole from one of his safehouses. Unable to link Holly's death to her husband in order for him to be arrested for the crime, Catwoman kills two corrupt security guards in his employment and frames Holly's husband for their murders.

Holly Robinson in Catwoman Secret Files and Origins #1, art by Cameron Stewart.

Holly's death was overturned years later when writer Ed Brubaker ignored "The Tin Roof Club" storyline to incorporate Holly into the cast of the 2002 Catwoman series. Brubaker admitted in an interview that he had not been aware of Holly's death until after he had reintroduced the character. He addressed this issue in Catwoman Secret Files and Origins #1 with a two-page story titled "Why Holly Isn't Dead", in which the fourth wall is broken as Holly contemplates her own resurrection. It is implied that Holly's death was erased from continuity following Zero Hour: Crisis in Time!.

As established by Brubaker, Holly had run away from a bad home as a child, ending up on the streets. She and Selina had met when Selina rescued Holly from a cop who was trying to extort her. When Selina became Catwoman, she left Holly behind. Holly had joined Selina's sister, Maggie, at her convent. She never felt entirely a part of that world, and a few years afterwards she left the convent with Maggie. After she and Maggie lost track of each other, Holly became addicted to drugs and returned to the streets. In this revision of Holly's history, the events of "The Tin Roof Club" never occurred.

=== Catwoman (volume 3) ===
Holly reappeared in Catwoman (vol. 3) #1. After a series of brutal murders of working girls, Holly returns to the apartment that she and Selina had shared in "Year One", and finding that Selina has returned, is happily reunited with her friend.

Holly cleans up her act and becomes a sidekick of sorts to Catwoman. She pretends to be part of the street life when in actuality, she is working as Selina's eyes and ears, ferreting out what is happening on the streets of the East End. While on the job, Holly is troubled by the fact that she still views the world from the mindset of a junkie, even though she managed to quit drugs several months before reuniting with Selina. It is also revealed that Holly is a lesbian.

In the "Relentless" story arc, Black Mask attempts to destroy Catwoman's life with the help of Sylvia, a childhood friend of Selina's who has a grudge against her. Holly is reunited with her friend Maggie Kyle, but Maggie is kidnapped and tormented by Black Mask. Holly is also beaten and kidnapped, and eventually Holly kills Sylvia to save Selina's life. Holly is severely traumatized by these events and isolates herself for a time. She steals some of Maggie's painkillers, but does not take any of the drugs, and heals to some degree when she reconnects with Selina.

Selina decides that Holly needs some time away from Gotham to heal after the events of "Relentless", and the two embark on a road trip in Catwoman (vol. 3) #20–24 (collected in trade paperback as Catwoman: Wild Ride). Selina arranges for Holly to be trained by Ted Grant (Wildcat). They then travel through several cities before ending up in St. Roch, where it is revealed that Selina and Slam Bradley have located her brother Davey. She finds him working at a bar and learns that he had also run away, and had traveled around the world.

Later in the series, Holly becomes a den mother to a group of street kids known as the Alleytown Gang, who act as informants for Catwoman.

=== The new Catwoman ===
After the events of Infinite Crisis, DC Comics jumped forward in time. In the "One Year Later" storyline, Holly Robinson has taken over as the new Catwoman at the request of Selina Kyle, who has decided to retire from the role after becoming pregnant.

In Catwoman (vol. 3) #53, Holly Robinson makes her first appearance as Catwoman; at the close of the issue she is ambushed by Angle Man. Although Holly escapes, she is caught on film administering a brutal beating to Angle Man. Reluctant to ask Selina for help, Holly turns instead to Ted Grant.

Holly is arrested and takes the blame for the murder of Black Mask (Selina had actually committed the crime). She is rescued from jail by Selina and takes a short break from being Catwoman. While Selina is getting Holly's name erased from the police database, Holly again suits up as Catwoman to stop a new villainess named Blitzkrieg from executing a young girl on a live video-feed to the internet. Holly manages to save the girl, but not before she is unmasked on the live web feed.

After the rescue, Holly runs into Detective Lenahan, a Gotham cop who has become fixated on capturing Catwoman. They are confronted by Hammer and Sickle, who want Selina dead, and are perfectly willing to dispose of Holly in the meantime. Lenahan is killed by the Russian supervillains, but Selina arrives in time to save Holly. The police assume that Holly and Catwoman are responsible for Lenahan's death after finding the two women next to his corpse in Catwoman (vol. 3) #67.

Holly and Selina manage to escape from the GCPD and defeat Hammer and Sickle. Despite this, Holly is now wanted for Lenahan's murder and her identity as Catwoman is public knowledge. She exits the series in Catwoman (vol. 3) #69 and begins a new life as a fugitive.

=== Countdown ===
Holly first appears in Countdown #47; she rescues an elderly homeless man, moving him away from debris falling from a destroyed building. Homeless herself and on the run for the murder of Black Mask, she is offered a place to stay by a mysterious woman wearing a stola or chiton who goes by the name Athena. Holly accepts the offer to stay at an Athenian Women's Shelter, which houses battered and abused women. One of the residents is a reformed Harley Quinn.

After some time at the women's shelter, it eventually becomes apparent that Athena, running the shelter, is in fact the nefarious Granny Goodness who takes to training these women - Holly and Harley among them - to be her new Female Furies. After they are brought to an island for training, Holly and Harley meet the Amazon queen Hippolyta, and encounter Mary Marvel. The group reveal Granny's deception. Holly, Harley and Mary follow Granny Goodness as she retreats to Apokolips. With Mary's help, the group manages to free the Greek gods, and Holly is granted the powers of Diana (Goddess of the Hunt) as a reward and displays both archery skills and feral, cat-like physical enhancements. After returning to Earth, Holly loses these powers. After witnessing the "Great Disaster" on Earth-51, she returns to Gotham City alongside Jason Todd and Harley, with whom she leaves at the end of the series.

In the first issue of the series Gotham City Sirens, it is mentioned that Holly no longer lives with Harley Quinn, and has decided to begin a new life elsewhere with money she received after helping Selina steal Tommy Elliot's fortune.

=== DC Rebirth ===
In 2016, DC Comics implemented another relaunch of its books called "DC Rebirth" which restored its continuity to a form much as it was prior to "The New 52". Holly is a former child prostitute who was trained in the martial arts by Selina as a way of keeping her safe. When a terrorist cell from Kahndaq bombs the orphanage Holly grew up in, she uses her training to hunt down and murder each member of the group. Holly ends up killing 237 terrorists, after which Selina chooses to take the fall for her crimes in order to protect her. Batman uncovers this, but Holly attacks him and manages to flee the country before he can take her into custody. She assumes the alias Catherine Ann Turley in this universe.

== Skills, resources and abilities ==
Holly has no meta-abilities. She has been taught stealth, athletics, hot-wiring, lock-picking, thieving, acrobatics, and martial arts by Selina. Ted Grant trained her in a form of kick-boxing adapted for street use, as well as English boxing. She has also spent time at a Female Furies training camp. She is proficient in the use of firearms, knives, and the whip. As of Countdown to Final Crisis #10, Holly had a portion of the cunning and skill of Diana, Goddess of the Hunt. While she possessed these powers, she was an excellent marksman, and had the ability to track people by their scent. She lost these powers after returning to Earth.

== In other media ==
=== Television ===
Maven, a character analogous to Holly Robinson, appears in Batman: The Animated Series, voiced by Mary McDonald Lewis. She is portrayed as Selina's secretary and knows about her exploits as Catwoman.

=== Film ===
- Holly Robinson appears in Batman: Year One, voiced by Liliana Mumy.
- Holly Robinson appears in DC Showcase: Catwoman, voiced again by Liliana Mumy.
- Jen, a character inspired by Holly Robinson, appears in The Dark Knight Rises, portrayed by Juno Temple. She is portrayed as Selina Kyle's younger housemate and accomplice.
- Annika Kosolov, a character inspired by Holly Robinson, appears in The Batman, portrayed by Hana Hrzic. This version was a prostitute at the Iceberg Lounge with a close friendship with Selina Kyle, before she was killed by Carmine Falcone, due to her involvement to a conspiracy behind Gotham's corrupt government.

== See also ==
- Homosexuality in the Batman franchise
