= The Twilight Zone (2002 TV series) =

2002 TV series

- Genre: Fantasy; Horror; Mystery; Science fiction; Thriller
- Created by: Rod Serling
- Presented by: Forest Whitaker
- Composer: Mark Snow
- Countries of origin: United States; Canada
- Original language: English
- No. of seasons: 1
- No. of episodes: 43

Production
- Executive producers: John Watson; Mark Stern; Ira Steven Behr; Pen Densham
- Production locations: Vancouver, British Columbia
- Running time: 22 minutes
- Production companies: Spirit Dance Entertainment; Trilogy Entertainment Group; Joshmax Productions Services; New Line Television

Original release
- Network: UPN
- Release: September 18, 2002 – May 21, 2003

Related
- The Twilight Zone (1959–64); The Twilight Zone (1985–89); The Twilight Zone (2019–20)

The Twilight Zone is a science fiction horror anthology television series presented by Forest Whitaker. It is the second of three revivals of Rod Serling's original 1959–64 television series. It aired for one season on the UPN network, with actor Forest Whitaker assuming Serling's role as narrator and on-screen host. It was a co-production between Spirit Dance Entertainment, Trilogy Entertainment Group, Joshmax Productions Services, and New Line Television. It premiered on September 18, 2002, and aired its final episode on May 21, 2003.

== Series history ==
Broadcast in an hour format with two half-hour stories, it was canceled after one season. Reruns continue to air in syndication, have aired on MyNetworkTV since summer 2008, and stream on Tubi as of fall 2023.

The series tended to address contemporary issues head-on; e.g. terrorism, racism, gender roles, sexuality, and stalking. Noteworthy episodes featured Jason Alexander as Death wanting to retire from harvesting souls, Lou Diamond Phillips as a swimming pool cleaner being shot repeatedly in his dreams, Susanna Thompson as a woman whose stated wish results in an "upgrading" of her family, Usher as a police officer being bothered by telephone calls from beyond the grave, Brian Austin Green as a businessman who encounters items from his past that somehow reappear, Jeffrey Combs as a hypochondriac whose diseases become reality, and Katherine Heigl playing a woman who went back in time on a suicide mission to kill the infant Adolf Hitler.

The series also includes remakes and updates of stories presented in the original Twilight Zone television series, including the famous "Eye of the Beholder" starring Molly Sims. One of the updates, "The Monsters Are on Maple Street", is a modernized version of the classic episode "The Monsters Are Due on Maple Street". The original show was about the paranoia surrounding a neighborhood-wide blackout. In the course of the episode, somebody suggests an alien invasion being the cause of the blackouts, and that one of the neighbors may be an alien. The anti-alien hysteria is an allegory for the anti-communist paranoia of the time, and the 2003 remake, starring Andrew McCarthy and Titus Welliver, replaces aliens with terrorists.

The show also contains "It's Still a Good Life", a sequel to the events of "It's a Good Life", an episode of the original series produced 41 years earlier. Bill Mumy returned to play the adult version of Anthony, the demonic child he had played in the original story, with Mumy's daughter, Liliana, appearing as Anthony's daughter, an initially more benevolent but even more powerful child. Cloris Leachman also returned as Anthony's mother. Mumy went on to serve as a screenwriter for other episodes in the revival.

Other guest stars include: Penn Badgley, Scott Bairstow, Jason Bateman, Gil Bellows, Elizabeth Berkley, Xander Berkeley, Olivia d'Abo, Linda Cardellini, Keith Hamilton Cobb, Rory Culkin, Reed Diamond, Shannon Elizabeth, Ethan Embry, Rob Estes, Sean Patrick Flanery, Lukas Haas, Wood Harris, Hill Harper, Jonathan Jackson, Moira Kelly, Erik King, Wayne Knight, Wallace Langham, Method Man, Samantha Mathis, Christopher McDonald, Tangi Miller, Pat O'Brien, Adrian Pasdar, Emily Perkins, Jeremy Piven, Jaime Pressly, James Remar, Portia de Rossi, Eriq La Salle, Michael Shanks, Jeremy Sisto, Jessica Simpson, Ione Skye, Amber Tamblyn, Christopher Titus, Robin Tunney, Vincent Ventresca, Dylan Walsh, Don S. Davis, Frank Whaley, Alicia Witt, and Gordon Michael Woolvett. McDonald, Langham, Xander Berkeley, and Haas had all previously guest starred in the 1980s revival.

== Theme song ==
An original opening was used for the first half of the season which included images of Rod Serling and a creepier musical arrangement. This was changed to the more iconic opening with a rock-theme score provided by Jonathan Davis (singer of the band Korn). This version of the opening has the Serling images removed and would be the main one used in all episodes in future reruns and on the DVD boxset release.

== Cancellation ==
The series did not enjoy the same level of critical or ratings success as the original series or the 1980s revival, and only lasted one season.

== Episodes ==
No.	Title	Directed by	Written by	Original release date	Prod. code
1	"Evergreen"	Allan Kroeker	Jill Blotevogel	September 18, 2002	106
A rebellious teenage girl (Amber Tamblyn) and her struggling family move to a gated community with a stringent emphasis on conforming to certain norms... and a unique way of dealing with troubled youths.
2	"One Night at Mercy"	Peter O'Fallon	Christopher Mack	September 18, 2002	103
An up-and-coming doctor (Tyler Christopher) suffering from severe headaches encounters Death (Jason Alexander), who takes the form of a suicidal patient while looking to take a break from his life's work.
3	"Shades of Guilt"	Perry Lang	Ira Steven Behr	September 25, 2002	107
After refusing to save an African-American college professor (Hill Harper) from being fatally attacked by skinheads, a Caucasian man (Vincent Ventresca) finds himself being mistaken for an African-American man by everyone around him.
4	"Dream Lover"	Peter O'Fallon	Frederick Rappaport	September 25, 2002	105
A graphic novelist (Adrian Pasdar) suffering from a severe case of writer's block struggles to draw the line between fantasy and reality after bringing his ideal woman (Shannon Elizabeth) to life.
5	"Cradle of Darkness"	Jean de Segonzac	Kamran Pasha	October 2, 2002	104
A woman (Katherine Heigl) goes back in time to Austria, 1889, in a desperate attempt to change history by assassinating Adolf Hitler in his infancy, preventing World War II from ever taking place.
6	"Night Route"	Jean de Segonzac	Jill Blotevogel	October 2, 2002	102
An English professor (Ione Skye) trying to prepare for her wedding believes that she is being followed by a mysterious bus, which started haunting her after she and her dog narrowly avoided being hit by a car.
7	"Time Lapse"	John T. Kretchmer	James Crocker	October 9, 2002	109
An orderly (Ethan Embry) suffering from blackouts discovers his condition to be the result of a police officer using his body to prevent an assassination attempt on the President of the United States and the First Daughter.
8	"Dead Man's Eyes"	Jerry Levine	Frederick Rappaport	October 9, 2002	108
In an updated version of the original Twilight Zone episode "Dead Man's Shoes", an emotionally distraught widow (Portia de Rossi) obsessed with bringing her late husband's killer to justice discovers that she can see his life, and the events surrounding his death, through his eyeglasses.
9	"The Pool Guy"	Paul Shapiro	Hans Beimler	October 16, 2002	111
A pool cleaner (Lou Diamond Phillips) working for a wealthy couple starts suffering from recurring nightmares where a man (Mackenzie Gray) approaches him, tells him to wake up, and guns him down.
10	"Azoth the Avenger Is a Friend of Mine"	Brad Turner	Brent V. Friedman	October 16, 2002	112
A young boy (Rory Culkin) abused by neighborhood bullies and his alcoholic father learns a valuable life lesson about vengeance and courage after willing his favorite barbarian superhero, Azoth the Avenger (Patrick Warburton), to life.
11	"The Lineman"	Jonathan Frakes	Pen Densham	October 23, 2002	101
After getting struck by lightning, a lineman (Jeremy Piven) gradually discovers that he's gained the ability to hear other people's thoughts. He starts using his new powers for personal and financial gain, but soon discovers that they come with a price.
12	"Harsh Mistress"	Brad Turner	Bradley Thompson & David Weddle	October 30, 2002	110
A wannabe rock star (Lukas Haas) gains talent, wealth, and international stardom after purchasing a classic guitar with dark powers and an equally dark past.
13	"Upgrade"	Joe Chappelle	Robert Hewitt Wolfe	October 30, 2002	113
A housewife (Susanna Thompson) tries to move into a new house with her dysfunctional family while fantasizing about the life she wants to live, preventing her seemingly idyllic fantasies from becoming reality.
14	"To Protect and Serve"	Joe Chappelle	Kamran Pasha	November 6, 2002	115
An idealistic young police officer (Usher) dedicates himself to doing whatever it takes to protect a prostitute and family friend (Samantha Becker) from the vindictive ghost of her pimp (Dion Johnstone), whom the officer was forced to shoot and kill in the line of duty.
15	"Chosen"	Winrich Kolbe	Ira Steven Behr	November 6, 2002	114
A destitute man (Jake Busey) sets out to unearth what he believes to be a conspiracy coinciding with the arrival of two persistent evangelists (Andrew Moxham and Kim Hawthorne), several disappearances, and a potential nuclear Armageddon.
16	"Sensuous Cindy"	John T. Kretchmer	James Crocker	November 13, 2002	116
A magazine writer (Greg Germann) whose fiancée firmly refuses to have sex until after marriage interacts with a virtual-reality simulation to relieve his stress with Sensous Cindy (Jaime Pressly), an artificial intelligence taking the form of a beautiful woman who wants him all to herself.
17	"Hunted"	Patrick Norris	Christopher Mack	November 13, 2002	117
The members of an elite special forces team (Scott Bairstow and Marisol Nichols) of a futuristic utopia free of violence and criminal activity set out to track and execute a vicious creature responsible for the deaths of several civilians.
18	"Mr. Motivation"	Deran Sarafian	Story by : Steven Aspis; Teleplay by : Brent V. Friedman	November 20, 2002	118
Mr. Motivation (voiced by Pat O'Brien), a doll with a sinister personality, encourages a timid pharmaceutical employee (Wallace Langham) to stand up to his crooked boss (Christopher McDonald) and take control of his life.
19	"Sanctuary"	Patrick Norris	James Crocker	November 20, 2002	119
Two agents, one in sports (Rob Estes) and the other in real estate (Elizabeth Berkley) find themselves stranded in a modern version of the Garden of Eden. They struggle to keep their idyllic world from crumbling when an injured motorcyclist (Nicki Aycox) with a working cell phone arrives.
20	"Future Trade"	Bob Balaban	Clyde Hayes	November 27, 2002	121
A man (Frank Whaley) with a dead-end job at a big-box store and a dysfunctional family learns that leading a rich life isn't everything he hoped after trading his future for that of a man with a trophy wife (Sofia Milos).
21	"Found and Lost"	Vern Gillum	Story by : Bill Mumy; Teleplay by : Frederick Rappaport	November 27, 2002	120
A troubled businessman (Brian Austin Green) receives the opportunity to go back in time, revisit his past, and make a second attempt to win the heart of the young woman he once loved (Moira Kelly).
22	"Gabe's Story"	Allan Kroeker	Dusty Kay	December 11, 2002	123
Deliveryman Gabe (Christopher Titus), who suffers from consistent bad luck, sets out to challenge fate after getting into a car accident, hitting his head, and gaining the uncanny ability to see the events surrounding his unlucky breaks, where he sees a mysterious man in a jumpsuit (Kelly Perine).
23	"Last Lap"	Brad Turner	Rob Hedden	December 11, 2002	122
A young man (Greg Serano) takes his terminally ill childhood friend (Clifton Collins, Jr.) to a local racetrack for a last ride in his GT street racer, resulting in unexpected consequences for both men.
24	"The Path"	Jerry Levine	James Crocker	January 8, 2003	125
A dissatisfied tabloid magazine writer (Linda Cardellini) gradually grows obsessed with relying on a fortune teller (Method Man) who provides uncannily accurate predictions about where her life is headed.
25	"Fair Warning"	John T. Kretchmer	David Weddle & Bradley Thompson	January 8, 2003	124
A flower shop employee (Taryn Manning) finds herself struggling to convince people that a pet store employee (Devon Gummersall) suffering from dissociative identity disorder is stalking her.
26	"Another Life"	Risa Bramon Garcia	Amir Mann & Brent V. Friedman	February 5, 2003	126
A celebrated hip-hop artist (Wood Harris) with a privileged life and a loving family experiences confusing visions, which plague him to the point where the lines separating fantasy and reality start to blur.
27	"Rewind"	Kevin Bray	James Crocker	February 5, 2003	127
A compulsive gambler (Eddie Kaye Thomas) is gifted a cassette recorder with the power to repeatedly send him five minutes back in time, and tries to use it to beat the local casino owner (Ben Bass) and the mob.
28	"Tagged"	James Head	Story by : Charles Largent; Teleplay by : Michael Angeli	February 12, 2003	129
A gang member and street tagger (Todd Williams) becomes consumed with guilt after killing a man he caught painting over his mural and seeing the mural itself transform into a real-life portrait of his crime.
29	"Into the Light"	Lou Diamond Phillips	Moira Kirland Dekker	February 12, 2003	128
A high school English teacher (Samantha Mathis) set on resigning due to a lack of interest from her apathetic students, develops the ability to predict when a person is going to die when she looks at their face.
30	"It's Still a Good Life"	Allan Kroeker	Based on characters created by : Jerome Bixby; Teleplay by : Ira Steven Behr	February 19, 2003	131
In the sequel to It's a Good Life, Anthony Fremont (Bill Mumy), all grown up and still terrorizing the residents of Peaksville with his unlimited mental powers, discovers that his young daughter (Liliana Mumy) has powers that are even stronger than his.
31	"The Monsters Are on Maple Street"	Debbie Allen	Story by : Rod Serling; Teleplay by : Erin Maher & Kay Reindl	February 19, 2003	130
In an updated version of the original series episode The Monsters Are Due on Maple Street, an unexpected power and water failure prompts the residents (Andrew McCarthy, Titus Welliver, Kristi Angus, and Peter Williams) of a quiet suburban neighborhood to grow increasingly suspicious of their new neighbors and accuse them of being terrorist sleeper agents.
32	"Memphis"	Eriq La Salle	Eriq La Salle	February 26, 2003	133
A law clerk (Eriq La Salle) with an inoperable brain tumor who has only six months left to live finds himself transported back in time to Memphis, Tennessee on the day of Martin Luther King Jr.'s assassination.
33	"How Much Do You Love Your Kid?"	Allison Liddi-Brown	Michael Angeli	February 26, 2003	132
A woman (Bonnie Somerville) contemplating divorcing husband (Steve Bacic) discovers that her son has been kidnapped via phone call, and she is forced to participate in a twisted reality game show hosted by Nick Dark (Wayne Knight) to get him back.
34	"The Placebo Effect"	Jerry Levine	Story by : Rebecca Swanson; Teleplay by : Brent V. Friedman	April 2, 2003	134
A medical practitioner (Sydney Tamiia Poitier) attempts to dissuade a hypochondriac (Jeffrey Combs) from believing that he has contracted a virulent disease found in the pages of a science-fiction novel.
35	"Cold Fusion"	Eli Richbourg	Ashley Edward Miller & Zack Stentz	April 2, 2003	135
A brilliant physicist (Sean Patrick Flanery) becomes involved in a deadly psychological struggle with a rival scientist (Ian McShane) after being tasked with taking part in the final preparations for an infinite power source.
36	"The Pharaoh's Curse"	Bob Balaban	Stephen Beck	April 23, 2003	139
An up-and-coming illusionist (Shawn Hatosy) insinuates himself into the lives of a reclusive veteran magician (Xander Berkeley) and his young wife (Lindy Booth) in an attempt to unlock the secrets behind their centuries-old illusion.
37	"The Collection"	John T. Kretchmer	Erin Maher & Kay Reindl	April 23, 2003	138
A babysitter (Jessica Simpson) suspects that a collection of eerily life-like dolls belonging to her latest client's charge (Ashley Edner) is connected to the mysterious disappearances of her previous sitters.
38	"Eye of the Beholder"	David R. Ellis	Rod Serling	April 30, 2003	140
In a retelling of the original series episode Eye of the Beholder, a young woman with a hideous facial deformity (Molly Sims) living in a futuristic totalitarian society waits to learn if the 11th and final attempt to surgically make her look like everyone else is successful or not.
39	"Developing"	Allison Liddi-Brown	Moira Kirland Dekker	April 30, 2003	141
A photographer (Robin Tunney) becomes convinced that her deceased fiancé is attempting to contact her from beyond the grave after finding him in several photographs that never could have been taken.
40	"The Executions of Grady Finch"	John Peter Kousakis	Story by : Frederick Rappaport; Teleplay by : Ira Steven Behr and Brent V. Friedman	May 7, 2003	143
A death row inmate (Jeremy Sisto) sets out to convince his defense attorney (Alicia Witt) that he didn't commit the crime he was convicted of, while an unknown force starts interfering with his executions.
41	"Homecoming"	Risa Bramon Garcia	Story by : Bradley Thompson & David Weddle; Teleplay by : Michael Angeli	May 7, 2003	142
A Delta Force officer (Gil Bellows) recently discharged from combat tries to make amends with his wayward teenage son (Penn Badgley), while also preventing him from unearthing a mysterious secret.
42	"Sunrise"	Tim Matheson	Story by : Katrina Cabrera Ortega; Teleplay by : Frederick Rappaport	May 21, 2003	137
Five college students (Jonathan Jackson, Sarah Carter, Michael Peña, Lauren Lee Smith, and Tyler Labine) exploring an ancient Aztec ritual site struggle to decide whom they must sacrifice after knocking over a jug filled with blood and enacting a curse that causes the sun to go out.
43	"Burned"	John T. Kretchmer	Seth Weisburst & Daniel Wolowicz	May 21, 2003	136
An agoraphobic real estate mogul (Jason Bateman) finds himself being forced to confront the sins of his past when the vindictive ghosts of two young children killed in an arson fire he orchestrated start haunting him.

== Home media ==
The complete series was released on DVD by New Line Home Entertainment in a six disc box set on September 7, 2004. The episodes are presented in their production order, not their broadcast order.

== See also ==
- The Twilight Zone
- The Twilight Zone (1959 TV series)
- The Twilight Zone (1985 TV series)
- The Twilight Zone (2019 TV series)
