= DC Showcase: Catwoman =

2011 film directed by Lauren Montgomery

- Directed by: Lauren Montgomery
- Screenplay by: Paul Dini
- Based on: Catwoman by Bill Finger and Bob Kane
- Produced by: Lauren Montgomery; Alan Burnett
- Starring: Eliza Dushku; John DiMaggio; Liliana Mumy; Kevin Michael Richardson; Tara Strong; Cree Summer
- Music by: Christopher Drake
- Production companies: Warner Premiere; Warner Bros. Animation; DC Entertainment
- Distributed by: Warner Home Video
- Release date: October 18, 2011
- Running time: 15 minutes
- Country: United States
- Language: English

DC Showcase: Catwoman, also titled as simply Catwoman, is a 2011 American animated superhero short film based on the DC Comics character of the same name directed by Lauren Montgomery and written by Paul Dini. It was released on October 18, 2011, as a bonus feature and continuation of the Catwoman story line on Batman: Year One Blu-ray and DVD. It is the fifth installment in the DC Showcase series. The film features Eliza Dushku as Catwoman / Selina Kyle in her first solo tale, as she attempts to bring both a Gotham City crime boss called Rough Cut and his smuggling ring to an end, stumbling upon a mysterious cargo shipment far worse than just smuggled diamonds.

== Plot ==
The film starts with two men pursuing a grey cat in an attempt to shoot it dead. The cat supposedly jumps into the river and is presumed dead. As the two men leave in a limousine with a crime boss called Rough Cut, Catwoman is shown under the bridge with the grey cat, which has a yellow wristband around its neck, grabbing Catwoman's interest.

Later on, Rough Cut is on the phone with a man at the warehouse at the Dixon Docks, who informs Rough Cut that an inbound boat will be docking in twenty minutes. Rought Cut says he has to run an errand and to start loading the ship with freight containers quickly so they can leave port. Rough Cut and his two cohorts go to a strip club called the Kitty Corner. As a woman dances and strips, he gives her a small chunk of diamond. Catwoman enters the strip club and covers for the other stripper women, but this only proves to be a way for her to confront Rough Cut. As every single person has already fled the strip club, Catwoman and Rough Cut are left alone. After a short fight, he escapes before she can get him. Some while later, Catwoman attacks Rough Cut whilst he is driving a craned truck. Catwoman slips the crane hook under the truck and escapes before it crashes, the hook flying over and slicing a ship full of goods in half. The truck overturns and Rough Cut is killed.

When Catwoman goes to the shipping container and opens it, she finds a group of trafficked girls, which is revealed to be the mysterious cargo shipment. Catwoman notices Holly Robinson to be one of the girls. As the police arrive, Selina Kyle comforts Holly, giving her the yellow wristband that belonged to Holly before she was trafficked. Selina also gives Holly a handful of diamonds because she is in need. The film ends with Catwoman jumping from one building to another as Holly watches her disappear into the night.

== Cast ==
DC Showcase: Catwoman stars Eliza Dushku reprising her role as the titular character. Dushku previously played Catwoman in the animated film Batman: Year One.

- Eliza Dushku as Catwoman / Selina Kyle
- John DiMaggio as Rough Cut, Rough Cut Goon (uncredited) and Motorcycle Dude (uncredited)
- Liliana Mumy as Holly Robinson
- Kevin Michael Richardson as Moe
- Tara Strong as Buttermilk Skye
- Cree Summer as Lily

== Critical reception ==
DC Showcase: Catwoman was met with mixed reviews from critics. Jack Brink of Screen Rant described the short as "mature" and filled with "violent and brutal action", noting that it has a 3.2/5 on Letterboxd.
