= Snow Buddies =

- Sales poster
- Directed by: Robert Vince
- Written by: Robert Vince; Anna McRoberts
- Based on: Characters by Paul Tamasy; Aaron Mendelsohn; Kevin DiCicco; Robert Vince; Anna McRoberts
- Produced by: Robert Vince; Anna McRoberts
- Starring: Dominic Scott Kay; John Kapelos; Lise Simms; Mike Dopud; Charles C. Stevenson Jr. Dylan Minnette; Richard Karn; Cynthia Stevenson; Kris Kristofferson; Josh Flitter; Henry Hodges; Liliana Mumy; Jimmy Bennett; Skyler Gisondo; Whoopi Goldberg; Tom Everett Scott; Molly Shannon; Dylan Sprouse; Lothaire Bluteau; Paul Rae; Jim Belushi
- Cinematography: Kamal Derkaoui
- Edited by: Kelly Herron
- Music by: Brahm Wenger
- Production companies: Keystone Entertainment; Key Pix Productions
- Distributed by: Walt Disney Studios Home Entertainment (Note: Released through the Walt Disney Pictures banner.)
- Release date: February 5, 2008
- Running time: 87 minutes
- Country: United States
- Language: English

Snow Buddies is a 2008 American adventure comedy film and the second installment in the Air Buddies series. It was released on DVD by Walt Disney Studios Home Entertainment on February 5, 2008. The film takes place in the fictional town of Ferntiuktuk, Alaska.

It is the final installment in the series to feature Buddy himself as well as any characters from the Air Bud films.

== Plot ==
Air Bud's Golden Retriever puppies (known as the Buddies) from the town of Fernfield, Washington are having fun with their new owners before they go to school. The puppies meet up in the park and decide to play hide and seek. Budderball sees an ice cream truck and decides to go in, forcing the others to try and rescue him, but the Buddies become trapped in a truck heading to Ferntiuktuk, Alaska. Upon arrival, the Buddies meet an Alaskan Husky puppy named Shasta, whose owner, Adam Bilson, is determined to win the Alaskan sled dog race. The puppies decide to help Shasta pursue his dreams as well as get to the airport, located at the finish line. Although Shasta's parents are both dead, and the puppies in a predicament as there is nobody to teach them how to become snow dogs, Shasta manages to persuade a legendary Alaskan Malamute named Talon, who had taught Shasta's father, to teach the puppies.

When Shasta introduces Adam to his new sleigh team, Adam is delighted at the prospect of his dreams finally coming true and the team pursue vigorous training routines. Talon proudly watches as the team's efforts come to fruition and it seems as though they are cooperating as a team. The older town huskies are not impressed and begin to plan their downfall. Two of the huskies, Francois and Philippe, reveal to the Buddies that Shasta's parents were killed during a dog sled race last year when the ice beneath them shattered.

Talon calls the puppies to the mountain lake one night to view the Northern Lights before he goes of telling Shasta that he knows all he needs to know and that he can become the great leader that his father once was; once all the puppies say their goodbyes to him, Talon disappears. The following morning, the puppies enter the race with Adam. Jean George III, an unscrupulous and arrogant French musher and last year's champion, sabotages the other racers, leaving only him and Adam left. A blizzard arrives, but it is too late to call off the race as the racers have already gotten past the midway checkpoint.

The puppies' parents, Buddy and Molly, follow the puppies to Alaska after being tipped by Himalayan cat Miss Mittens, where the Saint Bernard dog Bernie informs them of their participation in the race. Sheriff Ryan gets a message sent by Fernfield's Deputy Dan asking for any information on the Buddies. The Sheriff immediately phones Dan to inform him that the Buddies are in Alaska. The blizzard forces Adam and the team to take shelter in an igloo provided by an Inuk until the storm subsides. They come head to head with Jean George, and Adam gets injured.

Adam then recovers while Francois and Philippe get into trouble when the ice beneath them shatters. Jean George continues and abandons his dogs while Adam and the puppies begin a rescue operation despite Shasta's fears of his parents' death, revealing that they had died from drowning. The puppies pull Francois and Philippe out of the icy waters, while Jean George continues the race and abandons their rescuers. Francois and Philippe realize they owe nothing to their owner for leaving them to die, and everything to Shasta and the Buddies for rescuing them, and so, decide to "go on strike". They stop and refuse to run any further, causing Jean George to lose the race.

Adam is victorious and the Buddies reunite with Buddy and Molly. Jean George scolds his dogs for embarrassing him, and they respond by chasing him around the Arctic. The Buddies say goodbye to their new best friend, Shasta, as well as Adam, and both groups promise that they will stay in touch with each other. All seven Buddies return home via airplane and reunite with their owners. That night, Buddy and Molly sit on the roof of their house and discuss their puppies' accomplishments, while wondering if they will ever outgrow exploring. The film ends with Adam and a now nearly full-grown Shasta hiking through Alaska on a cold, winter night with five new adult huskies.

== Cast ==
=== Live action cast ===
- Dominic Scott Kay as Adam Bilson, Shasta's owner
- John Kapelos as Jean George
- Lise Simms as Meg Bilson, Adam's mother
- Mike Dopud as Joe Bilson, Adam's father
- Richard Karn as Patrick Sullivan, Noah's father and Josh and Andrea's stepfather
- Cynthia Stevenson as Jackie Framm Sullivan, Josh, Andrea and Noah's mother
- Charles C. Stevenson Jr. as Sheriff Ryan
- Dylan Minnette as Noah Sullivan, Jackie and Patrick's son and Buddy's owner
- Christian Pikes as Henry, Noah's best friend and Molly's owner
- Tyler Foden as Bartleby Livingstone, Budderball's owner
- Gig Morton as Billy, B-Dawg's owner
- Jarvis Dashkewytch as Sam, Buddha's owner
- Cainan Wiebe as Pete Howard, Mudbud's owner
- Kelly Chapek as Alice Finch, Rosebud's owner
- Michael Teigen as Deputy Dan

=== Voice cast ===
- Kris Kristofferson as Talon, an Alaskan Malamute
- Josh Flitter as Budderball
- Henry Hodges as Mudbud
- Liliana Mumy as Rosebud
- Jimmy Bennett as Buddha
- Skyler Gisondo as B-Dawg
- Tom Everett Scott as Buddy
- Whoopi Goldberg as Miss Mittens, a Himalayan cat
- Molly Shannon as Molly
- Dylan Sprouse as Shasta, an Alaskan Husky puppy
- Lothaire Bluteau as Francois, Jean George's primary lead husky
- Paul Rae as Phillipe, Jean George's secondary lead husky
- Jim Belushi as Bernie, a St. Bernard

== Production ==
An American Humane Certified Safety Representative visited the Snow Buddies set on the first day of filming. Fifteen Golden Retriever puppies were on set and fifteen others were being treated by a local veterinarian; their illnesses were eventually diagnosed as giardiasis and coccidiosis. On request from the representative, the remaining puppies on set received additional veterinary checks. Twenty-five of the puppies were from an American breeder and five were from a Canadian breeder. It was discovered that the puppies were approximately 8 weeks old, which led to the belief that the puppies were only 6 weeks old when they were brought by the trainer to the film set. Per the USDA, it was at the time illegal to transport puppies under the age of 8 weeks.

After the removal of all 30 puppies, 28 older Golden Retriever puppies were brought in to continue filming. All of the 28 older puppies were exposed to parvovirus. Five of the puppies died, and up to six others fell ill after exposure to the virus.

As a result, the film was not permitted to use the "No animals were harmed..." disclaimer and received an "Unacceptable" marking from the American Humane Society.

== Home media ==
Walt Disney Studios Home Entertainment released the film on Blu-ray on January 31, 2012. The disc comes with bonus features which include a narration by the director on the visual effects and an audio commentary by the Buddies and Shasta. Other features include a music video, bloopers and behind the scenes.

== Reception ==
On Common Sense Media, Nancy Davis Kho gave the film 3/5 stars.
