= The Monsters Are Due on Maple Street =

- The Twilight Zone episode
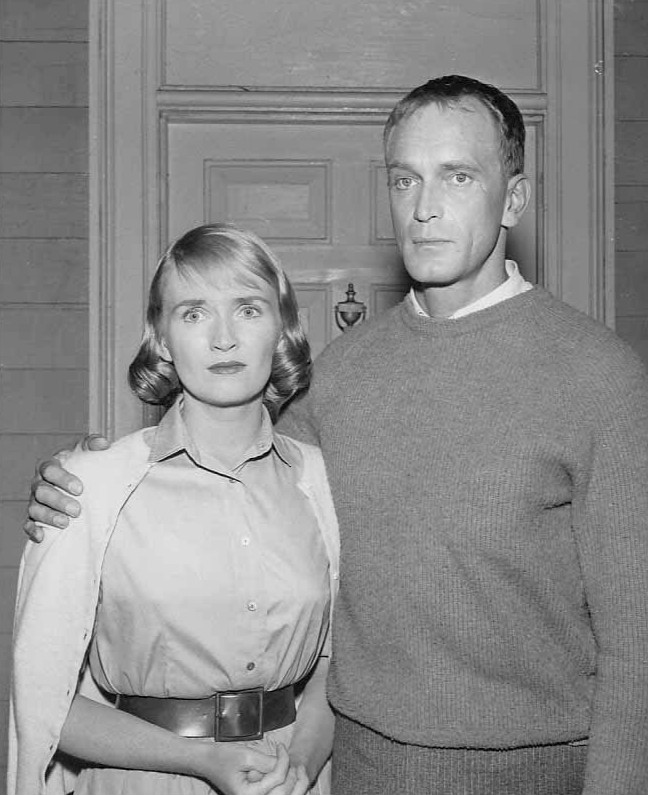
- Lea Waggner and Barry Atwater
- Episode no.: Season 1 Episode 22
- Directed by: Ronald Winston
- Written by: Rod Serling
- Production code: 173-3620
- Original air date: March 4, 1960

Guest appearances
- Claude Akins as Steve Brand; Barry Atwater as Les Goodman; Jack Weston as Charlie; Burt Metcalfe as Don Martin; Amzie Strickland as unnamed neighbor; Anne Barton as Mrs. Brand; Jan Handzlik as Tommy; Mary Gregory as Sally; Lea Waggner as Mrs. Goodman; Ben Erway as Pete Van Horn; Sheldon Allman and Bill Walsh as the real aliens

Episode chronology
| ← Previous "Mirror Image" | Next → "A World of Difference" |
- The Twilight Zone (1959 TV series, season 1)

"The Monsters Are Due on Maple Street" is the 22nd episode in the first season of the American television anthology series The Twilight Zone. The episode was written by Rod Serling, the creator-narrator of the series. It originally aired on March 4, 1960, on CBS. In 2009, TIME named it one of the ten best Twilight Zone episodes.

== Opening narration ==
Maple Street, U.S.A., late summer. A tree-lined little world of front porch gliders, barbecues, the laughter of children, and the bell of an ice cream vendor. At the sound of the roar and the flash of light, it will be precisely 6:43 p.m. on Maple Street.

The narration continues after the neighbors wonder if what flew overhead was a meteor.

This is Maple Street on a late Saturday afternoon. Maple Street in the last calm and reflective moment — before the monsters came.

== Plot ==
One late-summer afternoon, Maple Street is full of children playing and adults talking and doing yard work, when a shadow passes over, accompanied by a roar and a flash of light. Everyone notices, but they assume it is a passing meteor and resume their activities. The residents soon discover that their power went off, affecting stoves, lawnmowers, cars, phones, even portable radios, and they gather in the street to discuss the situation. Pete Van Horn volunteers to walk over to Floral Street, to see if it is affected. His neighbors, Steve Brand and Charlie Farnsworth, decide to go into town to investigate further, but Tommy, a neighborhood boy, urges them not to go. Tommy has read a story of an alien invasion causing similar effects, and says that the monsters do not want anyone to leave the street. Tommy adds that in the story, the aliens are living as a family that appears to be human, but are actually scouts, and the power outage they cause is to isolate the neighborhood. The adults are incredulous, assuring him that the cause is natural.

Another resident, Les Goodman, tries unsuccessfully to start his car. However, after he walks away from the car, it starts on its own. This makes the neighbors suspect that Les may be an alien. As they all gather, one woman brings up Les' late nights spent standing in the garden looking at the sky, as if waiting or looking for something. Les, defending himself as a resident of Maple Street for five years, claims to suffer from insomnia and admonishes his neighbors that they should use caution and not panic. Steve tries to defuse the situation and prevent it from becoming a witch hunt, but tensions remain high.

As darkness descends, Charlie begins keeping watch over Les Goodman's house. Steve suggests Charlie go home to bed. Another neighbor, Don, mentions that Steve has built his own radio set, which Charlie then claims no one has ever seen. As suspicion mounts, Steve's wife protests that it is a simple ham radio, but Steve sarcastically answers that he talks to aliens with it. Steve and the other neighbors continue to argue, using each person's idiosyncrasies as evidence that they are an alien. Steve warns that such behavior, looking for a scapegoat, is the surest way for the entire neighborhood to "eat each other up alive".

A shadowy figure approaches the residents, which Tommy exclaims is the monster. Claiming it may be necessary for protection, Don obtains a double-barrelled shotgun that Steve immediately confiscates. As the figure gets closer, Charlie panics, taking the shotgun and shooting the figure. Upon reaching the fallen figure, they realize it is Pete Van Horn (who had gone to see if Floral Street had power earlier), and is now dead. As Charlie struggles to defend his hasty action, the lights in his house come on spontaneously, provoking the residents into turning on him. Don suspiciously asks Charlie why his power is restored, while Les rebukes him for being so quick to kill and accuse, suggesting that perhaps Pete had found proof of Charlie's extraterrestrial origins, and that the latter shot the former to silence him. Even Steve does not advocate for Charlie, outraged by his senseless murder of Pete. Charlie makes a break for his house; everyone chases him, throwing stones, one of which smashes a porch lantern, causing the broken glass to fly at Charlie's face, cutting his forehead. Terrified, Charlie attempts to deflect suspicion onto Tommy. While his mother is quick to defend him, several neighbors agree with this idea, as Tommy was the only one who knew about the aliens' plans. Steve continues to try to defuse the situation, but no one listens.

Lights begin flashing on and off in houses throughout the neighborhood; lawnmowers and car engines start and stop for no reason. The mob becomes hysterical, hurling accusations, smashing windows, and taking up weapons as the situation devolves into an all-out riot.

Meanwhile, at a nearby hilltop, two humanoid aliens are observing the riot on Maple Street while using a device to manipulate the neighborhood's power. They comment on how simply fiddling with routine leads people to descend into paranoia and panic that can be exploited. They also discuss their intention to use this strategy to conquer Earth, one neighborhood at a time. They then ascend a stairway into their spaceship, which then takes off.

== Closing narration ==
The tools of conquest do not necessarily come with bombs and explosions and fallout. There are weapons that are simply thoughts, attitudes, prejudices ... to be found only in the minds of men. For the record, prejudices can kill, and suspicion can destroy, and a thoughtless, frightened search for a scapegoat has a fallout all of its own ... for the children and the children yet unborn. And the pity of it is, that these things cannot be confined only to The Twilight Zone.

== Production ==
The aliens are wearing uniforms previously worn by characters in the 1956 science fiction film Forbidden Planet. Also, the mockup set of the retractable stairway, leading into the lower half of the C-57D cruiser from the same film, is reused for this scene. At the end of the episode, footage of the alien spaceship was used from Forbidden Planet (1956), only backwards and upside-down.

== 2003 remake ==
A 2003 remake of the episode was produced for the 2002 revival of The Twilight Zone, but it was renamed "The Monsters Are on Maple Street". Serling received "Story By" credit. It starred Andrew McCarthy as Will Marshall and Titus Welliver as Dylan. The difference between the two is that the remake is more about the fear of terrorism. When the power surge happens in the remake, it is caused not by aliens, but instead by the government, specifically the United States Army, experimenting on how small towns react to the fear of terrorism. In the end, the neighborhood takes out its anger and frustration on a family who never left their house after the power surge occurred, thinking that they caused it since they still have power. The residents all fail the test miserably as did all the other inhabitants of every other street they tested.

The opening and closing narration, provided by Forest Whitaker, has also been altered:

Maple Street, U.S.A. Suburban community on a pleasant Saturday afternoon ... but in a few moments everything will change for the residents of Maple Street as they discover that the monsters they fear may already be among them.

With the closing narration being:

It isn't enough for a sole voice of reason to exist. In this time of uncertainty we are so sure that villains lurk around every corner that we will create them ourselves if we can't find them—for while fear may keep us vigilant, it's also fear that tears us apart—a fear that sadly exists only too often — outside the Twilight Zone.

== Other media ==
A radio dramatization of this episode was produced in the mid-2000s as part of The Twilight Zone radio series, starring Frank John Hughes as Steve Brand. It was included in The Twilight Zone: Radio Dramas – Collection 12 collection.

A graphic novel version was published by the Savannah College of Art and Design partnered with Walker & Co. A short-story version was published in Stories from The Twilight Zone and ends with a race of two-headed aliens moving into Maple Street.

The episode served as a major influence on science fiction in the decades that followed. Among the films that drew their inspiration from this episode include The Trigger Effect, directed by David Koepp, and The Mist, directed by Frank Darabont.

== See also ==
- Cold War
- Crowd psychology
- List of television episodes listed among the best
- McCarthyism
- Second Red Scare (1947–1957)
