= Frank C. Turner =

Canadian actor and iconographer (born 1951)

- Born: Francis Charles Turner; June 2, 1951 (age 74); Wainwright, Alberta, Canada
- Occupations: Actor, iconographer
- Years active: 1975–present
- Partner: Jan Turner
- Children: 4

Francis Charles Turner (born June 2, 1951) is a Canadian actor and iconographer born in Wainwright, Alberta and now living in British Columbia. He has appeared in numerous films, made-for-television films, television shows, and plays.

== Biography ==
He received his theatrical training at the University of Alberta, graduating in 1975 with a BFA in acting. For the first few years after graduation he acted in theatres across western Canada and Ontario. In 1983 he moved to Vancouver, BC and has worked mainly in film since then. In 2003 he appeared as George Bernard Shaw in debate with G. K. Chesterton on G. K. CHESTERTON: THE APOSTLE OF COMMON SENSE with EWTN, a performance previously given in Calgary, and St. Paul, Minnesota. In 1991 he began studying iconography under Vladislav Andreyev. A frequent attendee of the Mount Angel Iconography Institute where he studied with Charles Rohrbacher, Mary Katsilometes, Claudia Coos, and Cathy Sievers; more recently he studied in Cottonwood, Idaho with Father Gianluca Busi from Bologna. In 2007, he spent six weeks in Bologna painting and being immersed in Catholic iconography. Along with Chris Kielsinki and Michal Janek, Frank was a founding member of Epiphany Sacred Arts Guild, and served as its president for ten years. He also served on the curriculum advisory board of Living Water College of the Arts. Married in 1976, he has four children.

== Filmography ==
=== Film ===
Year	Title	Role	Notes
1981	Silence of the North	Young Man	
1981	A War Story	Peter Seed	Credited as Frank Turner
1982	The Grey Fox	Hotel Clerk	Credited as Frank Turner
1982	Harry Tracy: Dead or Alive	Eddie Hoyt	
1984	Finders Keepers	Elvis, Railway Waiter	Uncredited
1984	Draw!	Poker Player	TV movie
1985	Certain Fury	Dimitri	Credited as Frank Turner
1985	The Journey of Natty Gann	Farmer	
1985	Into Thin Air	Motel Manager	TV movie
1985	Love Is Never Silent	Mr. Frank	TV movie
1987	A Stranger Waits	Station Attendant	TV movie
1987	Stone Fox	Emil Janssen	TV movie
1987	Malone	Andy	
1988	Deadly Pursuit	Crilly	
1988	The Red Spider	Salvation Army	TV movie
1988	Higher Ground	Jack Simon	TV movie
1988	The People Across the Lake	Eli	TV movie
1988	Watchers	Salesclerk	
1988	Family Reunion	Ticket Agent	
1989	The Experts	Sheriff	
1989	The Fly II	Shepard	Credited as Frank Turner
1989	Dead Bang	Cottonwood Officer	
1989	We're No Angels	Shopkeeper	
1991	And the Sea Will Tell	Kansas Rock	TV movie
1991	The Legend of Kootenai Brown	Emaciated Man	
1991	Bingo	Prison Guard	
1991	Yes Virginia, There Is a Santa Claus	Produce Keeper	TV movie
1992	Miles from Nowhere	Dr. Moranis	TV movie
1992	Knight Moves	Doctor	
1992	Unforgiven	"Fuzzy"	
1992	Shame	Bill Ross	TV movie
1992	Dead Ahead: The Exxon Valdez Disaster	Biologist, State of Alaska	TV movie
1993	This Boy's Life	Truck Driver	
1993	Call of the Wild	Old Timer	TV movie
1993	Another Stakeout	"Unlucky"	
1993	Needful Things	Pete Jerzyck	
1993	Look Who's Talking Now	Dave	Credited as Frank Turner
1993	Ernest Rides Again	Van Driver	
1994	Andre	John Miller	
1994	Crackerjack	Oliver Green	
1994	Incident at Deception Ridge	Homeless Man	TV movie
1994	Flinch	The Coroner	
1995	Johnny's Girl	"Bear"	TV movie
1996	In Cold Blood	Clarence Ewalt	TV movie
1996	The Angel of Pennsylvania Avenue	Hiram Wingate	
1997	Air Bud	The Bailiff	
1997	Northern Lights	Willard	TV movie
1997	The Diary of Evelyn Lau	Minister In Van	TV movie
1997	Tricks	Dr. Olsen	TV movie
1997	Mr. Magoo	Ralston, The Stage Manager	
1998	Goldrush: A Real Life Alaskan Adventure	Pratt	TV movie
1998	Air Bud: Golden Receiver	Official	
1998	Rupert's Land	Hunter	
1999	Snow Falling on Cedars	Juror	
1999	The Duke	Parsnip	
2000	Navigating the Heart	Alan	TV movie
2000	Mr. Rice's Secret	Thin Man	
2000	Beautiful Joe	Frank	
2000	MVP: Most Valuable Primate	Bart	
2000	High Noon	Station Master	TV movie
2000	Christy: Return to Cutter Gap	Ozias Holt	TV movie
2000	By Dawn's Early Light	Doctor	TV movie
2001	Black River	Farmer	TV movie
2001	3000 Miles to Graceland	Impound Shop Man	
2001	Cats & Dogs	The Farmer	
2001	Air Bud: World Pup	Referee #2	
2002	Snow Dogs	Neely	
2002	Air Bud: Seventh Inning Fetch	Carlton	
2002	Try Seventeen	The Custodian	
2002	Killer Bees!	Skinny Farmer	TV movie
2003	Scary Movie 3	Mr. Meek's Brother	
2004	Love on the Side	Wilbur	
2005	Are We There Yet?	Amish Man	
2005	Alone in the Dark	Sam Fischer	
2005	Missing in America	"Dinky"	
2005	The Big White	Dave	
2005	The Engagement Ring	Abe, In The Present	TV movie
2007	Kickin' It Old Skool	Carl, The Crazy Homeless Man	
2007	Post Mortem	The Photographer	
2007	Hot Rod	The Fisherman	
2009	2012	Preacher	
2010	Mea Maxima Culpa	The Master	Short film
2011	Crash Site	Terrence	
2011	Spooky Buddies	Sheriff Jim	
2011	Good Morning, Killer	Willie John Black	TV movie
2012	Diary of a Wimpy Kid: Dog Days	Troop Master Barrett	
2013	Letter to a Priest	Father Boniface	Short film based on the book of the same name by French philosopher Simone Weil
2015	The Driftless Area	Vacuum Salesman	
2015	Accidental Obsession	Bill	TV movie
2015	My One Christmas Wish	Homeless Man	TV movie
2016	Warcraft	Prizon Mage #2	
2020	Sonic the Hedgehog	Crazy Carl	
2021	Pennywise: The Story of It	Himself	Documentary film

=== Television ===
Year	Title	Role	Notes
1980–1982	Harriet's Magic Hats	Ralph the Parrot	Seasons 1 and 2
1986	Danger Bay	Mr. Shepherd	Episode: "Fish Forgery"
1986	Walt Disney's Wonderful World of Color	Sad Sack Santa	Episode: "The Christmas Star"
1987	Deadly Nightmares	Old Billy Baltimore	Episode: "The Legendary Billy B."; credited as Frank Turner
1987	Airwolf	Cully	Episode: "Flowers of the Mountain"
1988	Earth Star Voyager	Willy	TV mini-series
1988	21 Jump Street	"Cherry"	Episode: "Cory and Dean Got Married"
1989	The Ray Bradbury Theatre	John Webley	Episode: "Hail and Farewell"
1989	The Ray Bradbury Theatre	Roger Willis	Episode: "Boys! Raise Giant Mushrooms in Your Cellar!"
1989	Booker	Bum	Episode: "Someone Stole Lucille"
1990	Mom P.I.	"Goggles"	Episode: "Gumshoe"
1987–1990	Wiseguy	Reverend Adams / Manager	5 episodes
1987–1990	MacGyver	News / Milt Bozer / Priest	Episodes: "MacGyver's Women" (News), "Halloween Knights" (Milt Bozer), and "Back from the Dead" (Priest)
1990	It	Al Marsh	TV miniseries
1991	Palace Guard	Unknown	Episode: "Simian Enchanted Evening"
1992	Street Justice	Homeless Man	Episode: "Feet of Clay"
1992	The Commish	Fred Phillips	Episode: "The Frame"
1994	The X-Files	Dr. Del Hakkie / Dr. Collins	Episodes: "Duane Barry" (Hakkie) and "Tooms" (Collins)
1993–1994	Highlander	Official / Harry	Episodes: "Shadows" (Official) and "The Darkness" (Harry)
1995	Sliders	Kenny "Crazy Kenny" / Senator Candidate	Episode: "Pilot"
1995–1996	Lonesome Dove: The Outlaw Years	Unbob Finch	Recurring (season 2); 14 episodes Nominated – Gemini Award for Best Performance by an Actor in a Guest Role in a Dramatic Series
1996	The Sentinel	Brother Frederick	Episode: "Vow of Silence"
1996	Poltergeist: The Legacy	Reverend Josiah Blood	Episode: "Thirteenth Generation"
1998	Dead Man's Gun	Roscow Knowls	Episode: "Stage Coach Marty"
1998	The Adventures of Shirley Holmes	Harvey Millstone	Episode: "The Case of the Golden Cave"
1999	Nothing Too Good for a Cowboy	Jack Kroger	Episode: "Charades"
1999	The Net	Matt Joad	Episode: "Chem Lab"
1999	The New Addams Family	Geezer	Episode: "Addams Family Feud"
2000	Call of the Wild	Frank Palmer / Miner / Frak Palmer	8 episodes
2000	Honey, I Shrunk the Kids: The TV Show	Cowpoke #1	Episode: "Honey, I'm Spooked"
2000	Hollywood Off-Ramp	Unknown	Episode: "Cell Phone"
2001	Mysterious Ways	Manager	Episode: "Wonderful"
1995–2001	The Outer Limits	Old Man / Mikulak / Elder / Luther	Episodes: "Rule of Law" (Old Man), "Desent" (Mikulak), "The Camp" (Elder), and "If These Walls Could Talk" (Luther)
2001	Stargate SG-1	Homeless Man	Episode: "Desperate Measures"
2002	Wolf Lake	Drycleaner Owner	Episode: "If These Wolves Could Talk"
2002	The Chris Isaak Show	Farmer	Episode: "Farm Boys"
2004	Kingdom Hospital	Store Keeper	Episode; "Finale"
2004	Dead Like Me	Arthur "Montana" Simms	Episode: "Ashes to Ashes"
2004	Earthsea	Farmer	TV mini-series
2004–2005	Andromeda	Prieus	Episodes: "The Test" and "Phear Phactor Phenom"
2002–2005	Smallville	The Mechanic / Eddie Cole	Episodes: "Ageless" (Mechanic) and "Obscura" (Eddie Cole)
2007	The 4400	Stewart Hanley	Episode: "The Marked"
2008	The Guard	Grimsby	Episode: "Waheguru"
2008	The Guard	Restaurant Guy	Episodes: "Coming Through Fog"
2009	Theater of the Word, Inc.	Israel Gow	Episode: "The Honor of Israel Gow"
2009	G.K. Chesterton: The Apostle of Common Sense	Professor Thaddeus Gorgonus	Episodes: "The Problem of Evil"
2009	G.K. Chesterton: The Apostle of Common Sense	Michael	Episodes: "The Exception Proves the Rule"
2011	Supernatural	Elkins	Episode: "Frontierland"
2013	Arctic Air	Hoover Fitzgerald	Episode: "There's Gold in Them Thar Hills"
2013–2014	Spooksville	The Mayor	Recurring role; 3 episodes Leo Award for Best Performance in a Youth or Children's Program or Series
2014	Strange Empire	Reverend Titus Leach	Episode: "The Hunting Party"
2014	Strange Empire	Titus Lynch	Episode: "Lonely Hearts"
2015	The Man in the High Castle	Jim McCarthy	Episodes: "A Way Out" and "Kindness"
2016	Legends of Tomorrow	Ancient Prisoner	Episode: "Fail-Safe"
