= Audard =

Audard is a surname. Notable people with the surname include:

- Fabien Audard (born 1978), French footballer
- Jean Audard (1913–1998), French poet and critic
