= The Iliad or the Poem of Force =

1939 essay by Simone Weil

"The Iliad, or The Poem of Force" (French: L'Iliade ou le poème de la force) is a 24-page essay written in 1939 by Simone Weil. The essay is about Homer's epic poem the Iliad and contains reflections on the conclusions one can draw from the epic regarding the nature of force in human affairs.

Weil's work was first published in 1940 under the title L'Iliade ou le poème de la force in Les Cahiers du Sud. Cahiers has been described as the only significant literary magazine available in the French free zone when the essay was first released. The first English translation was done by Mary McCarthy and published in the New York–based journal Politics in 1945. The essay has since been republished many times. As of 2007, it was the only one of Weil's writings on ancient Greek literature to be commonly used in university courses on the Classics.

== Synopsis ==
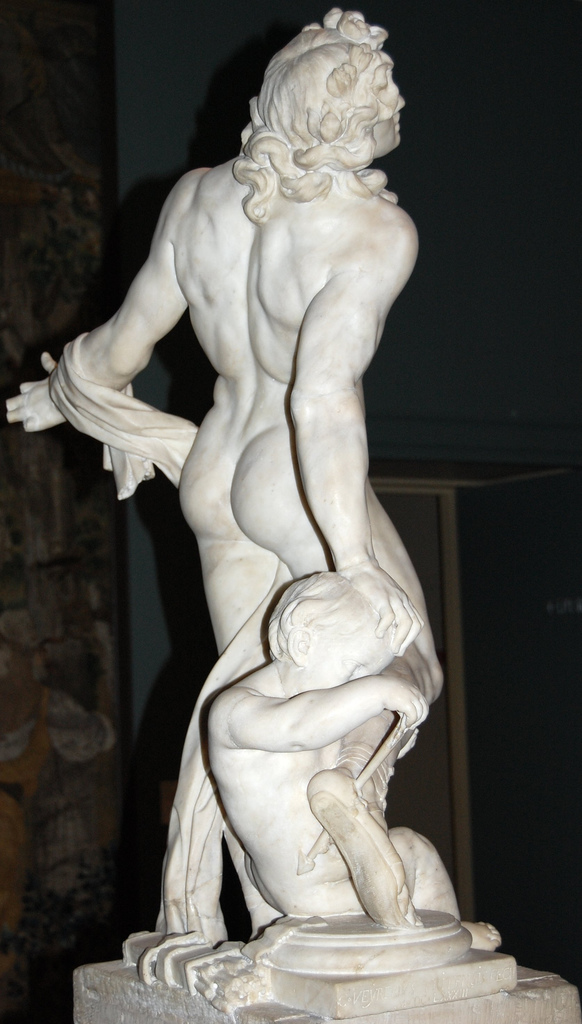
Achilles, the most formidable warrior of the age, shown here with the fatal arrow wound he suffered during the siege of Troy.

Weil introduces the central theme of her essay in the first three sentences:

The true hero, the true subject, the centre of the Iliad, is force. Force employed by man, force that enslaves man, force before which man's flesh shrinks away. In this work, at all times, the human spirit is shown as modified by its relations with force, as swept away, blinded, by the very force it imagined it could handle, as deformed by the weight of the force it submits to.

She proceeds to define force as that which turns anyone subjected to it into a thing – at worst, into a corpse. Weil discusses the emotional and psychological violence one suffers if forced to submit to force even when not physically hurt, holding up the slave and the supplicant as examples. She goes on to say force is dangerous not just to the victim, but to whoever controls it, as it intoxicates, partly by numbing the senses of reason and pity. Force thus can turn even its possessor into a thing – an unthinking automaton driven by rage or lust. The essay relates how the Iliad suggests that no one truly controls force; as everyone in the poem, even the mighty Achilles and Agamemnon, suffer at least briefly when the force of events turns against them. Weil says only by using force in moderation can one escape its ill effects, but that the restraint to do this is very rarely found, and is only a means of temporary escape from force's inevitable heft.

The author offers a number of reasons why she considers the Iliad to be a work unsurpassed in the Western canon. She admires its honesty in describing the realities of war. She relates how the poem covers all the different types of human love – the love between parents and children, fraternal love, the love between comrades and erotic love – though the moments when love directly appears in the poem are very brief and act as counter points to the otherwise unrelenting tragedy and violence. Yet in the last few pages of her essay Weil states that the influence of love is always at work in the epic, in the ever present bitter tone that "proceeds from tenderness": "Justice and love, which have hardly any place in this study of extremes and of unjust acts of violence, nevertheless bathe the work in their light without ever becoming noticeable themselves, except as a kind of accent."

At the end of her essay Weil discusses the sense of equity in which the suffering of combatants from both sides, Trojan and Greek, of whatever rank or degree of heroism, are treated in the same bitter and unscornful way. Weil says this degree of equity was never equalled in any other Western work, though to some degree it was transmitted via the Attic tragedies, especially those of Aeschylus and Sophocles, to the Gospels. But since the Gospels Weil finds that very few authors have begun to approach this sense of universal compassion, though she picks out Shakespeare, Villon, Molière, Cervantes and Racine as coming nearer than most in some of their work.

== Reception ==
The New York Review of Books says the essay is one of Weil's most celebrated works. The Atlantic Monthly has written that, along with Rachel Bespaloff's On the Iliad, Weil's essay "remains the twentieth century's most beloved, tortured, and profound responses to the world's greatest and most disturbing poem."

Simone Petrement, a friend of Weil, wrote that the essay showed a new light in which the Iliad could be viewed. Whereas previously the Iliad had often been regarded as a stirring tale of heroic deeds, after the essay it could be seen as an accurate and compassionate depiction of how both victors and victims are harmed by the use of force. The essay contains several extracts from the epic which Weil translated herself from the original Greek; Petrement records how Weil took over half an hour per line, succeeding in capturing the sense of sympathy and compassion that pervades Homer's work better than any previous translator.

Elizabeth Hardwick described the essay as "one of the most moving and original literary essays ever written." The title of the first chapter of Piero Boitani's A New Sublime: Ten Timeless Lessons on the Classics, "The Poem of Strength and Pity," echoes the title of Weil's essay, reflecting the lasting influence of her ideas in the contemporary scene.
