= Sobornost =

Concept of the need for co-operation between people

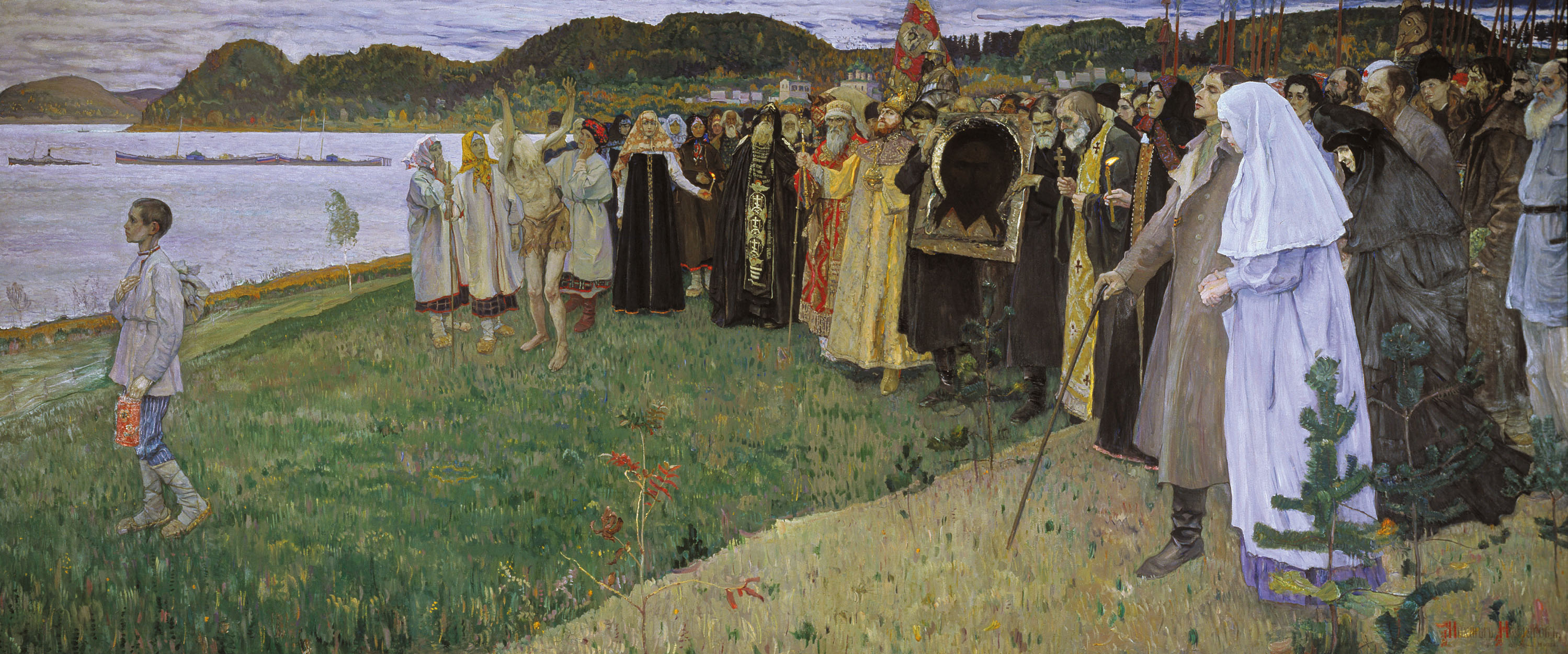
Mikhail Nesterov: In Russia. The Soul of the People (1914). Tretyakov Gallery, Moscow.

Sobornost (Russian: собо́рность, IPA: [sɐˈbornəstʲ] "spiritual community of many jointly-living people") is a Russian term whose usage is primarily attributed to the 19th-century Slavophile Russian writers Ivan Kireyevsky (1806–1856) and Aleksey Khomyakov (1804–1860). The term expresses the need for co-operation between people at the expense of individualism, on the basis that opposing groups focus on what is common between them. Khomyakov believed that the Western world was progressively losing its unity because it was embracing Aristotle and his defining individualism. Kireyevsky believed that G. W. F. Hegel and Aristotle represented the same ideal of unity.

Khomyakov and Kireyevsky originally used the term sobor (Russian: собор) to designate co-operation within the Russian obshchina, united by a set of common convictions and Eastern Orthodox values, as opposed to the cult of individualism in the West. The term sobor in Russian has multiple co-related meanings: a sobor is the diocesan bishop's "cathedral church"; a sobor is also a churchly "gathering", "assemblage", or "council", reflecting the concept of the Christian Church as an "ecclesia" (Greek: ἐκκλησία); secular civil Russian historical usage has the "Zemsky Sobor" (a national assembly) and various local (местное), landed or urban "sobors". Sobornost as an abstract noun formed on the basis of sobor thus literally means something like "gathering-ness" or "assembly-ness".

Khomyakov's concept of the "catholicity" of the Christian Church as "universality", in contrast to that of Rome, reflects the perspective from the root-meaning of the word "liturgy" (Greek: λειτουργία), meaning "work of the gathered people".

== Philosophy ==
As a philosophical term, it was used by Nikolai Lossky and other 20th-century Russian thinkers to refer to a middle way of co-operation between several opposing ideas. It was based on Hegel's "dialectic triad" (thesis, antithesis, synthesis), but in Russian philosophy, it would be considered an oversimplification of Hegel. It influenced both Khomyakov and Kireyevsky, who expressed the idea as organic or spontaneous order.

The synthesis is the point in which sobornost is reached causing change. Hegel's formula is the basis for historicism. Lossky, for example, uses the term to explain what motive would be behind people working together for a common, historical or social goal rather than pursuing the goal individualistically. Lossky used it almost as a mechanical term to define when the dichotomy or duality of a conflict is transcended or how it is transcended and likened it to the final by product after Plato's Metaxy.

Slavophile ideas of sobornost made a profound impact on several Russian thinkers at the verge of the 19th and the 20th century, but in the strict sense of the word, they cannot be placed among direct successors of the Slavophile line. Vladimir Solovyov (1853–1900) developed the idea of vseedinstvo, unity-of-all, a concept similar to that of sobornost and closely connected with his doctrine of Godmanhood. Solovyov characterized the essence of the approach in this way: "Recognizing the final goal of history as the full realization of the Christian ideal in life by all humanity... we understand the all-sided development of culture as a general and necessary means for reaching that goal, for this culture in its gradual progress destroys all those hostile partitions and exclusive isolations between various parts of humanity and the world and tries to unify all natural and social groups in a family that is infinitely diverse in make-up but characterized by moral solidarity".

The term appeared again in the works of Solovyov's follower Sergei Nikolaevich Trubetskoy (1862–1905). In Trubetskoy's interpretation, sobornost means a combination of the religious, moral and social element, as an alternative to individualism and socialist collectivism. In Trubetskoy's works, the idea of sobornost quite clearly becomes part of the solidarity and altruism discourse. In one of his major works, On the Nature of Human Consciousness, Trubetskoy wrote, "Good will, which is the basis of morality, is called love. Any morals, based on principles other than love, are not true morals…. Natural love is inherent to all living beings. Descending from its supreme manifestations in the family love of man, from animal herd instincts to elementary propagation processes, everywhere we find that basic, organic altruism, owing to which creatures inwardly presuppose each other, are drawn towards other creatures and establish not only themselves, but other creatures as well, and live for others".

== Religion ==
Kireyevsky asserted that "the sum total of all Christians of all ages, past and present, comprise one indivisible, eternal living assembly of the faithful, held together just as much by the unity of consciousness as through the communion of prayer". The term, in general, means the unity, togetherness that is the church, based on individual like-minded interest.

Starting with Solovyov, sobornost was regarded as the basis for the ecumenical movement within the Russian Orthodox Church. Sergei Bulgakov, Nikolai Berdyaev and Pavel Florensky were notable proponents for the spirit of sobornost between different Christian factions. The Pochvennichestvo perspective of sobornost held that it means determining the content of the truth and conforming one's beliefs to it as opposed to holding that truth is subjective to individuals and/or that there are no facts but rather only perspectives or points of view.

== Quotes ==
Lossky explained that sobornost involved:

... the combination of freedom and unity of many persons on the basis of their common love for the same absolute values.

Semyon Frank (1877–1950) distinguished three forms of sobornost:

1. A conjugal-family unity based on love.

2. Sobornost in religious life as a communion through a common attitude towards this or that spiritual value. In the given context sobornost can be considered a counterpart of solidarity on the basis of joint service and a common belief.

3. Sobornost in the life of a certain multitude of people sharing a common fate – above all, a common past and common cultural and historical traditions.

== Concept ==
Sobornost is in contrast to the idea of fraternity, which is a submission to a brotherhood as a benefit to the individual. Sobornost is an asceticism akin to kenosis in that the individual gives up self-benefit for the community or ecclesia and is driven by theophilos rather than adelfikos. As is expressed by Kireyevsky's definition of sobornost: "The wholeness of society, combined with the personal independence and the individual diversity of the citizens, is possible only on the condition of a free subordination of separate persons to absolute values and in their free creativeness founded on love of the whole, love of the Church, love of their nation and state, and so on.

== In popular culture ==
In Hannu Rajaniemi's Jean le Flambeur series, the Sobornost is a collective of uploaded minds.

== See also ==
- Byzantism
- Charity (practice)
- Collectivism and individualism
- Communitarianism
- Distributism
- Ecumenism
- Fellowship of Saint Alban and Saint Sergius, publisher of periodical Sobornost
- Flow (psychology)
- George Kline
- Metaxy
- Narodnik
- Pochvennichestvo
- Poshlost in contrast to sobornost
- Russian philosophy
- Sobor
- Sobornost (journal)
- Spontaneous order
- Stoglavy Sobor
- Synergy
