= Simone Weil =

French philosopher (1909–1943)

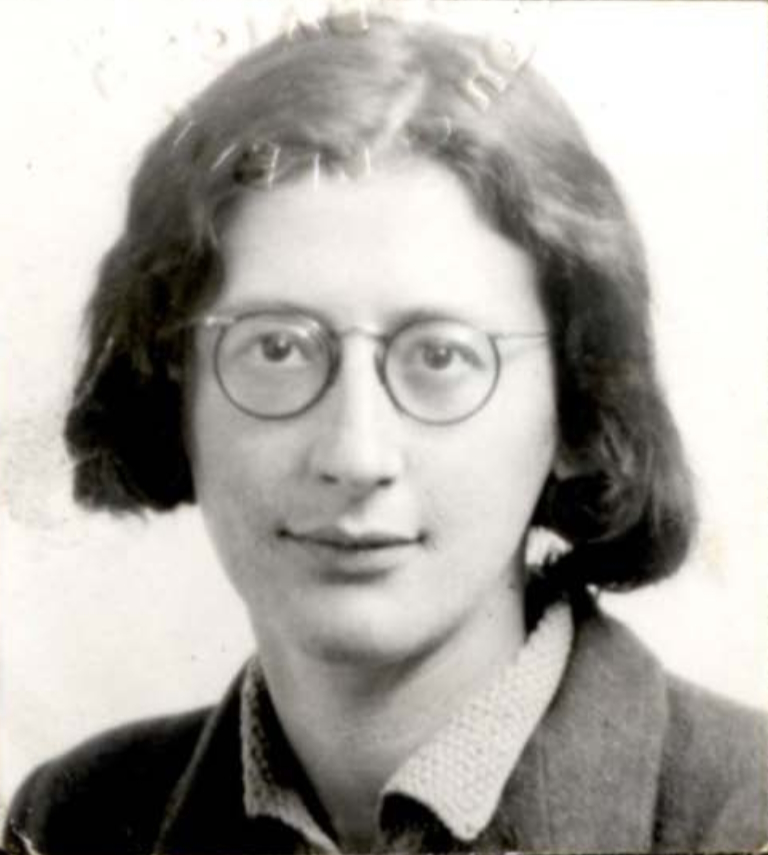
- Weil in 1943
- Born: Simone Adolphine Weil; 3 February 1909; Paris, France
- Died: 24 August 1943 (aged 34); Ashford, Kent, England
- Political party: CCD (1932–1934); CVIA (1934–1936)

Education
- Education: École Normale Supérieure (BA, MA)
- Academic advisors: Alain; Léon Brunschvicg

Philosophical work
- Era: 20th-century philosophy
- Region: Western philosophy: French philosophy
- School: Continental philosophy Marxism (early); Christian anarchism Christian socialism (late); Christian mysticism Modern Platonism
- Main interests: Political philosophy, philosophy of religion, philosophy of science
- Notable works: The Need for Roots
- Notable ideas: Decreation, uprootedness, patriotism of compassion, abolition of political parties, the unjust character of affliction, metaxu

Simone Adolphine Weil (/veɪ/; French: [simɔn adɔlfin vɛj]; 3 February 1909 – 24 August 1943) was a French philosopher, mystic, political activist and labourer. Despite her short life, her ideas concerning religion, spirituality and politics have remained widely influential in contemporary philosophy.

She was born in Paris to an Alsatian Jewish family. Her elder brother, André, would later become a renowned mathematician. After her graduation from formal education, Weil became a teacher. She taught intermittently throughout the 1930s, taking several breaks because of poor health and in order to devote herself to political activism. She assisted in the trade union movement, taking the side of the anarchists known as the Durruti Column in the Spanish Civil War. During a twelve-month period she worked as a labourer, mostly in car factories, so that she could better understand the working class.

Weil was very attracted to the ascetic egalitarian elements of Christianity, and became increasingly religious and inclined towards mysticism as her life progressed. She died of heart failure in 1943, while working for the Free French government in exile in Britain. Her uncompromising personal ethics may have contributed to her death—she had restricted her food intake in solidarity with the inhabitants of Nazi-occupied France.

Weil wrote throughout her life, although most of her writings did not attract much attention until after her death. In the 1950s and '60s, her work became famous in continental Europe and throughout the English-speaking world. Her philosophy and theological thought has continued to be the subject of extensive scholarship across a wide range of fields, covering politics, society, feminism, science, education and classics.

== Early life ==
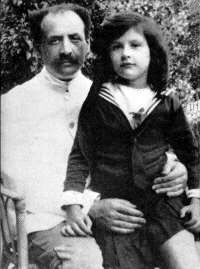
Weil with her father

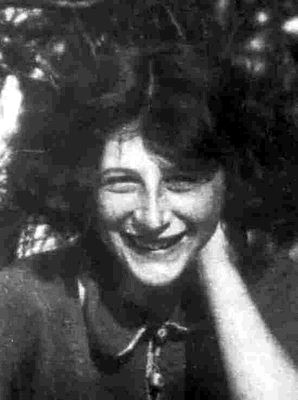
Weil at age 13, during a family holiday to Belgium.

Weil was born in her parents' apartment in Paris on 3 February 1909, the daughter of Bernard Weil (1872–1955), a medical doctor from an agnostic Alsatian Jewish background who moved to Paris after the German annexation of Alsace–Lorraine, and Salomea "Selma" Reinherz (1879–1965), who was born into a Jewish family in Rostov-on-Don and raised in Belgium. According to Osmo Pekonen, "the family name Weil came to be when many Levis in the Napoleonic era changed their names this way, by anagram." Weil was a healthy baby for her first six months, but then suffered a severe attack of appendicitis; thereafter, she struggled with poor health throughout her life. Weil's parents were fairly affluent and raised their children in an attentive and supportive atmosphere. She was the younger of her parents' two children. Her brother was the mathematician André Weil (1906–1998), with whom she would always enjoy a close relationship.

Weil was distressed by her father having to leave home for several years after being drafted to serve in the First World War. Eva Fogelman, Robert Coles and several other scholars believe that this experience may have contributed to the exceptionally strong altruism which Weil displayed throughout her life. For example, a young Weil sent her share of sugar and chocolate to soldiers fighting at the front. When Weil was 10 she joined striking workers chanting L'Internationale marching on the street below her apartment. When visiting a resort with her family and learning of the wages of the workers she encouraged the workers to unionize.

From her childhood home, Weil acquired an obsession with cleanliness; in her later life she would sometimes speak of her "disgustingness" and think that others would see her this way, even though in her youth she had been considered highly attractive. Weil was generally highly affectionate, but she almost always avoided any form of physical contact, even with female friends.

Weil's mother stated that her daughter much preferred boys to girls and that she always did her best to teach her daughter what she believed were masculine virtues. According to her friend and biographer, the philosopher Simone Pétrement, Weil decided early in life that she would need to adopt masculine qualities and sacrifice opportunities for love affairs in order to fully pursue her vocation to improve social conditions for the disadvantaged. From her late teenage years, Weil would generally disguise her "fragile beauty" by adopting a masculine appearance, hardly ever using makeup and often wearing men's clothes. Both Weil's parents referred to her as "our son number two", at the request of Weil and in letters to her parents while a student, she used the masculine form of French participles and signed her name the masculine "Simon".

== Academic studies ==
Weil was a precocious student and was proficient in Ancient Greek by age 12, as she and her brother André had taught themselves Ancient Greek and used it to speak to each other when they did not want their parents to understand what they were saying. She later learned Sanskrit so that she could read the Bhagavad Gita in the original.

As a teenager, Weil studied at the Lycée Henri IV under the tutelage of her admired teacher Émile Chartier, more commonly known as "Alain".

Weil attracted much attention at the Lycée Henri IV with her radical opinions and actions such as organising against the military draft. For these reasons she was called the "Red Virgin", and even "The Martian" by her mentor. Weil gained a reputation for her strict devotion to ethics, with classmates referring to her as the "categorical imperative in skirts". Officials at the school were outraged by her indifference to clothing, her refusal to participate in their traditions, and her ignoring a rule banning women from smoking with male students, for which she was suspended.

At ENS, Weil briefly met Simone de Beauvoir, and their meeting led to disagreement. To Weil's statement that "one thing alone mattered in the world today: the revolution that would feed all people on earth", the young Beauvoir replied that the point of life was to find meaning, not happiness. Weil cut her off, saying, "it's easy to see you've never gone hungry".

Weil finished first in the exam for the certificate of "General Philosophy and Logic" with Simone de Beauvoir finishing second, ahead of the 28 other students, all male. In 1931, Weil earned her DES (diplôme d'études supérieures, roughly equivalent to an M.A.), with a thesis titled, "Science et perception dans Descartes" ("Science and Perception in Descartes") under the supervision of Léon Brunschvicg. She received her agrégation that same year.

== Work and political activism ==
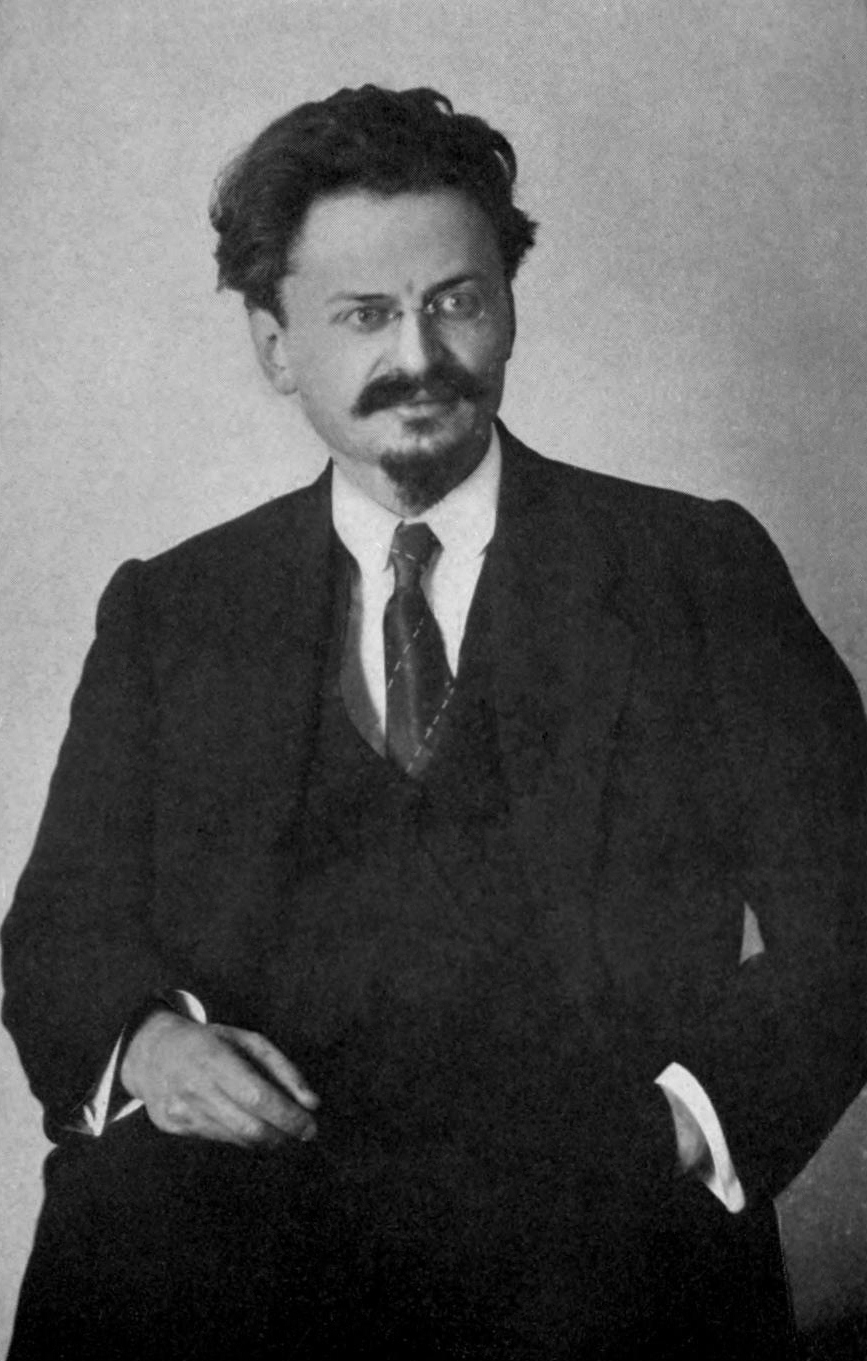
Leon Trotsky, for whom Weil arranged a period of residence at her parents' apartment in Paris in December 1933. Weil was one of the rare few who appeared to hold her own with the Red Army founder.

She often became involved in political action out of sympathy with the working class. In 1915, when she was only six years old, she refused sugar and chocolate in solidarity with the troops entrenched along the Western Front. In 1919, at 10 years of age, she declared herself a Bolshevik. In her late teens, she became involved in the workers' movement. She wrote political tracts, marched in demonstrations and advocated workers' rights. At this time, she was a Marxist, pacifist and trade unionist.

=== Teaching in Le Puy ===
While teaching in Le Puy, she became involved in local political activity, supporting local striking workers underpaid by the City Council. Weil joined protest marches with them and even shared wine with them, facing criticism from local elites and an antisemitic attack in a local paper. When the school director called Weil in for questioning, students and coworkers rallied behind her and ultimately the city council raised the pay of the workers. Weil often held classes outdoors, often refused to share grades with school leadership, and is said to have created a "family atmosphere". She also traveled weekly to Saint-Étienne to teach workers French literature, believing literature could be a tool for revolution and give workers ownership over their heritage and revolution.

=== Factory work and travels ===
Weil began to feel her work was too narrow and elite, telling her students it was an error to "reason in place of finding out" and that philosophy was a matter of action based in truth and that truth must be based in something (something lived or experienced). This led Weil to leave Le Puy to work in factories and perform the repetitive, machine-like work that underlay her definition of le malheur (affliction), saying that workers were reduced to a machine-like existence, where they could not consider rebellion.

Weil never formally joined the French Communist Party, and in her twenties she became increasingly critical of Marxism. According to Pétrement, she was one of the first to identify a new form of oppression not anticipated by Marx, where élite bureaucrats could make life just as miserable for ordinary people as did the most exploitative capitalists. Weil critiqued Marxist theorists, stating "they themselves have never been cogs in the machinery of factory". Weil also doubted aspects of revolution, stating revolution is a word for "which you kill, for which you die, for which you send the laboring masses to their death, but which does not possess any content". Weil felt oppression was not limited to any particular division of labor, but flows from la puissance or power, which affects all people.

In 1932, Weil visited Germany to help Marxist activists, who were at the time considered to be the strongest and best organised communists in Western Europe, but Weil considered them no match for the up-and-coming fascists. When she returned to France, her political friends there dismissed her fears, thinking Germany would continue to be controlled by the centrists or by those to the left. After Hitler rose to power in the beginning of 1933, Weil spent much of her time trying to help German communists fleeing his regime. Weil would sometimes publish articles about social and economic issues, including "Oppression and Liberty," as well as numerous short articles for trade union journals. This work criticised popular Marxist thought and gave a pessimistic account of the limits of both capitalism and socialism. The work however uses a Marxist method of analysis: paying attention to oppression, critiquing Weil's own position as an intellectual, and advances both manual labor and theory and practice. Leon Trotsky personally responded to several of her articles, attacking both her ideas and her as a person. However, according to Pétrement, he was influenced by some of Weil's thought.

In 1933, Weil was dismissed from a teaching job in Auxerre and transferred to Roanne. Weil participated in the French general strike of 1933, called to protest against unemployment and wage cuts. The following year, she took a 12-month leave of absence from her teaching position to work incognito as a labourer in two factories, one owned by Alstom and one by Renault, believing that this experience would allow her to connect with the working class.

In 1935, she began teaching in Bourges and started Entre Nous, a journal that was produced and written by factory workers. Weil donated most of her income to political causes and charitable endeavours.

=== Participation in Spanish Civil War ===
Weil participated in the 1936 Paris factory occupations and planned on returning to factory work, but became focused on the Spanish Civil War. Despite her professed pacifism, she travelled to Spain to join the Republican faction. She identified as an anarchist and sought out the anti-fascist commander Julián Gorkin, asking to be sent on a mission as a covert agent to rescue the prisoner Joaquín Maurín. Gorkin refused, saying Weil would be sacrificing herself for nothing, since it was highly unlikely that she could pass as a Spaniard. Weil replied that she had "every right" to sacrifice herself if she chose, but after arguing for more than an hour, she was unable to convince Gorkin to give her the assignment. Instead she joined the French-speaking Sébastien Faure Century of the anarchist Durruti Column, which specialised in high-risk "commando"-style engagements.

As she was extremely nearsighted, Weil was a very poor shot. Her comrades tried to avoid taking her on missions, though she did sometimes insist. Her only direct participation in combat was to shoot with her rifle at a bomber during an air raid; in a second raid, she tried to operate the group's heavy machine gun, but her comrades prevented her, as they thought it would be best for someone less clumsy and near-sighted to use the weapon. After being with the group for a few weeks, Simone Weil severely burned herself by stepping into a boiling pot of cooking oil.

She was forced to leave the unit and was met by her parents, who had followed her to Spain. They helped her leave the country, to recuperate in Assisi. About a month after Weil departed, her former unit was nearly wiped out at an engagement in Perdiguera in October 1936, with every woman in the group being killed. During her stay in the Aragon front, Weil sent some chronicles to the French publication Le Libertaire. On returning to Paris, she continued to write essays on labour, on management, war and peace.

Weil was distressed by the Republican killings in eastern Spain, particularly when a fifteen-year-old Falangist was executed after he had been taken prisoner. Durruti had spent an hour trying to persuade him to change his political position before giving him until the next day to decide. Weil was deeply concerned by the intoxication of war, where humans learn they can kill without punishment, stating "I was horrified, but not surprised by the war crimes. I felt the possibility of doing the same - and it's precisely because I felt I had that potential that I was horrified."

=== Marseille ===
After the rise of Nazi Germany, Weil renounced pacifism. She said that, "non-violence is good only if it's effective," and she became committed to fighting the Nazi regime, even if it required force. After German attacks on France, Weil left Paris with her family and fled to Marseille. Weil began the risky work of delivering the Cahiers du témoignage, a resistance paper. The resistance group of which Weil was part was infiltrated by informants, and Weil was questioned by the police. When the police threatened to jail her "with the whores" if she did not give them information, Weil stated she would welcome the invitation to be jailed. Weil was ultimately never arrested. Marseille is also where Weil would soon develop significant religious relationships, receiving spiritual direction from Fr. Joseph-Marie Perrin, a Dominican Friar. Weil met the French Catholic author Gustave Thibon, who owned a farm in the Ardèche region where Weil would later work the grape harvest. Thibon later edited some of her work, helping to draw attention to her spiritually related thought in the English-speaking world. Weil encouraged her parents to buy a farm in the Ardèche where they could sustain themselves and work, but Weil's family thought it safer to plan to move to the United States.

== Encounters with mysticism ==
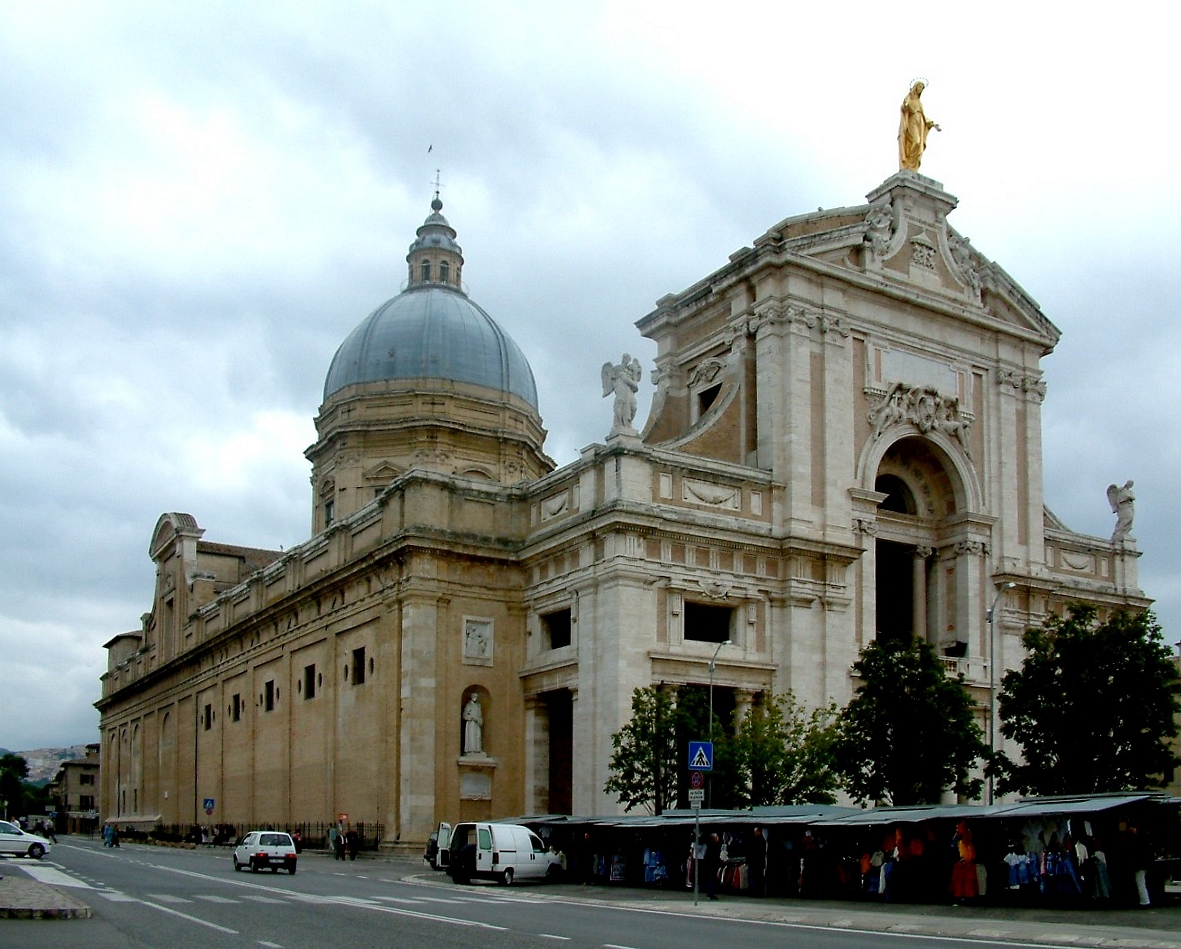
The Basilica of Santa Maria degli Angeli in Assisi where Simone had one of three spiritual "encounters that really counted", leading to her conversion to Christianity

Weil was born into a secular household and raised in "complete agnosticism". As a teenager, she considered the existence of God for herself and decided nothing could be known either way. In her Spiritual Autobiography, however, Weil records that she always had a Christian outlook, taking to heart from her earliest childhood the idea of loving one's neighbour.

Weil was attracted to the Christian faith beginning in 1935, when she had the first of three pivotal religious experiences: being moved by the beauty of villagers singing hymns in a procession she stumbled across while on holiday to Portugal (in Póvoa de Varzim). Weil later wrote "the conviction was suddenly borne in upon her that Christianity is pre-eminently the religion of slaves, that slaves cannot help belonging to it, and she among others."

While in Assisi during the spring of 1937, Weil experienced a religious ecstasy in the Basilica of Santa Maria degli Angeli—the same church in which Saint Francis of Assisi had prayed. She was led to pray for the first time in her life, as Lawrence S. Cunningham describes her visit, stating that during that visit to Assisi in 1937, she had a profound spiritual experience that marked a turning point in her religious life. Cunningham recounts that while exploring the area, Weil visited the grand baroque basilica of Saint Mary of the Angels in the valley below the town. Though architecturally unremarkable to some, the basilica houses a small Romanesque chapel known as the "Little Portion," dating back to the time of Saint Francis. It was in this modest and ancient space, where Saint Francis once gathered his followers, that Weil felt an irresistible impulse to kneel and pray, something she had never done before.

Weil had a third, more powerful, revelation a year later while reciting George Herbert's poem Love III, after which "Christ himself came down and took possession of me", and, from 1938 on, her writings became more mystical and spiritual, while retaining their focus on social and political issues. In 1938 Weil visited the Benedictine Solesmes Abbey and, though suffering from headaches, she found such pure joy in Gregorian chant that she felt the "possibility of living divine love in the midst of affliction".

She was attracted to Catholicism, but declined to be baptized at that time, preferring to remain outside due to "the love of those things that are outside Christianity". While deeply religious, Weil was skeptical of the Church as an institution, and its dogma, writing, "I have not the slightest love for the Church in the strict sense of the word". She was appalled by the concept of Anathema Sit, as she refused to separate herself from unbelievers. Weil felt that humility is incompatible with belonging to a social group "chosen by God", whether that group is a nation or a Church. Weil also condemns the state of contemporary Christianity, arguing that it had become a social convention entangled with the interests of those who exploit others. While Roman civilization replaced love with pride, earlier traditions upheld perfect obedience, which the Greeks honored through their reverence for science. Weil wrote that obedience is the "supreme virtue", and that the universe's blind material forces are not sovereign, but obey limits set by God out of love. For Weil, this idea was present in pre-Roman Christianity and echoed in the wisdom of the Pythagoreans, Lao Tzu, Hinduism, and fragments of Egyptian thought.

Weil describes a spiritual impurity, a lack of the "spirit of truth" in the modern church and in modern science. In response, she calls for a total and unconditional giving of oneself to God. Weil emphasizes the importance of attention as a means of opening the mind to eternal wisdom. She rejects a pragmatic approach to faith, likening it to a pharmaceutical advertisement, only valuable for what it promises to deliver. True faith, she insists, must be total and it must matter so much that losing it would equate to losing the will to live. Early Christianity might have nourished this approach, but its transformation under Roman influence led to the rejection of divine providence, except in highly personal forms. According to Weil, only mystics preserved this deeper understanding, though they were often condemned.

Weil did not limit her curiosity to Christianity. She was interested in other religious traditions—especially the Greek and Egyptian mysteries; Hinduism (especially the Upanishads and the Bhagavad Gita); and Mahayana Buddhism. She believed that all these and other traditions contained elements of genuine revelation, writing:

Greece, Egypt, ancient India, the beauty of the world, the pure and authentic reflection of this beauty in art and science...these things have done as much as the visibly Christian ones to deliver me into Christ's hands as his captive. I think I might even say more.

Nevertheless, Weil was opposed to religious syncretism, claiming that it effaced the particularity of the individual traditions:

Each religion is alone true, that is to say, that at the moment we are thinking of it we must bring as much attention to bear on it as if there were nothing else ... A "synthesis" of religion implies a lower quality of attention.

Weil accepts the truth of Christ's miracles but asserts that the miracles of Tibetan and Hindu traditions are also real. She sees authentic Christian inspiration as preserved in mysticism, and she criticizes a conception of God as a master to be worshipped in the manner of slaves or pagans honoring an emperor, calling this idolatrous. Instead, she defines divine providence as the organizing principle of the cosmos.

== London period ==
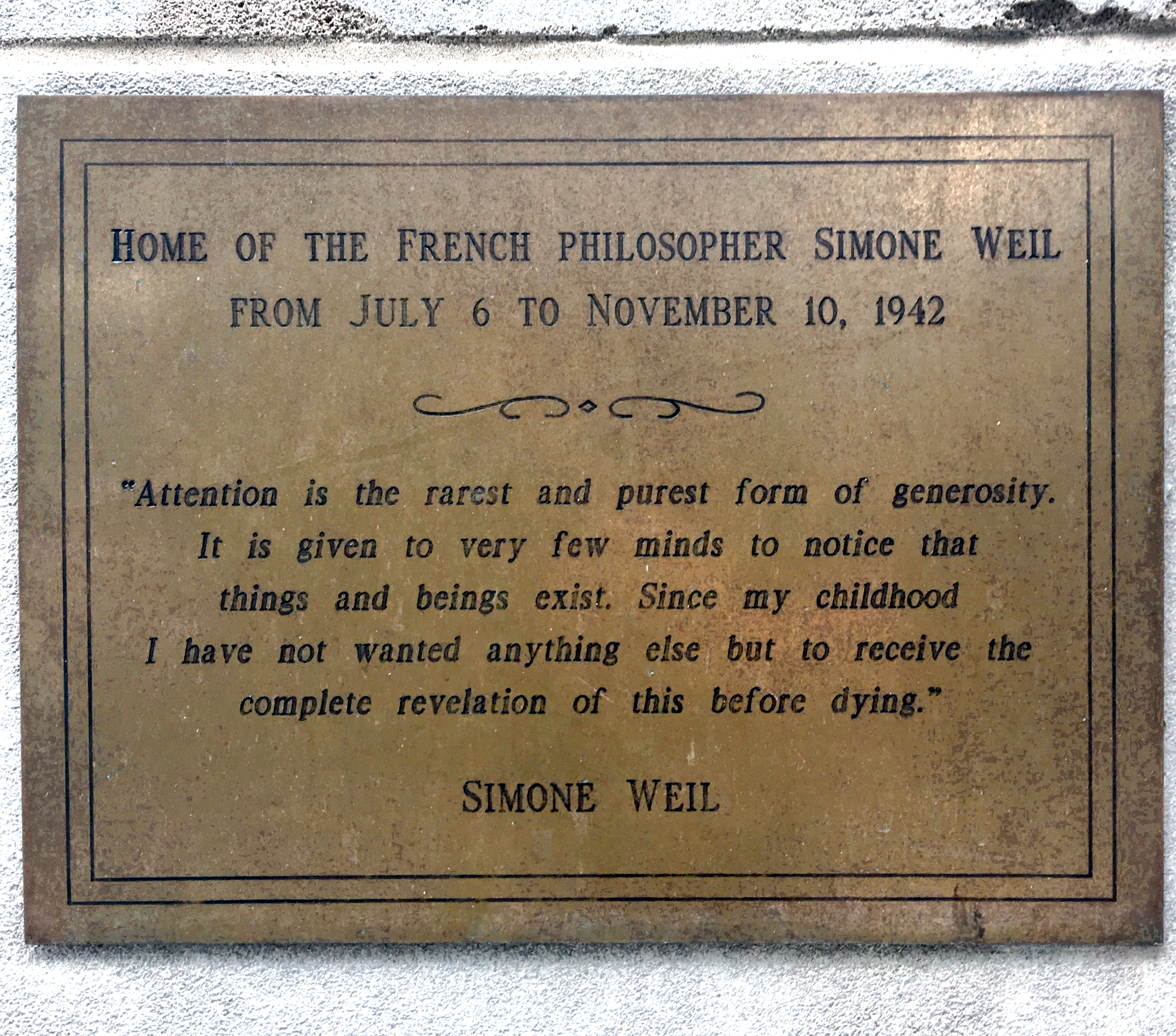
A commemorative plaque on the exterior of the apartment building at 549 Riverside Drive in New York City where Weil lived in 1942

In 1942, Weil travelled to the United States with her family. She had been reluctant to leave France, but agreed to do so as she wanted to see her parents to safety and knew they would not leave without her. She was also encouraged by the fact that it would be relatively easy for her to reach Britain from the United States, where she could join the French Resistance. She had hopes of being sent back to France as a covert agent. Weil was introduced to André Philip, Minister of the Interior under De Gaulle, by Maurice Schumann, a fellow student of Alain. Phillip wrote to Weil, saying he read her work before the war and respected her. Weil attended his lecture while he was in New York, and Phillip called for a moral and spiritual revolution for a Free France, with morals superior to that of Vichy France. Phillip interviewed Weil for a position in the Commissariat for the Interior in London. In 1943 Weil was hired to work there under Phillip and Francis Louis Coston. She was limited to desk work in London analyzing reports from resistance movements, although this did give her time to write one of her largest and best known works: The Need for Roots.

During this time Weil also rapidly wrote many other texts, including Draft for a Statement of Human Obligations and Note on the General Suppression of Political Parties, translations of sections of the Upanishads, What is Sacred in Every Human Being?, Are We Fighting for Justice?, and Essential Ideas for a New Constitution, and Concerning the Colonial Problem in its Relation to the Destiny of the French People. These ideas influenced the Need for Roots, and Weil began to envision a world where the Allies obtained victory and a new France could be built. Weil was worried that France would rebuild with the same mistakes as the French Revolution of 1789, and Weil was concerned about Phillip's vision for a new country based on universal rights which Weil felt was insufficient, advocating instead for a new country built on a framework of obligations and needs. Weil also argues for a patriotism not rooted in borders, but instead rooted in compassion. These arguments reflect the concern Weil and other thinkers at the time have concerning the rebuilding of a free France.

Weil wrote furiously during this period, sending a plethora of proposals, though she was frustrated by the feeling that she was too safe and was not doing enough to address the suffering of France. De Gaulle rejected her plans, and French forces were not willing to send her back to France to join the resistance more directly. There is now evidence that Weil was recruited by the Special Operations Executive, with a view to sending her back to France as a clandestine wireless operator. In May 1943, preparations were underway to send her to Thame Park in Oxfordshire for training, but the plan was cancelled soon after, as her failing health became known.

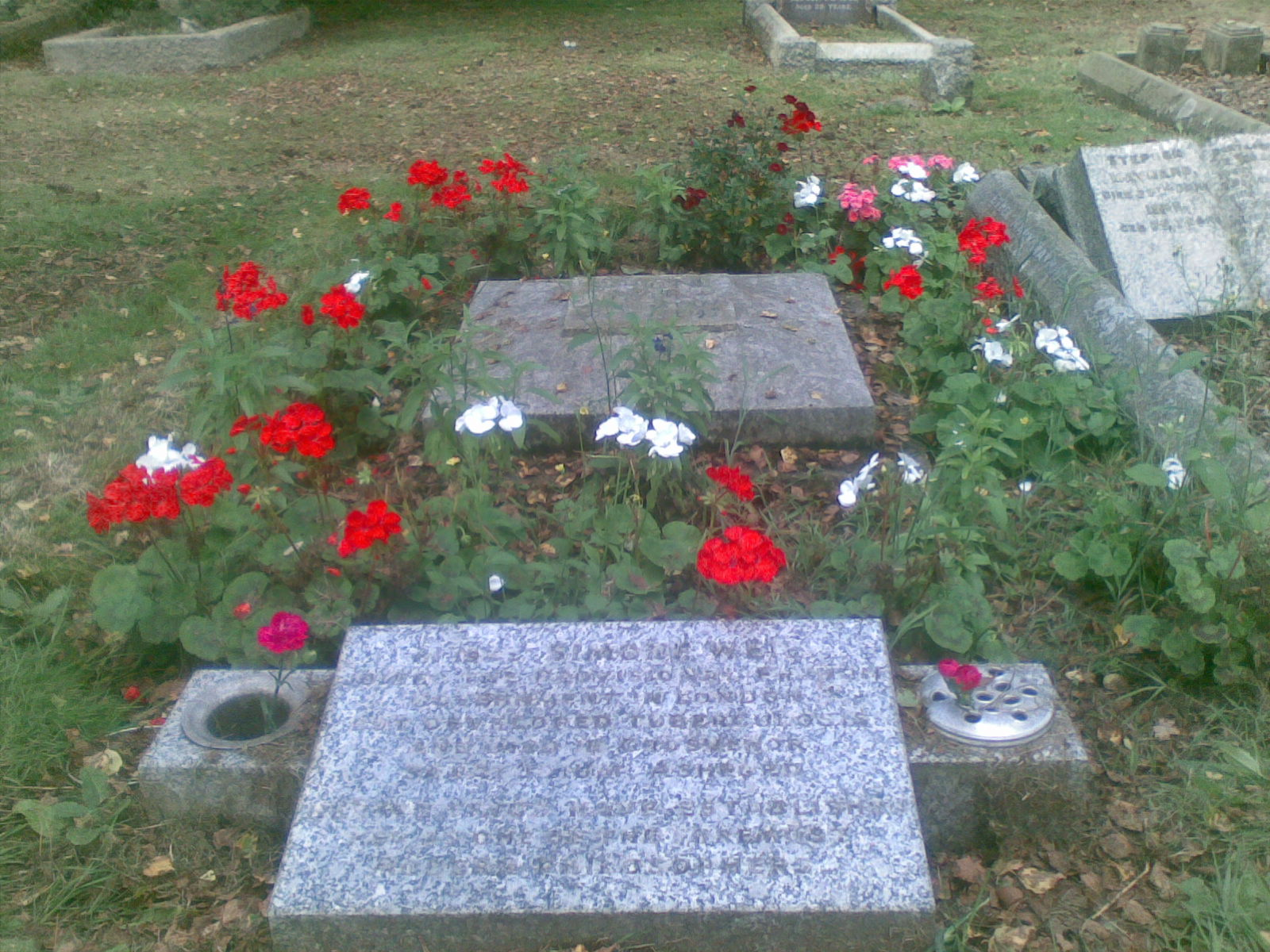
Weil's grave in Bybrook Cemetery, Ashford, Kent, August 2012

The rigorous work routine she assumed soon took a heavy toll. Weil was found slumped on the floor of her apartment, emaciated and exhausted. In 1943, Weil was diagnosed with tuberculosis and instructed to rest and eat well. However, she refused special treatment because of her long-standing political idealism and her detachment from material things. Instead, she limited her intake to what she believed residents of German-occupied France ate. She most likely ate even less, as she refused on most occasions. It is possible that she was baptized during this period. Her condition quickly deteriorated and she was moved to a sanatorium at Grosvenor Hall in Ashford, Kent.

== Death ==
After a lifetime of battling illness and frailty, Weil died in August 1943 from cardiac failure at the age of 34. The coroner's report said that "the deceased did kill and slay herself by refusing to eat whilst the balance of her mind was disturbed".

The exact cause of her death remains a subject of debate. Some claim that her refusal to eat came from her desire to express some form of solidarity toward the victims of the war. Others think that Weil's self-starvation occurred after her study of Arthur Schopenhauer. In his chapters on Christian saintly asceticism and salvation, Schopenhauer had described self-starvation as a preferred method of self-denial. However, Simone Pétrement, one of Weil's first and most significant biographers, regards the coroner's report as simply mistaken. Basing her opinion on letters written by the personnel of the sanatorium at which Simone Weil was treated, Pétrement affirms that Weil asked for food on different occasions while she was hospitalized and even ate a little bit a few days before her death; according to her, it was, in fact, Weil's poor health condition that eventually made her unable to eat.

Weil's first English biographer, Richard Rees, offers several possible explanations for her death, citing her compassion for the suffering of her countrymen in occupied France and her love for and close imitation of Christ. Rees sums up by saying: "As for her death, whatever explanation one may give of it will amount in the end to saying that she died of love."

== Philosophy ==
=== Absence ===
Absence is the key image for her metaphysics, cosmology, cosmogony, and theodicy. She believed that God is created by an act of self-delimitation—in other words, she argued that because God is conceived as utter fullness, a perfect being, no creature can exist except where God is not. Thus, creation occurred only when God withdrew in part. This idea mirrors tzimtzum, a central notion in the Jewish Kabbalah creation narrative.

This is, for Weil, an original kenosis ("emptiness") preceding the corrective kenosis of Christ's incarnation. Thus, according to her, humans are born in a damned position, not because of original sin, but because to be created at all they must be what God is not; in other words, they must be inherently "unholy" in some sense. This idea fits more broadly into apophatic theology.

This notion of creation is a cornerstone of her theodicy, for if creation is conceived this way—as necessarily entailing evil—then there is no problem of the entrance of evil into a perfect world. Nor does the presence of evil constitute a limitation of God's omnipotence under Weil's notion; according to her, evil is present not because God could not create a perfect world, but because the act of "creation" in its very essence implies the impossibility of perfection.

However, this explanation of the essentiality of evil does not imply that humans are simply, originally, and continually doomed; on the contrary, Weil claims that "evil is the form which God's mercy takes in this world". Weil believed that evil, and its consequent affliction, serve the role of driving humans towards God, writing, "The extreme affliction which overtakes human beings does not create human misery, it merely reveals it."

=== Affliction ===
Weil developed the concept of "affliction" (French: malheur) while working in factories with workers reduced to a machine-like existence where they could not consider real thought or rebellion with Weil stating "thought flies from affliction as promptly and irresistibly as an animal flees from death". Weil found this force too inhumane stating "affliction constrains a man to ask continually 'why' - the question to which there is essentially no reply" and nothing in the world can rob us of the power to say 'I' except for extreme affliction".

Simone Weil's concept of affliction is an exploration of human suffering that extends beyond mere physical or emotional pain. She characterizes affliction as a multifaceted experience encompassing physical torment, psychological distress, and social degradation, which collectively uproot an individual's life and identity. Weil distinguishes affliction from general suffering by emphasizing its capacity to isolate individuals from others and from themselves. Affliction imposes a sense of guilt and self-loathing on the innocent, effectively branding the soul with a mark akin to slavery. This branding leads to a loss of personal significance and a feeling of worthlessness, as the afflicted person internalizes scorn and revulsion that logically should be directed at the perpetrator of injustice. Weil sees affliction as a potential site of grace, not because suffering is inherently good, but because it can strip away illusions and allow openness to the divine.

According to Weil, souls may experience different levels of affliction with affliction worse for the same souls that are also most able to experience spiritual joy. Weil's notion of affliction is a sort of "suffering plus" which transcends both body and mind, a physical and mental anguish that scourges the very soul.

The better we are able to conceive of the fullness of joy, the purer and more intense will be our suffering in affliction and our compassion for others. ...

Suffering and enjoyment as sources of knowledge. The serpent offered knowledge to Adam and Eve. The sirens offered knowledge to Ulysses. These stories teach that the soul is lost through seeking knowledge in pleasure. Why? Pleasure is perhaps innocent on condition that we do not seek knowledge in it. It is permissible to seek that only in suffering.

— Simone Weil, Gravity and Grace (chpt 16 'Affliction')

=== Beauty ===
Simone Weil's concept of beauty is not an isolated aesthetic category, but a deeply moral and spiritual principle that interweaves with nearly every facet of her thought, including affliction, attention, justice, God, and the pursuit of truth. In Gravity and Grace, she writes: "The love of the beauty of the world is the only pure love. It is the love that enables us to look at things without trying to appropriate them." She reiterates this in a related line: "The beautiful is that which we desire without wishing to eat it. We desire that it be." Here, Weil expresses that beauty fosters a kind of ethical desire, one that does not consume but simply affirms the existence of what is beautiful. This idea links beauty directly to justice, which she defines not as fairness or social order, but as the full recognition of another's reality without attempting to possess or alter it. In her words "Justice consists in seeing that no harm comes to those whom we have noticed as real beings." Weil laments that modern civilization (its politics, media, education, and literature) has severed this connection between beauty and truth. It fosters a corrupt understanding of greatness, rooted in power and spectacle rather than humility, attention, and beauty. She contrasts this with true greatness as seen in Zen poems, Giotto's paintings, and the lives of saints As such, Weil propose beauty as something that can help someone transcend the perspective of an individual's own project.

Theologically for Weil, "The beautiful is the experiential proof that the incarnation is possible". The beauty that is inherent in the form of the world (this inherency is proven, for her, in geometry, and expressed in all good art) is the proof that the world points to something beyond itself; it establishes the essentially telic character of all that exists. In Weil's concept, beauty extends throughout the universe:

"[W]e must have faith that the universe is beautiful on all levels...and that it has a fullness of beauty in relation to the bodily and psychic structure of each of the thinking beings that actually do exist and of all those that are possible. It is this very agreement of an infinity of perfect beauties that gives a transcendent character to the beauty of the world...He (Christ) is really present in the universal beauty. The love of this beauty proceeds from God dwelling in our souls and goes out to God present in the universe".

She also wrote that "The beauty of this world is Christ's tender smile coming to us through matter".

Beauty also served a soteriological function for Weil: "Beauty captivates the flesh in order to obtain permission to pass right to the soul." It constitutes, then, another way in which the divine reality behind the world invades people's lives: where affliction conquers with brute force, beauty sneaks in and topples the empire of the self from within. Overall, Simone Weil views beauty as a manifestation of divine reality that draws the soul toward truth and goodness. For her, beauty has an impersonal quality that compels attention, a key virtue in her philosophy. Beauty can momentarily lift a person out of self-centeredness, preparing them to encounter God. It is not merely aesthetic, but moral and spiritual in nature.

=== Decreation ===
In Waiting for God Weil outlines the concept of decreation (French: décréation). Weil believed that if humans are to imitate God they must renounce their power and their autonomy. Weil refers to this as decreation which she referred to as "passive activity" or based on her childhood readings of the Bhagavad Gita, "non-active action".

Weil's concept of necessity related to decreation. Weil felt that necessity includes physical forces as well as social forces. Weil states: "The self and the social are two great idols, but one is saved by grace." All the natural movements of the soul are controlled by laws similar to gravity, except grace. While gravity is the work of creation, the work of grace consists of decreation.

Weil felt that when an individual is self-centred they deny necessity. Consent to necessity means the only choice is whether or not they desire the good. For Weil, this type of consent is obtained metaphysically through decreation rather than through effort.

Decreation allows for obedience to the truth without feeling cheated or interested in compensation. Weil states:

"And forgive us our debts, as we also forgive our debtors.' To remit debts is to renounce our own personality. It means renouncing everything that goes to make up our ego, without any exception. It means knowing that in the ego there is nothing whatever, no psychological element, that external circumstances could not do away with. It means accepting that truth. It means being happy that things should be so."

Simone Weil argues that our perception of reality is clouded by attachment—attachments born from the self, projected onto the world. We do not see things as they are, but as they relate to our desires, values, and imagined needs. The self, or "I," fabricates a world driven by illusions: imagined debts others owe us, rewards we fantasize receiving from kings or gods. These imaginary constructs become the primary motivators of human behavior because, unlike real rewards, they are limitless.

True access to reality requires detachment: the stripping away of these illusions and the destruction of the "I." This detachment is not mere indifference but a spiritual discipline that suspends imagination and opens one to necessity and truth. Only in this emptiness—desire without an object—can we encounter the presence of God, which is veiled by imagination but present in everything that exists.

Weil sees obedience as taking two forms. One is mechanical, driven by imagined righteousness or divine approval—an obedience rooted in desire and self-deception. The other is a form of pure attention: a fixed gaze on the real relationships among things, free from self-interest. This pure attention is the only true motive for action, because it does not seek reward or justification.

To harm another is to attempt to fill our own emptiness by taking from them—by expanding ourselves at their expense. But Weil insists that the only true freedom lies in the voluntary destruction of the self, a self that affliction may also destroy involuntarily. This loss, when embraced through decreation, allows the soul to participate in the divine act of creation.

Even in ancient mysteries, people served or touched the divine without knowing it, clothing God in ignorance. For Weil, the meaning of such mystery is not in knowing, but in the purity of action and attention, being with God without imagining or naming Him.

=== Language ===
Simone Weil regarded language as a powerful but often deceptive force. In her essay The Power of Words, she argued that abstract political terms such as "justice," "nation," or "revolution" often function as empty expressions. These words, she claimed, are used to provoke emotion while concealing contradictions and preventing genuine thought. Their vagueness allows them to be applied in support of virtually any position, regardless of consistency or truth.

Weil emphasized the moral responsibility of language. She connected its proper use to her concept of attention, which she described as the disciplined focus on the reality of others and the world. In The Need for Roots, she criticized the reliance on rhetorical ideals such as "rights" and "freedom" when those concepts are separated from concrete obligations and the basic needs of individuals and communities. She argued that such language often obscures the real conditions of justice rather than clarifying them.

Weil also explored the limits of language, especially in relation to experiences of suffering, grace, and the divine. She held that some aspects of human reality cannot be fully expressed in words. Language, while necessary for communication, can never fully encompass the depth of moral or spiritual truth.

=== Obligation ===
Weil advocated for rebuilding a Free France around a framework of obligations and needs and cautioning against a system built of rights. Weil's The Need for Roots was originally titled Draft for a Statement of Human Obligations. Weil felt that in our moral culture centered on individual rights, it's as though we constantly turn away from others' suffering because we lack the moral strength to confront its most extreme expressions.

Weil felt that "all human beings are bound by identical obligations, although they are performed in different ways according to particular circumstances" and that "duty to the human being as such - that alone is eternal." Weil differentiates between rights and obligations, viewing the two as subject and object. "The actual relationship between the two is as between object and subject. A man, considered in isolation, only has duties, amongst which are certain duties towards himself. Other men, seen from his point of view, only have rights. He, in his turn, has rights, when seen from the point of view of other men, who recognize that they have obligations towards him. A man left alone in the universe would have no rights whatever, but he would have obligations." Weil elaborates, supporting the idea that obligations alone are independent, stating, "rights are always found to be related to certain conditions. Obligations alone remain independent of conditions," with obligations being a universal condition: "All human beings are bound by identical obligations, although these are performed in different ways according to particular circumstances," whereas rights are conditional: "...a right is not effectual by itself, but only in relation to the obligation to which it corresponds".

=== Rootedness ===
In The Need for Roots Weil argues that rootedness is a spiritual need which involves their real, active, and natural participation in the life of a collectivity that keeps alive the treasures of the past and the aspirations of the future. Weil believes this rootedness is natural, coming from place, birth, and occupation with each person needing to have multiple roots and deriving their moral, intellectual, and spiritual life from the environment in which they belong. Weil makes the case for roots or the idea that the persistence of people is tied to the persistence of their culture, their way of life, as carried through generations. For Weil roots involved obligations to participate in community life, feel connected to place, and maintain links through time. The "roots" Weil refers to are nourishment that enable humans to fully grow and that a rooted community allows the individual to develop with a view toward God or eternal values.

In contrast, a threat to the human soul is uprootedness (déracinement) is the condition of people where the only binding forces in society are money and the imagined nation. For industrial working conditions Weil states "although they have remained geographically stationary, they have been morally uprooted, banished and then reinstated as it were on sufferance, in the form of industrial brawn". Weil states that "money destroys human roots wherever it is able to penetrate" and it "manages to outweigh all other motives because the effort it demands of the mind is so much less...". Uprootedness may be caused by many factors, including conquest, colonialism, money, and economic domination. Weil states money destroys roots wherever it goes, because the drive to make money supplants everything else. Uprootedness is aggravated if people also lack participation in community life and uprooted people lack connections with the past and a sense of their own integral place in the world.

Weil opposed behavior that uprooted people including colonialism (including the French empire), some forms of mass media, and poor industrial working conditions. Weil did not excuse moral issues within a place, stating countries are a vital medium but one with good and evil and justice and injustice. Weil wrote passionately against the French government's colonial policies including the mission civilisatrice stating "we can no longer say or think that we have received from on high the mission to teach the universe how to live". though Weil also opposed the creation of new nations based on the European model stating "there are already too many nations in the world"

=== Justice ===
Weil rejected conventional models of justice based on reciprocity, retribution, or contractual fairness, arguing instead that such frameworks often obscure the reality of human suffering and reduce persons to abstractions. In her view, justice must begin with the capacity for attention, what she described as a moral act of seeing others in their full humanity, especially in their vulnerability. Weil criticized systems of punishment that seek to balance harm or exact vengeance, contending that true justice does not consist in giving each their due in a symmetrical sense, but in preventing further harm and affirming the dignity of all persons, including wrongdoers. She believed punishment should not be administered in ways that humiliate or spiritually degrade, but rather in ways that might allow for moral awareness without annihilating the soul. Drawing from Christian traditions, Weil saw justice as a form of alignment with a higher, transcendent order and an imitation of divine love that demands the renunciation of force and the refusal to treat others as means or enemies. This outlook led her to sharply critique legal and bureaucratic systems that depersonalize both victims and offenders, warning that the mechanical application of justice often perpetuates injustice by ignoring the individual and existential dimensions of affliction.

=== Patriotism of compassion ===
Weil's The Need for Roots discusses the "uprootedness of the nation" and false conceptions of greatness attached to religion and patriotism. Weil was not opposed to patriotism but saw it rooted not in pride but instead in compassion and that this compassion, unlike pride, can be extended to other nations stating compassion is "able, without hindrance, to cross frontiers extend itself over all countries in misfortune, overall countries without exception for all peoples are subjected to the wretchedness of the human condition". She compares the often antagonized and prideful feelings resulting from a patriotism based on grandeur with the warmth of a patriotism based on tender feeling of pity and an awareness of how a country is ultimately fragile and perishable. A patriotism based on compassion allows one to still see the flaws in one's country, while still remaining ever ready to make the ultimate sacrifice if obligated.

=== Spiritual nature of work ===
Weil's The Need for Roots argues for the spiritual nature of work placing labor not merely as an economic necessity but as a moral and metaphysical act relating to attention, affliction, and rootedness. Weil believes urban and rural workers face conditions that create uprootedness. Weil argues for a social model that would be neither capitalist nor socialist, but restore human dignity through a cooperative system where the workplace becomes a site of meaningful engagement, community, and spiritual fulfillment and workers feel at home.

Weil criticizes the disunity and ineffectiveness of well-intentioned reformers, noting that activism is often undermined by a lack of cohesion and by human nature's tendency to overlook the suffering of the truly oppressed. She observes that unions frequently focus on the relatively privileged, neglecting marginalized groups such as youth, women, and immigrant workers, who bear the brunt of systemic injustice. She also critiques socialist reformers who attempt to make everyone proletariat rather than improve conditions.

For urban laborers in particular, Weil advocates for the abolition of large-scale factories in favor of smaller, decentralized workshops. These would operate with limited working hours and dedicate time to learning and community life. She envisions a structure in which machinery is owned by individuals or cooperatives, with homes and land granted by the state to encourage stability and autonomy

Crucially, Weil maintains that the alienation of urban workers can only be healed by forms of industrial production and culture that make them feel "at home". In her proposed cooperative system, workers would receive a set number of tasks and be free to organize their own schedules, fostering both responsibility and agency. Machines would be owned by individuals or cooperatives, not the factories, and combined with house and land conferred to them by the state. She insists that working and thinking must not be separated; instead, physical labor should engage the intellect and spirit alongside the body Weil states that working and thinking should not be separate acts.

In the last few pages of this section of The Need for Roots she focuses on her central theme – that the great vocation of our times is to create a civilization which recognizes the spiritual nature of work. She draws further parallels between spiritual mechanism and physical mechanism, referring to parables in the Bible concerning seeds and then discussing our scientific understanding about how plants reach the surface by consuming the energy in their seeds and then grow upwards towards the light. Weil suggests similar parallels could be targeted for urban workers. She says if people can have both spiritual and scientific ideas converging in the act of work, then even the fatigue associated with toil can be transformed for good, becoming "the pain that makes the beauty of the world penetrates right into the core of the human body".

Weil further asserts that the return of truth will also reawaken the dignity of physical labor. She describes physical work as a kind of breath, an act in which the human body and soul become intermediaries between different states of matter. Yet she warns that labor can become violent to human nature, especially when marked by monotony. To consent to work, she concludes, is second only to consenting to death, both acts of submission that are essential to life and spiritual growth.

=== Metaxu ===
Metaxu, a concept Weil borrowed from Plato, is that which both separates and connects (e.g., as the word 'cleave' means both to cut and join). This idea of connecting distance was of the first importance for Weil's understanding of the created realm. The world as a whole, along with any of its components, including the physical body, is to be regarded as serving the same function for people in relation to God that a blind man's stick serves for him in relation to the world about him. They do not afford direct insight, but can be used experimentally to bring the mind into practical contact with reality. This metaphor allows any absence to be interpreted as a presence, and is a further component in Weil's theodicy.

In Gravity and Grace Weil provides a metaphor to explain this concept "Two prisoners whose cells adjoin communicate with each other by knocking on the wall. The wall is the thing which separates them but it is also their means of communication. It is the same with us and God. Every separation is a link."

=== Attention ===
As Weil explains in her book Waiting for God, attention consists of suspending or emptying one's thought, such that one is ready to receive—to be penetrated by—the object to which one turns one's gaze, be that object one's neighbour, or ultimately, God. Weil states that "the capacity to give one's attention to a sufferer is a very rare and difficult thing: it is almost a miracle; it is a miracle". Attention may be linked to compassion so that, with attention, one can identify with an afflicted individual letting go of ourselves and allowing the other person to have our attention. Weil contrasts this attention with pity describing pity as "it consists in helping someone in misfortune so as not to be obligated to think about him anymore, or for the pleasure of feeling distance between himself and oneself".

As Weil explains, one can love God by praying to God, and attention is the very "substance of prayer": when one prays, one empties oneself, fixes one's whole gaze towards God, and becomes ready to receive God. Similarly, for Weil, people can love their neighbours by emptying themselves, becoming ready to receive one's neighbour in all their naked truth, asking one's neighbour: "What are you going through?" Weil connects attention directly to the moral and spiritual life. It is the foundation of love and justice, and also the essence of the way we apprehend beauty stating "Attention is the rarest and purest form of generosity."

This attention is not a passive gaze, but an active, ethical engagement, a suspension of self (decreation) so that the reality of the other may come forward in its own truth (reflecting her view of beauty). In her essay Reflections on the Right Use of School Studies with a View to the Love of God, Weil offers one of her clearest formulations of this idea:

"The love of our neighbor in all its fullness simply means being able to say to him: 'What are you going through?' It is a recognition that the sufferer exists, not only as a unit in a collection, or a specimen from the social category labeled 'unfortunate,' but as a man, exactly like us, who was one day stamped with a special mark by affliction. For this reason it is enough, but it is indispensable, to know how to look at him in a certain way. This way of looking is first of all attentive. The soul empties itself of all its own contents in order to receive into itself the being it is looking at, just as he is, in all his truth."

Weil further equates aspects of attention to love stating "To empty ourselves (French: Se vider) of our false divinity, to deny ourselves, to give up being the center of the world in imagination, to discern that all points in the world are equally centers and that the true center is outside the world, this is to consent to the rule of mechanical necessity in matter and of free choice at the center of each soul. Such consent is love. The face of this love, which is turned toward thinking persons, is the love of our neighbor." Weil also equates attention to justice. In Gravity and Grace, she writes: "Justice consists in seeing that no harm comes to those whom we have noticed as real beings." Weil also states To harm another person is to receive something from him, gaining importance and expanding, filling an emptiness in ourselves by creating one in someone else.

=== Three Forms of the Implicit Love of God ===
In Waiting for God, Weil explains that the three forms of implicit love of God are (1) love of neighbour (2) love of the beauty of the world and (3) love of religious ceremonies. As Weil writes, by loving these three objects (neighbour, world's beauty and religious ceremonies), one indirectly loves God before "God comes in person to take the hand of his future bride," since prior to God's arrival, one's soul cannot yet directly love God as the object. Love of neighbour occurs (i) when the strong treat the weak as equals, (ii) when people give personal attention to those that otherwise seem invisible, anonymous, or non-existent, and (iii) when people look at and listen to the afflicted as they are, without explicitly thinking about God—i.e., Weil writes, when "God in us" loves the afflicted, rather than people loving them in God. Second, Weil explains, love of the world's beauty occurs when humans imitate God's love for the cosmos: just as God creatively renounced his command over the world—letting it be ruled by human autonomy and matter's "blind necessity"—humans give up their imaginary command over the world, seeing the world no longer as if they were the world's center. Finally, Weil explains, love of religious ceremonies occurs as an implicit love of God, when religious practices are pure. Weil writes that purity in religion is seen when "faith and love do not fail", and most absolutely, in the Eucharist.

== Works ==
Weil's most famous works were published posthumously. According to Lissa McCullough, Weil would likely have been "intensely displeased" by the attention paid to her life rather than her works. She believed it was her writings that embodied the best of her, not her actions and definitely not her personality. Weil had similar views about others, saying that if one looks at the lives of great figures in separation from their works, it "necessarily ends up revealing their pettiness above all", as it's in their works that they have put the best of themselves.

=== The Iliad, or The Poem of Force ===
Weil wrote The Iliad, or The Poem of Force (French: L'Iliade ou le poème de la force), a 24-page essay, in 1939 in Marseilles. First published in 1940 in Les Cahiers du Sud, the only significant literary magazine available in the French free zone. It is still commonly used in university courses on the Classics.

The essay focuses on the theme that Weil calls 'Force' in the Iliad, which she defines as "that x which turns anyone subjected to it into a thing." In the opening sentences of the essay, she sets out her view of the role of Force in the poem:

The true hero, the true subject, the centre of the Iliad, is force. Force employed by man, force that enslaves man, force before which man's flesh shrinks away. In this work, at all times, the human spirit is shown as modified by its relations with force, as swept away, blinded, by the very force it imagined it could handle, as deformed by the weight of the force it submits to.

The New York Review of Books has described the essay as one of Weil's most celebrated works, while it has also been described as among "the twentieth century's most beloved, tortured, and profound responses to the world's greatest and most disturbing poem."

Simone Pétrement, a friend of Weil's, wrote that the essay portrayed the Iliad as an accurate and compassionate depiction of how both victors and victims are harmed by the use of force.

The essay contains several extracts from the epic which Weil translated herself from the original Greek; Pétrement records how Weil took over half an hour per line.

=== The Need for Roots ===
Weil's book The Need for Roots (French: L'Enracinement) was written in early 1943, immediately before her death later that year. In it Weil presents a morality based on compassion rather than the rule of law. At this time Weil was in London working for the French Resistance and trying to convince its leader, Charles de Gaulle, to form a contingent of nurses, including Weil, who would parachute to the front lines. Weil's intention was partially for these nurses to provide care, but also to offer an inspiring moral opposite to Nazism with Weil stating "it may be that our victory depends upon the presence among us of a corresponding inspiration, but authentic and pure".

The Need for Roots has an ambitious plan. It sets out to address the past and to propose a road map for the future of France after World War II. She painstakingly analyzes the spiritual and ethical milieu that led to France's defeat by the German army, and then addresses these issues with the prospect of eventual French victory.

=== Gravity and Grace ===
While Gravity and Grace (French: La Pesanteur et la Grâce) is one of the books most associated with Simone Weil, the work was not intended to be a book at all. Rather, the work consists of various passages selected from Weil's notebooks and arranged topically by her friend Gustave Thibon. Weil had given Thibon some of her notebooks written before May 1942, but not with any intent to publish them. Hence, the resulting selections, organization and editing of Gravity and Grace were much influenced by Thibon, a devout Catholic (see Thibon's introduction to Gravity and Grace (Routledge & Kegan Paul, 1952) for more details).

Weil felt gravity and grace were opposites believing that gravity signifies the force of the natural world of which all beings are physically, materially, and socially affected and that this "pulls" attention away from God and the afflicted whereas grace is a form of justice and a counter-balance, motivated by the goodness of God. Weil felt that this gravity (force) and grace (justice) are the two most fundamental aspects of the world and came together at the crucifixion.

=== Waiting for God ===
Waiting for God (French: Attente de Dieu) is a collection of Weil's personal letters and essays compiled and published after her death. The book was published in French in 1950, posthumously, edited by Father Joseph-Marie Perrin and Gustave Thibon and the English translation was published shortly after, in 1951.

Waiting for God opens with Simone Weil's 1942 letters to Dominican priest Jean-Marie Perrin, revealing her deep spiritual turmoil as she grapples with the demands of Christian faith. She reflects on the "just balance" of the world, seeing God's guidance in both human reason and our need for physical and emotional fulfillment. Weil introduces the idea of a "sacred longing", the human pursuit of beauty and connection as an expression of yearning for a tangible divine presence.

Her writings detail a mystical experience that reshaped her understanding of divine love, emphasizing that true devotion requires patient, attentive openness to God. Weil sees suffering (not just joy) as essential to spiritual growth, a path to deeper connection with the divine. Despite her intense faith, she resisted baptism, believing that spiritual readiness must come through divine initiative, not personal decision. The essays explore themes of love, attention, suffering, and religious practice, asserting that love of God must include love for others and the world. Profound and challenging, Waiting for God is a key text for those drawn to mysticism, philosophy, and the complexities of faith.

Essays included in this collection include:

- Reflections on the Right Use of School Studies with a View to the Love of God
- The Love of God and Affliction
- Forms of the Implicit Love of God
- Concerning the 'Our Father'
- The Three Sons of Noah and the History of Mediterranean Civilization

=== Other significant essays ===
Weil wrote many essays, many of which have been compiled into various books. Major essays not included in Gravity and Grace or Waiting for God include:

- Factory Work (1935), based on Weil's experience working in factories, offering insights into the dehumanizing aspects of industrial labor.
- Reflections on the Causes of Liberty and Social Oppression (1934), a critical analysis of oppression in both capitalist and socialist systems, emphasizing the spiritual value of labor.
- The Power of Words (1937) examines how political language and slogans can distort truth and manipulate thought.
- Meditation on Obedience and Liberty (1940) explores the relationship between obedience, authority, and personal freedom.
- What the Occitan Inspiration Consists Of (1941) discusses the spiritual and poetic legacy of the Occitan tradition.
- Human Personality (1943) discusses what constitutes the sacred core in human beings.
- Draft for a Statement of Human Obligations (1943) proposes a framework of obligations as the foundation for justice, contrasting with rights-based approaches.
- Note on the General Suppression of Political Parties (1943) (also known as Essential Ideas for a New Constitution), a radical critique of political parties, arguing they hinder the pursuit of truth and justice. Published posthumously in La Table Ronde in 1950.
- What is Sacred in Every Human Being? (1943), composed shortly before her death. It explores the intrinsic value and dignity of every person.
- Are We Fighting for Justice? (1943) critiques the moral motivations behind the Allied war effort in World War II, asking whether it is truly being fought for justice or simply for victory.
- Concerning the Colonial Problem in its Relation to the Destiny of the French People (1943) (originally Note sur la question coloniale); Weil addresses colonialism and its moral and political implications, particularly for France. She advocates for justice and genuine fraternity between peoples.

== Legacy ==
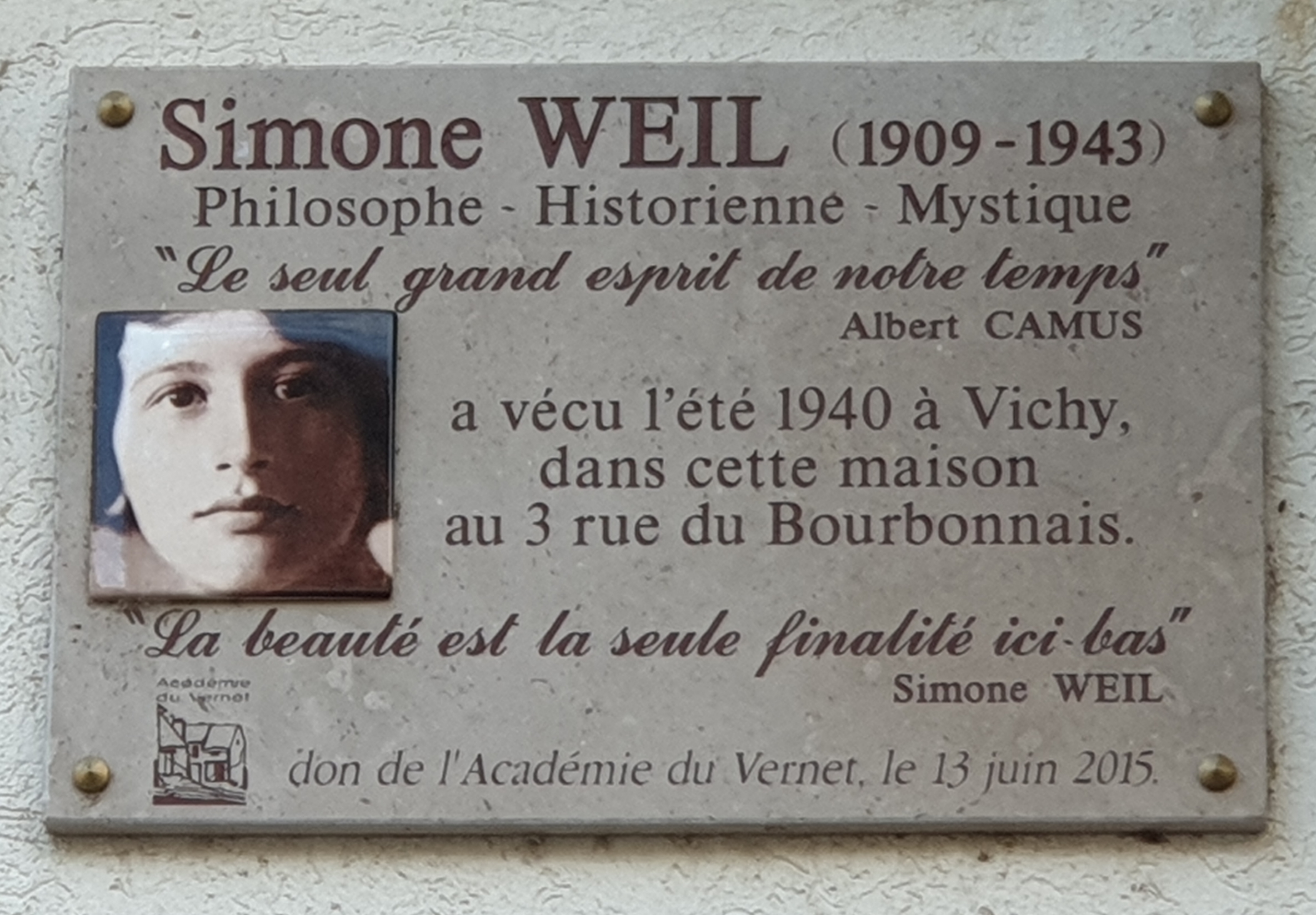
A plaque recognizing Weil

During her lifetime, Weil was known only in relatively narrow circles and even in France, her essays were mostly read only by those interested in radical politics. During the first decade after her death, Weil rapidly became famous, attracting attention throughout the West. For the third quarter of the 20th century, she was widely regarded as the most influential person in the world on new work concerning religious and spiritual matters. Her philosophical, social and political thought also became popular, although not to the same degree as her religious work.

Aside from influencing various fields of study, Weil deeply affected the personal lives of numerous individuals. Pope Paul VI said that Weil was one of his three greatest influences. Weil is also cited as an influence by Iris Murdoch, Jacques Derrida, Albert Camus, Franz Fanon, Emmanuel Levinas, George Grant, Adrienne Rich, Jacqueline Rose, and Thomas Merton. Weil's popularity began to decline in the late 1960s and 1970s. However, more of her work was gradually published, leading to many thousands of new secondary works by Weil scholars, some of whom focused on achieving a deeper understanding of her religious, philosophical and political work. Others broadened the scope of Weil scholarship to investigate her applicability to fields like classical studies, cultural studies, education, and even technical fields like ergonomics.

Many commentators have given highly positive assessments of Weil as a person; some describe her as a saint, even as the greatest saint of the twentieth century, including T. S. Eliot, Dwight Macdonald, Leslie Fiedler, and Robert Coles. After they met at age 18, Simone de Beauvoir wroteː "I envied her for having a heart that could beat right across the world." Weil biographer Gabriella Fiori writes that Weil was "a moral genius in the orbit of ethics, a genius of immense revolutionary range". Maurice Schumann said that since her death there was "hardly a day when the thought of her life did not positively influence his own and serve as a moral guide".

In 1951, Albert Camus wrote that she was "the only great spirit of our times". Foolish though she may have appeared at times—dropping a suitcase full of French resistance papers all over the sidewalk and scrambling to gather them up—her deep engagement with both the theory and practice of caritas, in all its myriad forms, functions as the unifying force of her life and thought. Gustave Thibon, the French philosopher and Weil's close friend, recounts their last meeting, not long before her death: "I will only say that I had the impression of being in the presence of an absolutely transparent soul which was ready to be reabsorbed into original light." The Routledge edition of Gravity and Grace includes a New York Times Book Review stating "'In France she is ranked with Pascal by some, condemned as a dangerous heretic by others, and recognized as a genius by all." In 2017 President Emmanuel Macron mentioned Weil and her philosophy in a joint address to Parliament stating the need for what Weil calls l'effectivité (effectivity).

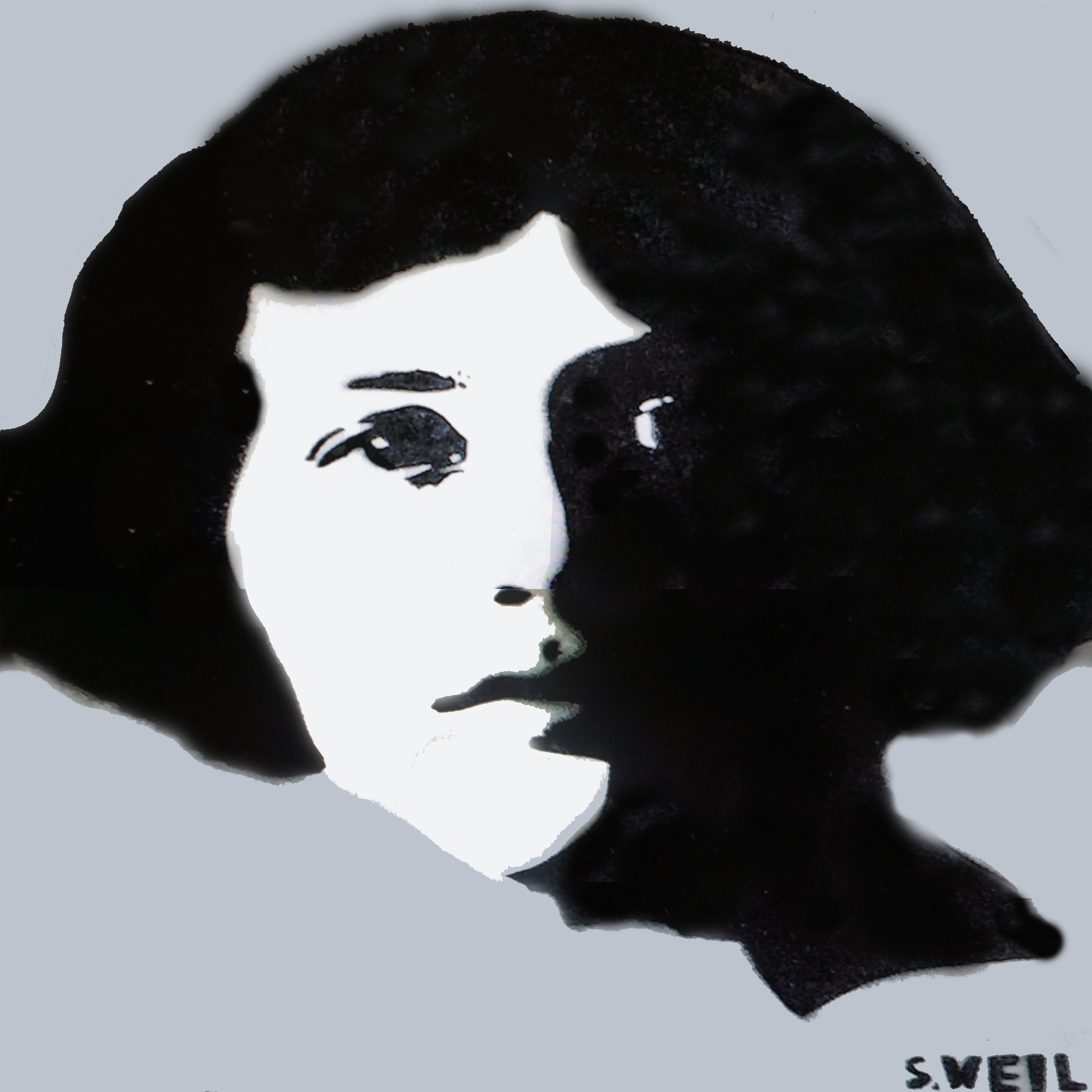
A 2019 street art image of Simone Weil in Berlin-Kreuzberg

Weil has been criticised, however, even by those who otherwise admired her deeply, such as T. S. Eliot, for being excessively prone to divide the world into good and evil, and for her sometimes intemperate judgments. Weil was a harsh critic of the influence of Judaism on Western civilisation. However, her niece Sylvie Weil and biographer Thomas R. Nevin argue that Weil did not reject Judaism and was heavily influenced by its precepts. Weil was an even harsher critic of the Roman Empire, in which she refused to see any value.

According to Eliot, she held up the Cathars as exemplars of goodness, despite there being in his view little concrete evidence on which to base such an assessment. According to Pétrement she idolised Lawrence of Arabia, considering him to be a saint. A few critics have taken an overall negative view. Several Jewish writers, including Susan Sontag, have accused her of antisemitism, although this perspective is far from universal.

A small minority of commentators have judged her to be psychologically unbalanced or sexually obsessed. General Charles de Gaulle, her ultimate boss while she worked for the French Resistance, considered her "insane", although even he was influenced by her and repeated some of her sayings for years after her death.

A meta study from the University of Calgary maintains a bibliography of more than 5,000 books, essays, journal articles, and theses about Weil and her work. Together French and English comprise slightly over 50% of the total records collected. Other organizations dedicated to her work include Association pour l'Étude de la Pensée de Simone Weil and the American Weil Society.

In the decades since her death, her writings have been assembled, annotated, criticized, discussed, disputed, and praised. Along with some twenty volumes of her works, publishers have issued more than thirty biographies, including Simone Weil: A Modern Pilgrimage by Robert Coles, Harvard's Pulitzer-winning professor, who calls Weil 'a giant of reflection.' The latest work of 2025 Princess of Asturias Award Laureate Philosopher Byung-Chul Han About God (2025) delves into the thought of Simone Weil to reflect on the relevance of divinity in the current digital culture.

== Weil in film, stage, and media ==
In Georges Bataille's novella Blue of Noon (completed in 1937), the character Lazare is considered to be based on Weil.

"Approaching Simone" is a play created by Megan Terry. Dramatizing the life, philosophy and death of Simone Weil, Terry's play won the 1969/1970 Obie Award for Best Off-Broadway Play.

Weil was the subject of a 2010 documentary by Julia Haslett, An encounter with Simone Weil. Haslett noted that Weil had become "a little-known figure, practically forgotten in her native France, and rarely taught in universities or secondary schools".

Weil was also the subject of Finnish composer Kaija Saariaho's La Passion de Simone (2008), written with librettist Amin Maalouf.

Chris Kraus' 1996 film Gravity and Grace alludes to the posthumous work of Simone Weil. Chris Kraus' 2000 novel Aliens & Anorexia chronicles her experience producing the film while also touching on Kraus' personal study and interaction with Simone Weil's philosophy and life.

Weil's work, Venice Saved, was not completed in her lifetime but put together as a play and translated by Silvia Panizza and Philip Wilson.

T. S. Eliot, W. H. Auden, Czeslaw Milosz, Seamus Heaney, Flannery O'Connor, Susan Sontag, Octavia Bright, Anne Carson, Adrienne Rich, Annie Dillard, Mary Gordon, Maggie Helwig, Stephanie Strickland, Kate Daniels, Sarah Klassen and Lorri Neilsen Glennall cite Weil as an inspiration of their books and literature. Ocean Vuong references Weil in the novel On Earth We’re Briefly Gorgeous.

Weil has been identified as a significant philosophical influence on Rosalía's album Lux, especially through Weil's conception of love as “loving the distance between ourselves and the loved object. This notion derives from a well-known passage in Gravity and Grace “To love purely is to consent to distance; it is to adore the distance between ourselves and that which we love” which is central to Weil's broader reflections on love, beauty, and decreation. The physical version include a quote by Weil "Love is not consolation. It is light."

== Bibliography ==
=== Works in French ===
- Simone Weil, Œuvres complètes (Gallimard, 1989–2006, 6 vols.)
- Réflexions sur la guerre (La Critique sociale, no. 10, November 1933)
- Chronicles from the Spanish Civil War, in: 'Le Libertaire', a French anarchist magazine, 1936
- La Pesanteur et la grâce (Paris : Plon, 1947)
- L'enracinement : Prélude à une déclaration des devoirs envers l'être humain (Gallimard [Espoir], 1949)
- Attente de Dieu (1950)
- La connaissance surnaturelle (Gallimard [Espoir], 1950)
- La Condition ouvrière (Gallimard [Espoir], 1951)
- Lettre à un religieux (Gallimard [Espoir], 1951)
- Les Intuitions pré-chrétiennes (Paris: Les Éditions de la Colombe, 1951)
- La Source grecque (Gallimard [Espoir], 1953)
- Oppression et Liberté (Gallimard [Espoir], 1955)
- Venise sauvée : Tragédie en trois actes (Gallimard, 1955)
- Écrits de Londres et dernières lettres (Gallimard [Espoir], 1957)
- Écrits historiques et politiques (Gallimard [Espoir], 1960)
- Pensées sans ordre concernant l'amour de Dieu (Gallimard [Espoir], 1962)
- Sur la science (Gallimard [Espoir], 1966)
- Poèmes, suivi de Venise sauvée (Gallimard [Espoir], 1968)
- Note sur la suppression générale des partis politiques (Paris: Éditions Gallimard, 1957 - Climats, 2006)

=== Works in English translation ===
- A Life in Letters. Robert Chenavier & André A. Devaux, eds. Translated by Nicholas Elliott. Cambridge, MA: The Belknap Press of Harvard University Press, 2024. ISBN 978-0-674-29237-6.
- Simone Weil: Basic Writings. Translated and edited by D.K. Levy and M. Barabas. London: Routledge, 2024. ISBN 978-1-032-07211-1.
- Awaiting God: A New Translation of Attente de Dieu and Lettre a un Religieux. Introduction by Sylvie Weil. Translated by Bradley Jersak. Fresh Wind Press, 2012. ISBN 978-1-927512-03-6.
- First and Last Notebooks: Supernatural Knowledge. Translated by Richard Rees. Eugene, OR: Wipf & Stock, 2015.
- Formative Writings: 1929–1941. (1987). Dorothy Tuck McFarland & Wilhelmina Van Ness, eds. University of Massachusetts Press.
- The Iliad or the Poem of Force. Translated by Mary McCarthy. Pendle Hill Pamphlet.
- Intimations of Christianity among the Ancient Greeks. Translated by Elisabeth Chase Geissbuhler. New York: Routledge, 1998.
- Lectures on Philosophy. Translated by Hugh Price. Cambridge: Cambridge University Press, 1978.
- Letter to a Priest. Translated by Arthur Willis. New York: Routledge, 2002.
- The Need for Roots: Prelude to a Declaration of Duties Towards Mankind. Translated by Arthur Willis. New York: Routledge, 2002.
- The Need for Roots: Prelude to a Declaration of Obligations Towards the Human Being. Introduction by Dr. Kate Kirkpatrick. Translated by Ros Schwartz. Penguin Classics, 2024. ISBN 978-0-241-46797-8.
- Gravity and Grace. Edited by Gustave Thibon. Translated by Arthur Willis. Lincoln: University of Nebraska Press, 1997.
- The Notebooks of Simone Weil. Routledge paperback, 1984. ISBN 0-7100-8522-2 [Routledge 2004. ISBN 978-0-415-32771-8]
- On Science, Necessity, & The Love of God. Translated by Richard Rees. London: Oxford University Press, 1968.
- On the Abolition of All Political Parties. Translated by Simon Leys. New York: The New York Review of Books, 2013.
- Oppression and Liberty. Edited by Albert Camus. Translated by Arthur Willis and John Petrie. Amherst: University of Massachusetts Press, 1973.
- Selected Essays, 1934–1943: Historical, Political and Moral Writings. Edited and translated by Richard Rees. Eugene, OR: Wipf & Stock, 2015.
- Seventy Letters: Personal and Intellectual Windows on a Thinker. Translated by Richard Rees. Eugene, OR: Wipf & Stock, 2015.
- Simone Weil's The Iliad or Poem of Force: A Critical Edition. Edited and translated by James P. Holoka. Peter Lang, 2005.
- Simone Weil: An Anthology. Sian Miles, editor. Virago Press, 1986.
- The Simone Weil Reader: A Legendary Spiritual Odyssey of Our Time. Edited by George A. Panichas. David McKay Co., 1981.
- Two Moral Essays by Simone Weil—Draft for a Statement of Human Obligations & Human Personality. Edited by Ronald Hathaway. Translated by Richard Rees. Pendle Hill Pamphlet, 1981.
- Simone Weil on Colonialism: An Ethic of the Other. Edited and translated by J. P. Little. Lanham: Rowman and Littlefield Publishers. 2003.
- Waiting for God. Translated by Emma Craufurd. New York: HarperPerennial, 2009.
- Venice Saved. Translated by Silvia Panizza and Philip Wilson. New York: Bloomsbury, 2019.

== See also ==
- Asceticism
- Christian anarchism
- Christian existentialism
- Liberation theology
- Moral obligation
- Mystical theology
- Apophatic theology
- Personalism
- Political theology
- Theodicy

== Sources ==
- Allen, Diogenes. (2006) Three Outsiders: Pascal, Kierkegaard, Simone Weil. Eugene, OR: Wipf and Stock.
- Arnswald, Ulrich. (2024)Totalitarianism in the Work of Simone Weil: Insights from an Early Confrontation, Atlantika: Revista Internacional de Filosofia. Revista de Filosofia do Centro Atlântico de Pesquisa em Humanidades (CAPH), Vol. II, no. 01, 2024, 96–109, ISSN 2965-6257.
- Bell, Richard H. (1998) Simone Weil. Rowman & Littlefield.
- ———, editor. (1993) Simone Weil's Philosophy of Culture: Readings Toward a Divine Humanity. Cambridge University Press. ISBN 0-521-43263-4
- Bourgault, Sophie, & Daigle, Julie. (Eds.). (2020). Simone Weil, Beyond Ideology? Palgrave Macmillan.
- Castelli, Alberto, "The Peace Discourse in Europe 1900–1945, Routledge, 2019.
- Cha, Yoon Sook. (2017). Decreation and the Ethical Bind: Simone Weil and the Claim of the Other. Fordham University Press.
- Chenavier, Robert. (2012) Simone Weil: Attention to the Real, trans. Bernard E. Doering. Notre Dame, IN: University of Notre Dame.
- Davies, Grahame. (2007) Everything Must Change. Seren. ISBN 978-1-85411-451-8
- Dietz, Mary. (1988). Between the Human and the Divine: The Political Thought of Simone Weil. Rowman & Littlefield.
- Doering, E. Jane. (2010) Simone Weil and the Specter of Self-Perpetuating Force. University of Notre Dame Press.
- Doering, E. Jane, and Eric O. Springsted, eds. (2004) The Christian Platonism of Simone Weil. University of Notre Dame Press.
- Esposito, Roberto. (2017). The Origin of the Political: Hannah Arendt or Simone Weil? (V. Binetti & G. Williams, Trans.). Fordham University Press.
- Finch, Henry Leroy. (1999) Simone Weil and the Intellect of Grace, ed. Martin Andic, Introduction by Annie Finch. Continuum International.
- Gabellieri, Emmanuel. (2003) Etre et don: L'unite et l'enjeu de la pensée de Simone Weil. Paris: Peeters.
- Goldschläger, Alain. (1982) Simone Weil et Spinoza: Essai d'interprétation. Québec: Naaman.
- Guilherme, Alexandre and Morgan, W. John, 2018, 'Simone Weil (1909–1943)-dialogue as an instrument of power', Chapter 7 in Philosophy, Dialogue, and Education: Nine modern European philosophers, Routledge, London and New York, pp. 109–126. ISBN 978-1-138-83149-0.
- Irwin, Alexander. (2002) Saints of the Impossible: Bataille, Weil, and the Politics of the Sacred. Minneapolis: University of Minnesota Press.
- McCullough, Lissa. (2014) The Religious Philosophy of Simone Weil. London: I. B. Tauris. ISBN 978-1-78076-796-3
- Morgan, Vance G. (2005) Weaving the World: Simone Weil on Science, Mathematics, and Love. University of Notre Dame Press. ISBN 0-268-03486-9
- Morgan, W. John, 2019, Simone Weil's Lectures on Philosophy: A comment, RUDN Journal of Philosophy, 23 (4) 420–429. DOI: 10.22363/2313-2302-2019-23-4-420-429.
- Morgan, W. John, 2020, 'Simone Weil's 'Reflections on the Right Use of School Studies with a View to the Love of God': A Comment', RUDN Journal of Philosophy, 24 (3), 398–409.DOI: 10.22363/2313-2302-2020-24-3-398-409.
- Moulakis, Athanasios (1998) Simone Weil and the Politics of Self-Denial, trans. Ruth Hein. University of Missouri Press. ISBN 0-8262-1162-3
- Panizza, Silvia Caprioglio. (2022). The Ethics of Attention: Engaging the Real with Iris Murdoch and Simone Weil. Routledge.
- Plant, Stephen. (2007) Simone Weil: A Brief Introduction, Orbis, ISBN 978-1-57075-753-2
- ———. (2007) The SPCK Introduction to Simone Weil, SPCK, ISBN 978-0-281-05938-6
- Radzins, Inese Astra (2006) Thinking Nothing: Simone Weil's Cosmology. ProQuest/UMI.
- Rhees, Rush. (2000) Discussions of Simone Weil. State University of New York Press.
- Rozelle-Stone, A. Rebecca. (Ed.). (2019). Simone Weil and Continental Philosophy. Rowman & Littlefield.
- Rozelle-Stone, A. Rebecca and Lucian Stone. (2013) Simone Weil and Theology. New York: Bloomsbury T & T Clark.
- ———, eds. (2009) Relevance of the Radical: Simone Weil 100 Years Later. New York: T & T Clark.
- Springsted, Eric O. (2010). Simone Weil and the Suffering of Love. Wipf & Stock.
- ———. (2021). Simone Weil for the Twenty-First Century. University of Notre Dame Press.
- Veto, Miklos. (1994) The Religious Metaphysics of Simone Weil, trans. Joan Dargan. State University of New York Press.
- von der Ruhr, Mario. (2006) Simone Weil: An Apprenticeship in Attention. London: Continuum.
- Winch, Peter. (1989) Simone Weil: "The Just Balance." Cambridge University Press.
- Winchell, James. (2000) 'Semantics of the Unspeakable: Six Sentences by Simone Weil,' in: "Trajectories of Mysticism in Theory and Literature", Philip Leonard, ed. London: Macmillan, 72–93. ISBN 0-333-72290-6
- Zaretsky, Robert. (2021). The Subversive Simone Weil: A Life in Five Ideas. University of Chicago Press.
- ———. (2020) "The Logic of the Rebel: On Simone Weil and Albert Camus," Los Angeles Review of Books.
- ———. (2018) "What We Owe to Others: Simone Weil's Radical Reminder," New York Times.

=== Biographies ===
- Anderson, David. (1971). Simone Weil. SCM Press.
- Cabaud, Jacques. (1964). Simone Weil. Channel Press.
- Coles, Robert (1989) Simone Weil: A Modern Pilgrimage. Addison-Wesley. 2001 ed., Skylight Paths Publishing.
- Fiori, Gabriella (1989) Simone Weil: An Intellectual Biography. translated by Joseph R. Berrigan. University of Georgia Press. ISBN 0-8203-1102-2
- ———, (1991) Simone Weil. Una donna assoluta, La Tartaruga; Saggistica. ISBN 88-7738-075-6
- ———, (1993) Simone Weil. Une Femme Absolue Diffuseur-SODIS. ISBN 2-86645-148-1
- Gray, Francine Du Plessix (2001) Simone Weil. Viking Press.
- McLellan, David (1990) Utopian Pessimist: The Life and Thought of Simone Weil. New York: Poseidon Press.
- Nevin, Thomas R. (1991). Simone Weil: Portrait of a Self-Exiled Jew. Chapel Hill.
- Perrin, J.B. & Thibon, G. (1953). Simone Weil as We Knew Her. Routledge & Kegan Paul.
- Pétrement, Simone (1976) Simone Weil: A Life. New York: Schocken Books. 1988 edition.
- Plessix Gray, Francine du. (2001). Simone Weil. Penguin.
- Rexroth, Kenneth (1957) Simone Weil http://www.bopsecrets.org/rexroth/essays/simone-weil.htm
- Guia Risari (2014) Il taccuino di Simone Weil, RueBallu 2014, Palermo, ISBN 978-88-95689-15-9
- Sogos Wiquel, Giorgia (2022) "Simone Weil. Private Überlegungen". Bonn, Free Pen Verlag. ISBN 978-3-945177-95-2.
- Terry, Megan (1973). Approaching Simone: A Play. The Feminist Press.
- White, George A., ed. (1981). Simone Weil: Interpretations of a Life. University of Massachusetts Press.
- Yourgrau, Palle. (2011) Simone Weil. Critical Lives series. London: Reaktion.
- Weil, Sylvie. (2010) At home with André and Simone Weil. Evanston: Northwestern.
- "Simone Weil: A Saint for Our Time?" magazine article by Jillian Becker; The New Criterion, Vol. 20, March 2002.

=== Audio recordings ===
- David Cayley, Enlightened by Love: The Thought of Simone Weil. CBC Audio (2002)
- "In Our Time" documentary on Weil, BBC Radio 4 (2015)
