= Jean Ballard =

French poet, author and editor

- Born: 14 November 1893; Marseille, France
- Died: 18 June 1973 (aged 79); Marseille, France
- Occupation(s): Poet, author, editor

Jean Ballard (14 November 1893 – 18 June 1973) was a French poet, writer and editor.

== Early life ==
Jean Ballard was born in Marseille, France. He grew up in Marseille and passed his Baccalaureate, specialising in mathematics.

== Career ==
Ballard began his writing career with Fortunio, a literary review founded by author Marcel Pagnol. He was the founder and editor of Les Cahiers du Sud from 1925 to 1966.

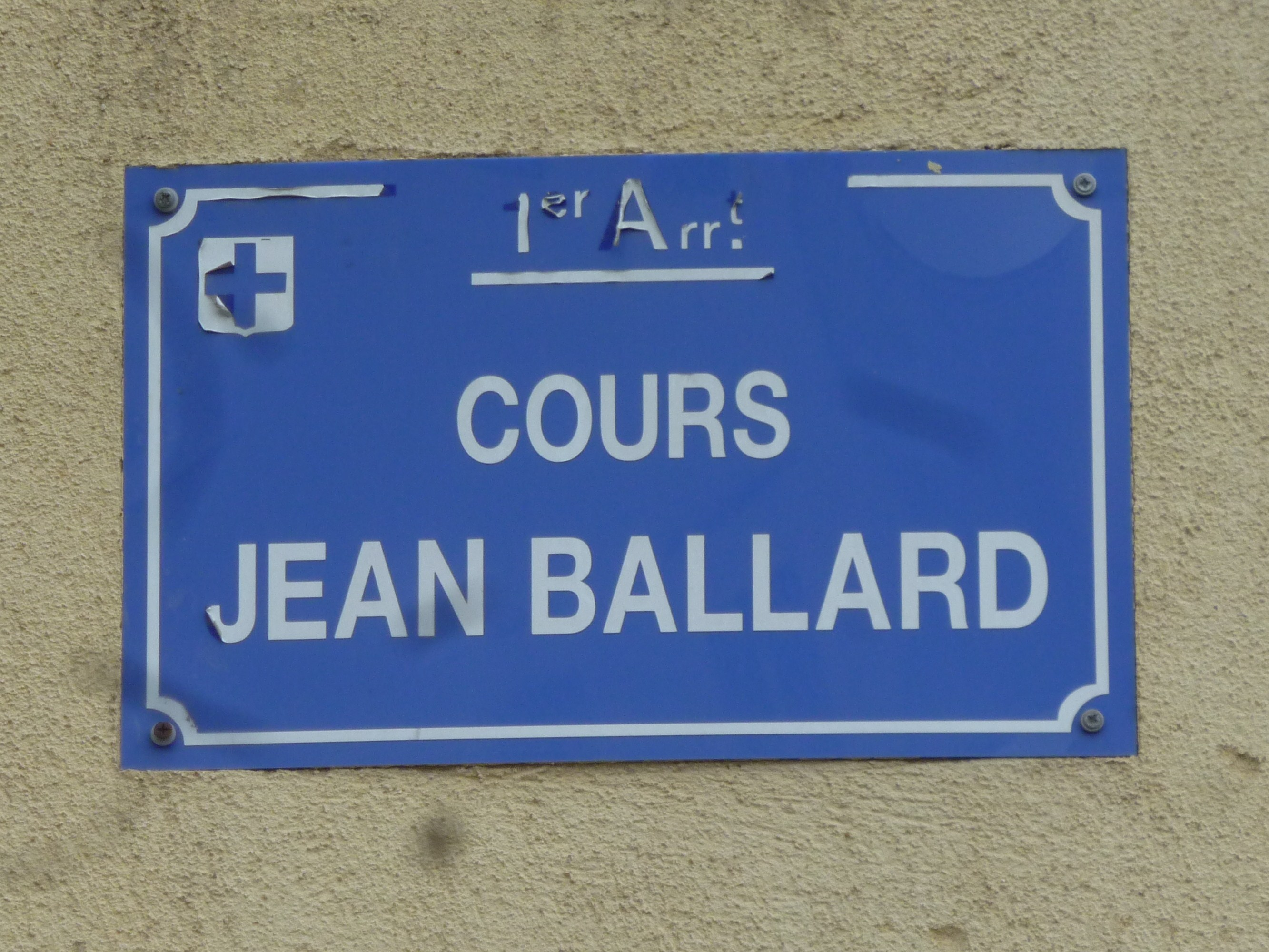
Street sign.

== Death and legacy ==
Ballard died in 1973 in his hometown of Marseille. He was 79 years old. The Cours Jean Ballard in the 1st arrondissement of Marseille was named in his honour.
