= Metaxy =

Concept in Platonic philosophy

Metaxy (Greek: μεταξύ, also used as metaxú, 'between') is a concept originating in Platonic philosophy, developed by Neoplatonic philosophers such as Plotinus. Several philosophers in the twentieth-century repurposed the concept, such as Eric Voegelin, Simone Weil, and William Desmond.

Neoplatonists like Plotinus used the concept to express an ontological placement of Man between the Gods and animals.

Metaxy as used by Voegelin refers to the permanent place where man is in-between two poles of existence. One example is the infinite (apeiron) and the finite (the divine mind or nous) reality of existence. Another example is between the beginning of existence (apeiron) and the beyond existence (epekeina). Voegelin defined metaxy as the connection of the mind or nous to the material world and the reverse of the material world's connection to the mind as "consciousness of being". Under Voegelin's definition it can also mean a form of perception in contrast to consciousness; a template of the mind (or nous) in contrast to the dynamic and unordered flow of experiential consciousness; or as a form of reflectiveness in-between two poles of experience (the finite and the infinite, or immanent and transcendent). Metaxy is man's connection to the material world as the ground of being.

The concept is also used by Simone Weil, who argued that compassion must act in the area of metaxy.

Metaxy is also a central concept in the thought of the contemporary Irish philosopher William Desmond. Desmond's trilogy of books on 'the between' in relation to ontology, ethics, and philosophy of religion develops what he calls 'metaxological' thought which places the in-between state of the human subject at the heart of metaphysical thinking.

The "meta" in metamodernism, a proposed term for a post-postmodernist paradigm, comes from "metaxy."

== Bibliography ==
- Navia, Luis E., Socrates, the man and his philosophy, pp. 30, 171. University Press of America ISBN 0-8191-4854-7.
- Cooper, John M. & Hutchinson, D. S. (Eds.) (1997). Plato: Complete Works, Hackett Publishing Co., Inc. ISBN 0-87220-349-2.
- Micael P. Federici, Eric Voegelin The Restoration of Order (2002) ISI Books ISBN 1-882926-74-9
- Steel, Sean. (2014). The Pursuit of Wisdom and Happiness in Education: Historical Sources and Contemplative Practices. New York: SUNY Press. ISBN 978-1-4384-5213-5
