= Ulrich Arnswald =

German philosopher and economist (born 1970)

Ulrich Arnswald (born 1970 in Karlsruhe) is a German philosopher, economist, political scientist, and university lecturer. He is a Privatdozent at the Institute of Philosophy at the Leopold-Franzens-University in Innsbruck, Austria.

== Biography ==
Raised in Ettlingen (Baden), where he also completed his secondary education, Arnswald pursued studies in economics, political science, and philosophy at the Ruprecht Karl University of Heidelberg, the Université Paris-Dauphine, the University of Kent in Canterbury, and the London School of Economics and Political Science (LSE), one of the 17 member institutions of the federal University of London. He was awarded his doctorate summa cum laude from the Karlsruhe Institute of Technology (KIT). Arnswald has held professional roles at Eisai Co. Ltd. in Tokyo and the German-Irish Chamber of Industry and Commerce in Dublin. He has undertaken research and served as a visiting lecturer at several academic institutions, including St. Catharine's College, University of Cambridge (1999), the Middle East Technical University in Ankara (2001), the Wittgenstein Archive at the University of Bergen (2003), the University of Oslo (2004), the International Research Center for Social and Ethical Questions (ifz) in Salzburg (2014), the Bauhaus-University Weimar and the Buchenwald and Mittelbau-Dora Memorials Foundation (2019), and the Brenner Archive Research Institute, Ernst von Glasersfeld Archive Department, at the Leopold-Franzens University Innsbruck (2021). Between 1997 and 2006, Arnswald served as founding director of the European Institute for International Affairs Heidelberg (now known as the Institute for Cultural Research Heidelberg). He received teaching appointments in economics, business administration, international relations, and philosophy at institutions in Heidelberg, Bruchsal, and Darmstadt. In 2000, he was awarded the title of Assistant Professor by Schiller International University, Florida, United States (today: The Global American University, Schiller). In 2005, he led compact seminars for Oglethorpe University (Atlanta, Georgia) in Strasbourg, France.

Until 2020, Arnswald held roles as a lecturer, research associate, and academic staff member at the Karlsruhe Institute of Technology (KIT) and its predecessor, the University of Karlsruhe (TH). His teaching there was primarily focused on the European Culture and History of Ideas (EUKLID) program, particularly in the area of practical philosophy. Since 2023, he has taught philosophy at the University of Kaiserslautern-Landau (Rheinland-Pfälzische Technische Universität Kaiserslautern-Landau). In 2023, in cooperation with Dr. Joaquín Jareño Alarcón (Murcia), he initiated the European Initiative for Online Tandem Higher Education for Ukraine (via Virtual Learning Environments). This initiative was supported by the Ministry of Education and Science of Ukraine, and the first tandem seminars aimed at supporting Ukrainian higher education during wartime commenced in 2024.

== Philosophical work ==
Arnswald's academic focus lies in political philosophy and political economy, the history of ideas, philosophy of language, Enlightenment philosophy, and the tradition of pragmatism, as well as philosophical anthropology. His work also includes ethical issues, especially at the intersection of philosophy and economics, and touches on epistemological concerns informed by pragmatist traditions. Arnswald is a recognized specialist on the philosophy of Ludwig Wittgenstein and has also conducted extensive research on the Vienna Circle as a continuation of his Wittgensteinian scholarship

== Notable Contributions in Science and Research ==
Ulrich Arnswald has made significant contributions to science and research through various roles in academia and scientific organizations:

- 1997–2006: Founding Director of the European Institute for International Affairs (now known as [Institute for Cultural Research](https://www.kulturforschung-hd.de/start.html)), Heidelberg, Germany.
- 2002–2004: Served as Scientific Correspondent for the [Iablis – Jahrbuch für Europäische Prozesse] (Yearbook for European Processes).
- 2005–2009: Member of the Scientific Advisory Board for Iablis – Jahrbuch für Europäische Prozesse.
- Since 2023: Member of the International Editorial Board of the [Sofia Philosophical Review](https://sphr-bg.org/home.html), a journal dedicated to moral, political, and social philosophy from a continental perspective.

Arnswald has received several distinctions in recognition of his contributions to public discourse and historical education. In October 2003, he was awarded the third prize in the Science Category of the federal competition "What's the Point of Taxes? – The Tension between Necessity and Acceptance" by the Federal Ministry of the Interior in Berlin.

Earlier, in 1992, he received the Demokratisch Handeln award for the publication of a documentary on the Holocaust in the region of Baden. The award was conferred by the Theodor-Heuss-Stiftung and the Akademie für Bildung in Stuttgart and Tübingen.

== Selected publications ==
Ulrich Arnswald has made significant contributions to the fields of philosophy, political theory, and the history of ideas. His scholarly work encompasses a wide range of topics, including Wittgenstein's philosophy, political philosophy, applied ethics, and the philosophy of language. Arnswald's publications include both solo and edited volumes, often collaborating with other leading scholars in the field. Below is a selection of his notable works:

- Das Problem der normativen Grundlagen der modernen Ökonomie. Über die nicht reflektierten Prämissen ökonomischer Theoriebildung. Postdoctoral Thesis (Habilitation), University Publication, Faculty of Philosophy and History, Innsbruck: Leopold-Franzens-Universität, 2023.
- Ludwig Wittgenstein – Universalgenie, Genie oder Generalist? Ein Leben ruhelosen Denkens (Ed. together with Ilse Somavilla). Innsbruck: Innsbruck University Press, 2022. ISBN 978-3-99106-083-3.
- Der Wiener Kreis – Aktualität in Wissenschaft, Literatur, Architektur und Kunst (Ed. together with Friedrich Stadler and Peter Weibel). Wien: LIT Verlag, 2019. ISBN 978-3643509376.
- Jan Sokol: Philosophie als Verpflichtung (Ed. together with Ondřej Skripnik). Heidelberg, 2014. ISBN 978-3-944512-02-0.
- Wittgenstein als politischer Denker. Konzepte politischen Denkens in einer unpolitischen Philosophie. Inaugural Dissertation for the Award of the Doctorate (PhD Thesis), Faculty of Humanities and Social Sciences, University Publication, Karlsruhe: Karlsruhe Institute of Technology (KIT), 2013. DNB-IDN 1105390055.
- Hermeneutik und die Grenzen der Sprache (Ed. together with Louise Röska-Hardy and Jens Kertscher). Heidelberg: Manutius, 2012. ISBN 978-3-934877-94-8.
- Rationalität und Irrationalität in den Wissenschaften (Ed. together with Hans-Peter Schütt). Wiesbaden: VS Verlag für Sozialwissenschaften, 2011. ISBN 978-3-531-18269-8.
- Thomas Morus’ Utopia und das Genre der Utopie in der Politischen Philosophie (Ed. together with Hans-Peter Schütt). Karlsruhe, 2010. ISBN 978-3-866444-03-4.
- In Search of Meaning: Ludwig Wittgenstein on Ethics, Mysticism and Religion (Ed.). Karlsruhe: Universitätsverlag Karlsruhe, 2009. ISBN 978-3-866442-18-4.
- Die Zukunft der Geisteswissenschaften (Ed.). Heidelberg: Manutius Verlag, 2005. ISBN 3-934877-33-8.
- Wittgenstein und die Metapher (Ed. together with Jens Kertscher and Matthias Kroß). Berlin: Parerga Verlag, 2004. ISBN 3-937262-14-8.
- Die Autonomie des Politischen und die Instrumentalisierung der Ethik (Ed. together with Jens Kertscher). Heidelberg: Manutius Verlag, 2002. ISBN 3-934877-16-8.
- Herausforderungen der Angewandten Ethik (Ed. together with Jens Kertscher). Paderborn: Mentis, 2002. ISBN 3-89785-130-X.
- Gadamer's Century: Essays in Honor of Hans-Georg Gadamer (Ed. together with Jens Kertscher and Jeff Malpas). Cambridge, MA; London, England: MIT Press, 2002. ISBN 0-262-13403-9, 0-262-63247-0 (Hardcover and Paperback).
- Der Denker als Seiltänzer. Ludwig Wittgenstein über Religion, Mystik und Ethik (Ed. together with Anja Weiberg). Düsseldorf: Parerga Verlag, 2001. ISBN 3-930450-67-4.
- Sind die Deutschen ausländerfeindlich? (Ed. together with Heiner Geißler, Sabine Leutheusser-Schnarrenberger, and Wolfgang Thierse). Zürich; München: Pendo Verlag, 2000. ISBN 3-85842-389-0 (1st and 2nd editions).
- Hirschman's Theory of Exit, Voice, and Loyalty Reconsidered. Heidelberg: European Institute for International Affairs, 1997. ISBN 3-933179-00-9.

== See also ==
- German philosophy
