= Les Cahiers du Sud =

French literary magazine

Les Cahiers du Sud (literally “The Southern Notebooks”) was a French literary journal published in Marseille.

It was founded in 1914, as Fortunio, by the teenage Marcel Pagnol, although publication ended a few months later at the outbreak of the Great War. Pagnol restarted it in 1920 in Aix-en-Provence, before moving it back to Marseille the next year. It was taken over and renamed by Jean Ballard in 1925, and published, under his direction, until 1966.

== History and profile ==
Through the poet André Gaillard (1898–1929), the magazine published surrealist writers like René Crevel, Paul Éluard and Benjamin Péret, and ex-surrealists like Antonin Artaud, Robert Desnos. Others published in the magazine included Henri Michaux, Michel Leiris, René Daumal, Pierre Jean Jouve and Pierre Reverdy. Cahiers du Sud also published the poetry of Joë Bousquet. Other contributors included Gabriel Audisio, René Nelli, Simone Weil, Benjamin Fondane, Jean Audard, Marguerite Yourcenar, Walter Benjamin and Paul Valéry.

In 1945 Ballard drew up a new editorial board with Jean Tortel and Pierre Guerre.

== Sources ==
- Brun-Franc, Christel (2015). "Jean Ballard, une figure du « travailleur intellectuel »". Rives méditerranéennes (in French) (50). Aix-en-Provence: 119–130. doi:10.4000/rives.4847. ISSN 2103-4001 – via OpenEdition Journals.
- Le Vagueresse, Emmanuel (2018). "España en la revista literaria francesa Cahiers du Sud entre 1924-1936". Studia Iberystyczne (in Spanish) (17). Krakow: Institute of Romance Studies, Jagiellonian University: 73–82. doi:10.12797/SI.17.2018.17.05. ISSN 2082-8594.
- Pagnol, Marcel (2015). "Jean Balard (1893-1973) et la bande de Fortunio". In Pagnol, Nicolas; Dehayes, Thierry (eds.). Je te souhaite beaucoup d’ennemis comme moi (Correspondence) (in French). Paris: Robert Laffont. pp. 89–131. ISBN 978-2-221-20327-9.
- Paire, Alain (1993). Chronique des Cahiers du Sud (1914-1966) (in French). Paris: IMEC Éditions. ISBN 2-908295-17-2.
- Paire, Alain (2015). "Les Cahiers du Sud, un style de vie". Rives méditerranéennes (in French) (50). Aix-en-Provence: 147–153. doi:10.4000/rives.4862. ISSN 2103-4001 – via OpenEdition Journals.
- Polycandrioti, Ourania (2015). "Groupes d'intellectuels en France et en Grèce dans l'entre-deux-guerres. Chemins parallèles ?". Rives méditerranéennes (in French) (50). Aix-en-Provence: 131–144. doi:10.4000/rives.4855. ISSN 2103-4001 – via OpenEdition Journals.
- Table of contents: "Les sommaires des Cahiers du Sud (1914-1966)" (PDF) (in French). Marseille: Bibliothèques de Marseille. 1993.
