= Jean Audard =

French poet and critic (1913–1998)

Jean Audard (20 March 1913 – 19 March 1998) was a French poet and critic.

== Life ==
In the late 1920s, he cofounded a poetry magazine Rationale (1928-1930) with other young poets, as well as founding Zarathoustra, a more philosophical journal. Around this time he became a correspondent of Oscar Milosz.

In the 1930s he was a contributor to Cahiers du Sud, and joined others associated with Surrealism in anti-Fascist efforts. An essay by Audard on the extent to which psychoanalysis was materialist drew heavy criticism from Georges Politzer for the 'bootlegging Bergsonianism' of its 'Freudo-Marxism'. He wrote for the wartime (1939-1946) poetry magazine Messages. After the death of Oscar Milosc he became Director of the Friends of Milosz, established in 1966.

He had three children. Elsa is a psychoanalyst in Paris. Frédéric, the youngest, created his own communication agency in the East of France. And his second daughter is Catherine Audard, a philosopher and translator of John Rawls.

== Works ==
- 'Hécate de Jouve', Cahiers du Sud (April 1929), pp. 231–3
- 'Bergson : les Deux Sources de la morale et de la religion', Cahiers du Sud (June 1932)
- 'La Psychanalyse et le destin de la Poésie', Cahiers du Sud 144 (October 1932)
- Review of Oswald Spengler's Decline of the West, Cahiers du Sud, 1932
- 'Du caractère matérialiste de la psychanalyse', Cahiers du Sud 154 (September 1933), pp. 517–528.
- 'La poésie et les événements', Cahiers du Sud 166 (November 1934), pp. 725–31
- 'La crise de l'idéalisme romantique dans la philosophie de Schopenhauer', in Cahiers du Sud 194 (May–June 1937), ed. Georges Camille as Le Romantisme Allemand
- 'Blake et la Revolution', Messages 1 (1939), p. 15-19
- 'Le modernisme de Coleridge', in Nestor Miserez et al., ed., Le Romantisme Anglais, 1946
- (tr.) 'Le poème de l'Ancien Marin (fragment)' by Samuel Taylor Coleridge, in Nestor Miserez et al., ed., Le Romantisme Anglais, 1946
- 'Sur l'influence de Mallarmé', in Jean Audard & Pierre Missac, ed., Stephane Mallarme: Inédits, poèmes et lettres, études, Paris: Les Lettres, 1948
- Le Poete de l'ame, in O. V. de L. Milosz (1877-1939), Paris: Éditions André Silvaire, 1959, p. 84
- 'Hommage à Jean Cassou', Cahiers De l'Association Les Amis de Milosz 25 (1986)
