= Letter to a Priest =

"Letter to a Priest" (French: Lettre à un religieux) is a letter containing thirty-five "expressions of opinion on matters concerning Catholic faith, dogma and institutions" by the French religious and social philosopher and mystic Simone Weil. It was first published in 1951 by Gallimard, and an English edition followed in 1953. It has since been republished several times in book form.

Weil: "When I read The Catechism of the Council of Trent, it seems as though I had nothing in common with the religion there set forth. [...] I am going to enumerate for you a certain number of thoughts which have dwelt in me for years (some of them at least) and which form a barrier between me and the Church."

Weil scholar George Panichas writes that the letter reflects Weil's profound disagreement with official Catholic dogma, but also shows that her heart belongs to the Church.

The letter was addressed to a French priest living in New York, the Dominican Fr. Édouard Couturier, when Simone Weil herself was staying there in the autumn of 1942. She was anxious at this time to return to Europe to join the Free French Movement of Charles de Gaulle in London, even wishing to be parachuted into France to aid the French Resistance.
