= Sting of Death =

- Original promotional artwork
- Directed by: William Grefé
- Written by: William Kerwin (as Al Dempsey)
- Produced by: Joseph Fink; Richard S. Flink; Juan Hildago-Gato
- Starring: Joe Morrison; Deanna Lund; Valerie Hawkins; John Vella; Jack Nagle
- Cinematography: Julio C. Chávez
- Production company: Essen Productions Inc.
- Release date: October 21, 1966
- Running time: 80 minutes
- Country: United States
- Language: English

Sting of Death is a 1966 American science fiction horror film directed by William Grefé, written by William Kerwin (credited as Al Dempsey), and starring Joe Morrison, Valerie Hawkins, Deanna Lund, John Vella, and Jack Nagle. Its plot concerns five female college students who head to the Florida Everglades for a holiday, but instead of fun in the sun, run into trouble with a mutated, bloodthirsty, and quite deadly jellyfish-man-monster.

Neil Sedaka's pop dance song "Do the Jellyfish" is featured on the film's soundtrack. Sting of Death was paired on a double bill with the Grefé film Death Curse of Tartu (1966).

== Plot ==
Ruth, sunbathing on a dock in Florida, hears a radio news report about unexplained local murders. Then a monstrous hand reaches up from the water and grabs her ankle, dragging her under, where she drowns.

Meanwhile, five of six college friends arrive at the home of Dr. Richardson, who is the father of one of them, Karen. Richardson is a marine biologist who studies the "evolution of sea life" with his assistant, Dr. John Hoyt. Karen and the others—Louise, Jessica, Donna, and Susan—are staying at Dr. Richardson's house. They all wonder why Ruth, who had gotten there earlier, has not joined them.

Several raucous college students who have been invited to a pool party show up by boat. They taunt Richardson's mildly facially-disfigured helper Egon, who is secretly in love with Karen; however, Karen has fallen for John. Egon sets out to take revenge for all the wrongs done him by turning himself into a half-man half-jellyfish monster. He picks off the girls one by one: Ruth was the woman killed while sunbathing; Louise is seriously injured in an attack in the pool during the party; Donna dies while being chased through a swamp; Jessica is killed during the search for Donna; and Susan is murdered while showering. Many of the other students die when their boat sinks—the monster has chopped a hole in its hull with an axe—and they are attacked by a school of Portuguese man o' war.

Egon takes Karen to his secret laboratory in an underwater cave. There, he shows her an enormous Portuguese man o' war in an aquarium that is connected to the machine he uses to transform himself from man to monster. John fatally injures the now-transformed Egon during a fight and rescues Karen. Just as she and John surface, the machine explodes, finishing off Egon.

== Cast ==
- Joe Morrison as Dr. John Hoyt
- Valerie Hawkins as Karen Richardson
- John Vella as Egon
- Jack Nagle as Dr. Richardson
- Sandy Lee Kane as Louise
- Deanna Lund as Jessica
- Barbara Paridon as 1st Girl
- Lois Etelman as Donna
- Judy Lee as Ruth
- Blanche Devreaux as Susan
- Doug Hobart as The Jellyfish Man

== Production ==
Sting of Death is a regional horror film, following film historian Brian Albright's definition. Regional films in general "were conceived, produced and often distributed entirely in corners of the country not typically associated with the entertainment industry—from the backwoods of Utah to the bayous of Louisiana to the outer boroughs of New York. Made with little regard to genre convention, or in some cases even any basic knowledge of filmmaking, by the 1970s"—just a few years after Sting of Death was made—"these regional indies were at the vanguard of horror cinema." Such films were made on low budgets with actors (often amateurs) and crews who were local to the shooting location. In this movie the Everglades and nearby locations in southern Florida were used as exteriors, while interior filming was done at the home of producer Flink. Underwater sequences were shot at Rainbow Springs, the same site used for Creature from the Black Lagoon (1954).

Although listed in the credits as "Special Singing Guest Star", Sedaka is not visible in the movie. He is only heard singing "Do the Jellyfish" as the students perform the dance during the pool party. The song is included on the Sedaka LP Oh Carol: The Complete Recordings, 1955–66, released on Bear Family Records in 2003.

== Release ==
In the U. S., the double bill of Death Curse of Tartu and Sting of Death "played nationwide in 1967 and did fairly well," according to "actor/stuntman/amateur makeup artist Doug Hobart." For release in the U. K., Sting of Death was granted an X-certificate by the BBFC on June 10, 1968. The U. K. version of the film was cut to a running time of 78 minutes 13 seconds, although details of the exact nature of the cuts are not available. The X-cert meant the film could only be shown to persons age 16 or older. The film was distributed in the U. S. by Thunderbird International Pictures to help fulfill an annual need for inexpensive horror double features which were timed to coincide with April 15, the traditional season opening of drive-ins in the northern part of the country. U. K. distribution was handled by Border Films.

=== Home media ===
Sting of Death was released for home viewing in 2001 as a VHS single film and on DVD as a double feature with Death Curse of Tartu. Both were distributed by Something Weird Video.

A new restoration of the movie by Arrow Films premiered at the Fantasia Film Festival in Montréal, Quebec, Canada, which ran August 20 through September 2, 2020.

The restored Sting of Death was included in the Blu-ray box set He Came from the Swamp: The William Grefé Collection, released on November 23, 2020. The other films in the set are Death Curse of Tartu, The Hooked Generation (1968), The Psychedelic Priest (1971), The Naked Zoo (1971), Mako: The Jaws of Death (1976), Whiskey Mountain (1978), and They Came from the Swamp, an updated version of the 2009 documentary about Grefé and his movies.

Sting of Death is currently on Tubi.

In 2026, Sting of Death was one of four titles featured as part of Mystery Science Theater 3000: The RiffTrax Experiments.

== Reception ==
A 1967 review in BoxOffice says that the film is "very much in keeping with the youth-oriented horror market" of the time, well-made enough to earn a "good" rating—on its Very Good-to-Very Poor scale—and that Grefé "has generated a surprisingly strong mass market appeal pattern and, for good measure, headliner Neil Sedaka is present in the capacity of singing guest star." BoxOffice calls Morrison, Hawkins, and Vella "professionally poised in pivotal roles" and says that Nagle "provides some interesting moments."

On the other hand, film historian Phil Hardy has little positive to say about Sting of Death. He opines that Hawkins is a "wooden heroine" and Morrison a "hard-headed hero," and calls the film an "unimaginative piece of low-budget Science Fiction." TVGuide.com uses the similar phrase "mindless science fiction" in its brief description of the movie.

Critic Fred Beldin of Allmovie.com is even more damning. He writes that Sting of Death is a "peculiar sci-fi calamity," a movie that is "wrong-headed, absurd, and unintentionally funny" but one that will nonetheless "thrill lovers of trash cinema and confuse everyone else." He is of the opinion that Grefé "films the dance sequences with special attention paid to his female subjects' posteriors, suggesting an almost Russ Meyers-like appreciation of this portion" of their anatomy. Beldin also notes that the "succession of unlikely events and robotic actors" are all filmed "in blazing color." In an interview, Grefé attributes the latter to the "glare off the ocean [that] really lends itself to beautiful photography" and to "cameramen back then [who] believed in putting color in" as many shots as possible.

Besides writing that Sting of Death has an "overabundance of mundane dialogue and amateurish acting, film historian Bryan Senn makes special note of the Jellyfish Man costume. He quotes Hobart, the man inside the costume, as saying that "The monster suit cost about $300 to make" and took about two weeks to complete. However, Senn points out, "In fact, it looks just like what it really is—a man in a crusty, dirty wetsuit and flippers, with plastic cords hanging from his shoulders and a clear hefty bag inflated over his head." Grefé seems to agree with Senn, saying in an interview, "Now if you tried to release that in the theaters, they'd stone you to death in the lobby. Back in those days, it wasn't too bad. You could get away with a lot of stuff on the low-budget pictures."

== See also ==
- List of American films of 1966
