= Jennifer Bishop =

American actress (born 1941)

- Born: Alberta Bishop; 1941 (age 84–85); United States
- Other names: Jenifer Bishop, Barbara Bishop
- Occupation: Actress
- Years active: 1960s-1970s

Jennifer Bishop aka Jenifer Bishop (born 1941) is an American film and television actress who was active from the early 1960s through to the 1970s. She was a regular on the television series Hee Haw. She had various roles in film that include Blood of Dracula's Castle in 1969, The Female Bunch in 1969, Impulse in 1974, and Mako: The Jaws of Death in 1976.

== Background ==
She was born in 1941. Her parents were Albert and Marie. Being the first born she was named Alberta. She grew up in Camarillo, California and attended Camarillo High School. She then spent two years at Ventura College and her drama teacher there was a Dr. Wilkinson. After Ventura, she won a scholarship to go to Desilu Studios in Hollywood where she studied with Anthony Barr who would be an executive with ABC Studios. She studied method acting at Desilu Studios for two years before doing her first film. Her first film was Dime with a Halo which was directed by Boris Sagal. After that she went to New York for two years where she studied with Lee Strasberg.

== Career ==
=== Television ===
In 1967, Bishop appeared in the television series Mission Impossible, playing a hostess in the Astrologer episode. She was credited as Barbara Bishop. An original cast member, Bishop was one of the regulars in the Kornfield County based television series Hee Haw, that also featured with Slim Pickens, Barbi Benton etc. She appeared in episodes from the late 1960s through to the early 1970s. In 1975, she appeared in the series Cannon in The Deadly Conspiracy playing the part of Andrea Wayne.

Television list
Title	Episode #	Role	Director	Year	Notes #
Mission: Impossible	The Astrologer	Hostess	Lee H. Katzin	1967	
Hee Haw	various	Herself	various	1969 - 1971	48 episodes from 1969 to 1971
Cannon	The Deadly Conspiracy: Part 1	Andrea Wayne	Michael Caffey	1975	

=== Film ===
She appeared in the Bernard Girard directed 1969 film, The Mad Room, which was a remake of the 1941 film Ladies In Retirement. Shelley Winters, Stella Stevens and Severn Darden also starred in the film. She starred in the Sergei Goncharoff directed film House of Terror which was released around 1972/1973. In the film she played Jennifer Andrews, a nurse who is hired to look after a man's unwell wife. She has an ex-con former boyfriend who has ideas for the wealth of the woman. After the woman dies, she marries her husband. The ex-con boyfriend who is still in the periphery has plans to get hold of the money.

Around the mid-1970s, she co-starred with Richard Jaeckel in the film Mako: The Jaws of Death. In addition to her and Jaeckel in this "Jaws-similar" film, Harold Sakata and John Chandler also starred. The film was directed by William Grefe.

Film list
Title	Role	Director	Year	Notes #
Dime with a Halo	Stripper	Boris Sagal	1963	
The Mad Room	Mrs. Ericson	Bernard Girard	1969	as Jenifer Bishop
Blood of Dracula's Castle	Liz Arden	Al Adamson	1969	as Barbara Bishop
The Maltese Bippy	Joanna Clay	Norman Panama	1969	
Horror of the Blood Monsters	Lian Malian	Al Adamson	1970	
Bigfoot	Bobbi	Robert F. Slatzer	1970	as Jenifer Bishop
The Female Bunch	Grace	Al Adamson	1971	as Jenifer Bishop
Outlaw Riders	Maria	Tony Huston	1971	as Jenifer Bishop
House of Terror	Jennifer Andrews	Sergei Goncharoff	1973	
Impulse	Ann Moy	William Grefe	1974	
Jessi's Girls	Rachel	Al Adamson	1975	
Mako: The Jaws of Death	Karen	William Grefe	1976	as Jenifer Bishop; Final film
