= Impulse (1974 film) =

- Theatrical release poster
- Directed by: William Grefé
- Written by: Tony Crechales
- Produced by: Socrates Ballis
- Starring: William Shatner; Ruth Roman; Harold Sakata; Jennifer Bishop; James Dobson; Kim Nicholas
- Cinematography: Julio Chavez
- Edited by: Edwin Gibson
- Release date: January 31, 1974
- Running time: 82 minutes
- Country: United States
- Language: English
- Budget: $250,000
- Box office: $4 million

Impulse is a 1974 American horror thriller film, starring William Shatner as a serial killer of wealthy widows. Ruth Roman, Kim Nicholas, Jennifer Bishop and Harold Sakata co-star. It was written by Tony Crechales and directed by William Grefé.

The film was first released in Tampa, Florida, on January 31, 1974, where the filming took place. It was subsequently released nationwide in 1974–75, making nearly $4 million in the domestic box office.

== Plot ==
As a boy, Matt Stone became a homicidal maniac after killing his mother's abusive boyfriend in self-defense. As a playboy conman in adulthood, he has a history of swindling women out of their money, then killing them and moving on to find his next wealthy victim. Matt thinks he has spotted the perfect target for his next deadly scam, the alluring single mom Ann Moy, but Moy's adolescent daughter Tina sees through the grifter and tries to warn her mother to steer clear.

Complications occur when Matt gets a visit from his old prison cellmate, a wrestler known as "Karate Pete". Pete wants to cut in on Matt's action, but Matt gathers the courage to kill Pete in a car wash. The murder is witnessed by Tina, for which Stone tries to play nice with her by offering a ride to school. Tina tells her mom, who thinks Tina is just making up lies about Matt and accuses her of being selfish in trying to ruin her happiness.

However, Ann's older friend Julia gets to know Matt and soon becomes convinced that young Tina is right about him, with her suspicions putting her on Matt's ever-growing list for elimination. This all leads to a final violent showdown in Julia's palatial home.

== Cast ==
- William Shatner as Matt Stone
- Ruth Roman as Julia Marstow
- Harold Sakata as Karate Pete
- Jennifer Bishop as Ann Moy
- James Dobson as Clarence
- Kim Nicholas as Tina Moy

== Production ==
The working title for the film was Want a Ride, Little Girl? According to the Examiner.com interview, director Grefé cast actors who were located in Miami at the time. He met Shatner at the airport, Bishop was Grefé's friend, and Sakata had a wrestling career there apart from appearing in the James Bond film Goldfinger.

Filming lasted 15 days, including 12 with Shatner and the final three with other actors. During one take of the scene where Shatner's character hangs Sakata's character to death, Sakata nearly died of being accidentally hanged by tight rope. Fortunately, with Sakata's "superior neck development", the crew was able to save his life. Shatner broke his finger during the incident while supporting Sakata's weight, but didn't find out until later due to his concern for Sakata.

Shatner's then-wife, Marcy Lafferty, has a small role as a motel clerk whom Matt Stone seduces.

== Reception ==
Contemporary reviews of Impulse were mixed to negative. The Miami Herald called it a "playful, modest caper" that was "fun... on its admittedly-limited level", while the Tampa Bay Times described it as "interesting but uneven". The Kentucky Courier Journal called it "revolting exploitation", while the Atlanta Journal dismissed it as "sloppy" and "poorly-made", and said Shatner's performance was "the poorest excuse for a deranged killer we've seen in many a day." The Atlanta Constitution complained that publicity for the film had misleadingly implied it was a supernatural thriller.

Retrospectively, critics such as John Wilson have categorized the film as the "rock bottom" of Shatner's career. Leonard Maltin called it "distasteful" and "truly awful". (Note: Early editions of Maltin's Movie Guide called Shatner's character a "child molester" although there is no indication of this within the film itself; later editions amended this description to "lothario".) Shatner himself has distanced himself from Impulse, commenting: "I've forgotten why I was in it. I probably needed the money. It was a very bad time for me. I hope they burn it."

== In popular culture ==
The band Prolapse sampled the line of dialog "I want you to meet someone, Tina – this is Matthew Stone" in their song "Tina This is Matthew Stone" which is the closing track of their debut album Pointless Walks to Dismal Places.

== See also ==
- List of American films of 1974
