= Robert Maxwell (cinematographer) =

American cinematographer

- Born: Robert Ervin Maxwell; December 25, 1923; Los Angeles, California, USA
- Died: December 22, 1978 (aged 54); Redondo Beach, California, USA
- Occupation: Cinematographer

Robert Maxwell (sometimes credited as Bob Maxwell) was an American cinematographer known for his work on B movies, pornography, and exploitation films of the 1960s and 1970s. His best-known credits include Melvin Van Peebles' Sweet Sweetback's Badasssss Song and Don't Play Us Cheap.

== Selected filmography ==
- Candy Stripers (1978)
- Telefantasy (1978)
- The Only Way to Spy (1978)
- The Zebra Force (1976)
- Mafia Girls (1975)
- Paesano: A Voice in the Night (1975)
- The Centerfold Girls (1974)
- Tower of Love (1974)
- Don't Play Us Cheap (1973)
- The Severed Arm (1973)
- The Candy Snatchers (1973)
- House of Terror (1973)
- Did Baby Shoot Her Sugardaddy? (1972)
- Strangers (1972)
- The Blue Hour (1971)
- Point of Terror (1971)
- Sweet Sweetback's Baadasssss Song (1971)
- Wanderlove (1970)
- Up Your Teddy Bear (1970)
- Blood Mania (1970)
- The Bang Bang Gang (1970)
- The Zodiac Couples (1970)
- Love Me Like I Do (1970)
- Song of the Loon (1970)
- The Scavengers (1969)
- The Ramrodder (1969)
- College Girls (1968)
- The Astro-Zombies (1968)
- Girl in Gold Boots (1968)
