= Tower of Love =

Tower of Love may refer to:

- Tower of Love (album), a 2005 album by Jim Noir
- Tower of Love (film), a 1974 XXX comedy film
- "Tower of Love", a 2020 song by Erasure from the album The Neon
