= The Candy Snatchers =

1973 American exploitation crime film by Guerdon Trueblood

- US film poster
- Directed by: Guerdon Trueblood
- Written by: Bryan Gindoff; Uncredited: Guerdon Trueblood
- Produced by: Bryan Gindoff
- Starring: Tiffany Bolling; Ben Piazza; Susan Sennett; Brad David; Vince Martorano
- Cinematography: Robert Maxwell
- Edited by: Richard Greer
- Music by: Robert Drasnin
- Production company: Marmot Productions
- Distributed by: General Film Corporation
- Release date: April 13, 1973
- Running time: 94 minutes
- Country: United States
- Language: English

The Candy Snatchers is a 1973 American exploitation crime film directed by Guerdon Trueblood. The film was unofficially inspired by the kidnapping of Barbara Jane Mackle. It stars Susan Sennett as a teenager who is kidnapped and held for ransom by three amateur criminals. The picture gained cult film status which received a DVD release in 2005 through Subversive Cinema and a Blu-ray release by Vinegar Syndrome in 2020.

== Plot ==
Candy is a 16-year-old girl who gets kidnapped on her way home from her Catholic school. The three kidnappers include Eddy, his partner Jessie and Jessie's brother Alan. After taking her in their van and tying her up, they bury her alive in a Southern California field. They give her a pipe for air, expecting they will soon gain a ransom from her father. Unbeknownst to them, Sean Newton - an autistic young boy living nearby - witnesses their crime. He returns home and tries to tell his intolerant parents - Dudley and Audrey - about what he saw.

The kidnappers contact Candy's father, Avery Phillips, demanding that he pay her ransom with all the diamonds in his jewelry store. However, Avery stays put and doesn't report the abduction to anyone, including Candy's mother Katherine.

The kidnappers dig Candy up and bring her to their hideout. Jessie and Alan intend to remove Candy's ear to present to Avery as leverage, but Eddy prevents this. Jessie and Alan visit the morgue, where they bribe the coroner Charlie to remove an ear from a cadaver. Meanwhile, Eddy and Candy bond, with the former promising the latter that he will not let anyone do harm to her. After Jessie and Alan return to the hideout, Eddy rapes Jessie, who shows signs of mental illness.

Eddy presents the ear to the unmoved Avery, who reveals that Candy is his stepdaughter and that she is set to inherit $2 million from her late father when she turns 21 - if she dies before then, he will receive half her inheritance. Alan heads to the hideout to kill Candy. Sean infiltrates the hideout and discovers Candy, who tells him to contact the police. Alan returns and rapes her. Eddy interrupts the assault and beats Alan. Sean escapes unseen. But when he goes home, he misunderstands Candy's instructions and uses a police doll to call a Jewish deli in Brooklyn.

Jessie and Alan insist that Candy must die. In the night, Eddy takes Candy to the grave, promising to return and save her. The next morning, he tells Alan he killed her. As Sean watches them drive off, he tries to sneak back with a pair of scissors. However, his mother catches him and gives him a downer to keep him quiet.

The kidnappers visit Katherine, who becomes intoxicated and is seduced by Alan. The kidnappers have Katherine call Avery, who is having an affair with his employee Lisa (Phyllis Major). Avery returns home, where he is held at gunpoint by the kidnappers while Alan murders Katherine.

Avery leads the kidnappers to the jewelry store, where he delivers to them the contents of the safe. Alan secretly takes Avery's revolver from his desk. And when Avery fails to retrieve it, Alan shoots and wounds him and Eddy. Eddy then grabs a rifle being brandished by Jessie, causing it go off and kill Alan. Eddy and Jessie then try to escape, but Avery kills Jessie and pursues Eddy to the grave site. They have a gunfight that ends with Avery's death.

Eddy attempts to dig Candy up, but Sean appears and shoots him dead with Avery's gun. Sean then listens to Candy's breathing through the pipe. Audrey calls Sean with a cowbell, prompting him to make a trail to his house by sliding down the hill on his backside. Then a gunshot is heard, followed by the sound of the cowbell dropping and Candy's breathing in her underground prison. Her final fate remains unknown.

== Cast ==
- Tiffany Bolling as Jessie
- Ben Piazza as Avery Philips
- Susan Sennett as Candy Philips
- Brad David as Alan
- Vince Martorano as Eddy
- Bonnie Boland as Audrey Newton
- Jerry Butts as Dudley Newton
- Leon Charles as Boss
- Dolores Dorn as Katherine Philips
- Phyllis Major as Lisa
- Bill Woodard as Charlie
- Christopher Trueblood (as Christophe) as Sean Newton
- Earl Hansen as Gun Store Owner
- Harry Kronman as Deli Owner
- John Bill as Policeman
- James Whitworth as Phone Man
- Howard Shoup as Jewellery Store Salesman
- Rosella Kronman as Boss' Wife
- Alan DeWitt as Priest
- Diana Vaughan Read as Nun

== Reception ==
Actress Tiffany Bolling has stated that she later came to regret making the film and that she had only done it for a paycheck. She further commented that "I was doing cocaine...and I didn't really know what I was doing, and I was very angry about the way that my career had gone in the industry...the opportunities that I had and had not been given.... The hardest thing for me, as I look back on it, was I had done a television series, The New People, and so I had a lot of young people who really respected me and... revered me as something of a hero, and then I came out with this stupid Candy Snatchers movie... It was a horrendous experience."

Critical reception for the film has been positive. It currently holds a rating of 83% on Rotten Tomatoes based on 6 reviews, with a weighted average of 6.38/10. DVD Talk gave a positive review for the 2005 DVD release, citing the disc's extras as a highlight. Bloody Disgusting gave a more mixed review and gave the film three out of five skulls.
