= Bonnie's Kids =

- US film poster
- Directed by: Arthur Marks
- Written by: Arthur Marks
- Produced by: Charles Stroud
- Starring: Tiffany Bolling; Steve Sandor; Robin Mattson; Scott Brady; Alex Rocco; Max Showalter; Lenore Stevens; Leo Gordon; Timothy Brown
- Cinematography: Robert Charles Wilson
- Edited by: Richard Greer
- Music by: Carson Whitsett
- Production company: Tommy-J Productions
- Distributed by: General Film Corporation
- Release date: July 26, 1972
- Running time: 105 minutes
- Country: United States
- Language: English

Bonnie's Kids is a 1972 American neo-noir film written and directed by Arthur Marks.

== Plot ==
Myra and Ellie Thomas, sisters residing in Glendora, California, find themselves entangled with their abusive stepfather, Charley, who was once married to their now-deceased mother, Bonnie. When Charley attempts to rape the younger Myra, Ellie intervenes, shooting him with a shotgun. Instead of reporting the incident to the authorities, the sisters decide to escape to Los Angeles, seeking refuge with their only known relative, a wealthy uncle named Ben Siemen.

Unbeknownst to Ellie, her uncle quickly involves her in a money-laundering operation. However, upon discovering the illicit scheme, Ellie double-crosses her uncle and escapes with the money. She then instructs Myra to rendezvous with her in El Paso, Texas as they plan to flee the country. A series of unfortunate deaths follows as the uncle and his hired hitmen relentlessly pursue the sisters to recover the stolen funds.

== Cast ==
- Tiffany Bolling as Eleanor "Ellie" Thomas
- Robin Mattson as Myra Thomas
- Steve Sandor as Larry
- Scott Brady as Ben Siemen
- Lenore Stevens as Diana Siemen
- Alex Rocco as Eddy
- Leo Gordon as Charley
- Max Showalter as Frank
- Timothy Brown as Digger
- Luanne Roberts as Paula Clark
- Sharon Gless as Sharon
- Garrison True as Mr. Harps
- Hedgemon Lewis as himself

== Music ==
- Sam Neely - "Blue Time"
- Estelle Silberkleit - "Escape"
- Carson Whitsett - "Got to Be a Way"
- Carson Whitsett - "Someday I'll Understand"
