= The Checkered Flag (1963 film) =

- Theatrical release poster
- Directed by: William Grefe
- Written by: William Grefe
- Produced by: Herb Vendig
- Starring: Joe Morrison; Evelyn King; Charles S Martin
- Production company: Guild Studios 5
- Distributed by: Motion Picture Investors
- Release date: 1963
- Running time: 110 minutes
- Country: United States
- Language: English

The Checkered Flag is a 1963 film, directed by William Grefe.

== Plot ==
The alcoholic wife of a rich car racing champion persuades a young driver to kill her husband.

== Cast ==
- Charles G. Martin as Rutherford
- Evelyn King as Bo Rutherford, His Wife
- Joe Morrison as Bill Garrison
- Peggy Vendig as Ginger

== Production ==
It was Grefe's first script. He was originally hired only as writer but took over direction when the original director fell ill.
