= The Italian Flag =

Studio album by Prolapse (band)
- Released: October 1997
- Genre: post punk; indie rock
- Length: 69:07
- Label: Radar Records
- Producer: Donald Ross Skinner

Prolapse (band) chronology
backsaturday (1995)	The Italian Flag (1997)	Ghost of Dead Aeroplanes (1999)

Singles from The Italian Flag
- 1. "Killing The Bland" Released: 1997; 2. "Autocade" Released: 1997; 3. "Deanshanger" Released: 1998

Professional ratings
Review scores
Source	Rating
AllMusic	4/5 stars
NME	8/10

The Italian Flag, is the third album by the band Prolapse, released in October 1997 on Radar Records in the UK. The album was produced by Donald Ross Skinner, who then joined the band, playing on the subsequent tours to support the album's release.

The album was originally released on double 12” vinyl and CD by Radar Records in the UK & Europe, and on CD by Jetset Records in the US.

== Track listing ==
All songs written by Prolapse

Side 1
No.	Title	Length
1.	"Slash/Oblique"	4:55
2.	"Deanshanger"	4:18
3.	"Cacophony No.A"	5:06
4.	"Killing The Bland"	2:27
Total length:		16:46

Side 2
No.	Title	Length
1.	"I Hate The Clicking Man"	5:15
2.	"Autocade"	4:40
3.	"Tunguska"	4:01
4.	"Flat Velocity Curve"	7:16
Total length:		21:12

Side 3
No.	Title	Length
1.	"Return Of Shoes"	5:42
2.	"A Day At Death Seaside"	3:31
3.	"Bruxelles"	5:56
4.	"Visa For Violet And Van"	5:55
Total length:		21.04

Side 4
No.	Title	Length
1.	"Three Wooden Heads"	10:05
Total length:		10:05

== Personnel ==
=== Band ===
- Mick Derrick - vocals, stylophone
- Mick Harrison - bass, guitar
- David Jeffreys - guitar, vocals
- Pat Marsden - guitar, keyboards
- Tim Pattinson - drums
- Linda Steelyard - vocals, keyboard, recorder

=== Production ===
- Produced by Donald Ross Skinner
- Recorded & Mixed by Martin Wilding (except Killing The Bland and Visa For Violet And Van)
- Recorded by Paul Kendall (Killing The Bland and Visa For Violet And Van recording only)
- Artwork by Matthew Cooper, Mick Harrison, Paul Harrison
