= Ghosts of Dead Aeroplanes =

1999 studio album by Prolapse

Studio album by Prolapse (band)
- Released: 10 May 1999
- Recorded: July 1997, May 1998, August 1998
- Studio: Foel Studio, Llanfair Caereinion, Powys (July 1997, August 1998); Seamus Wong Studio, Leicester (May 1998)
- Genre: post punk; indie rock
- Length: 50:01
- Label: Cooking Vinyl Records
- Producer: Donald Ross Skinner

Prolapse (band) chronology
| The Italian Flag (1997) | Ghosts of Dead Aeroplanes (1999) | I Wonder When They're Going to Destroy Your Face (2025) |

Singles from Ghosts of Dead Aeroplanes
- 1. "fob.com" Released: 1999

Professional ratings
Review scores
| Source | Rating |
|---|---|
| AllMusic | 4.5/5 stars |
| NME | 4/5 stars |
| Drowned In Sound | 5/5 stars |

Ghosts of Dead Aeroplanes is the fourth album by the band Prolapse, released in May 1999 on Cooking Vinyl Records in the UK. The album was again produced by Donald Ross Skinner, who was now a fully fledged member of the band.

The album was originally released on 12” vinyl and CD by Cooking Vinyl Records in the UK, and on CD by Jetset Records in the US.

== Track listing ==
All songs written by Prolapse

Side 1
| No. | Title | Length |
|---|---|---|
| 1. | "Essence Of Cessna" | 6:46 |
| 2. | "fob.com" | 4:42 |
| 3. | "Adiabatic" | 5:46 |
| 4. | "Cylinders V12 Beats Cylinders 8" | 7:45 |
| Total length: | | 24:59 |

Side 2
| No. | Title | Length |
|---|---|---|
| 1. | "One Illness" | 5:38 |
| 2. | "After After" | 5:08 |
| 3. | "Government Of Spain" | 5:15 |
| 4. | "Planned Obsolescence" | 9:01 |
| Total length: | | 25:02 |

== Personnel ==
=== Band ===
- Mick Derrick - vocals, stylophone
- Mick Harrison - bass, guitar
- David Jeffreys - guitar, vocals
- Pat Marsden - guitar, keyboards
- Tim Pattinson - drums
- Linda Steelyard - vocals, keyboard, recorder
- Donald Ross Skinner - guitar

=== Production ===
- Produced by Donald Ross Skinner
