= Guerdon Trueblood =

Costa Rican screenwriter, producer, director, and actor (1933–2021)

- Born: November 3, 1933; San Jose, Costa Rica
- Died: March 3, 2021 (aged 87); Washington Island, Wisconsin
- Education: George Washington University
- Occupations: Screenwriter, producer, director and actor
- Relatives: Billy Mitchell (grandfather)

Guerdon Saltonstall Trueblood (November 2, 1933 – March 3, 2021) was a Costa Rican-born American screenwriter, producer, director and actor.

== Early life and education ==
Trueblood was born in San Jose, Costa Rica to Edward Gatewood Trueblood (1905-1994) and Elizabeth (1906-1973), daughter of United States Army general and aviator Billy Mitchell. He had an elder sister, Felicity (1932-2021). Edward Trueblood was a Princeton-educated diplomat assigned to Asuncion, Santiago, and Paris, and would later serve as a UNESCO cultural relations officer in Uruguay and India, and as permanent U.S. representative to UNESCO stationed in Paris; he was also a senior editor of the Encyclopædia Britannica, and an associate professor of Latin American Studies in Phoenix, Arizona. The Trueblood family had been resident in America since 1682, being descendants of John Trueblood, of Shoreditch, London, England.

At age eight, his parents having divorced in 1940, Trueblood went to live with his grandparents in Alexandria, Virginia. After serving in the United States Navy as a sonar technician, he attended George Washington University, majoring in speech and drama, then lived in Provence, France before moving to Hollywood in 1969.

== Career ==
Trueblood co-wrote, with Richard Matheson, Jaws 3-D (1983); and Sole Survivor (1970), directed by Paul Stanley and starring Vince Edwards, Richard Basehart and William Shatner. He directed the cinematography of Hollywood Meat Cleaver Massacre (1976), where he also played the nuthouse doctor starring Christopher Lee.

He created, produced and wrote Bravo Two (1977), directed by Ernest Pintoff. He directed The Candy Snatchers (1973), written by Bryan Gindoff and produced by Marmot Productions.

== Personal life ==
In 1964, Trueblood married Anne-Marie ("Anna") Vaughan Read, who predeceased him; they had two sons- visual effects artist Guerdon jr, and Christopher- and a daughter, Alexandra. Trueblood died on March 3, 2021, in Sister Bay, Wisconsin, at the age of 87.

== Filmography ==
=== Films ===
- The Day the Hot Line Got Hot (1968)
- The Love War (1970)
- Sole Survivor (1970)
- Welcome Home, Soldier Boys (1971) (also producer)
- Family Flight (1972)
- The Candy Snatchers (1973)
- The Savage Bees (1976)
- The Last Hard Men (1976) (also producer)
- Tarantulas: The Deadly Cargo (1977)
- Ants! (1977)
- Bravo Two (1977) (also producer)
- SST: Death Flight (1977)
- Meatcleaver Massacre (1977) as Nuthouse Doctor
- Terror Out of the Sky (1978)
- The Bastard (1978)
- Jaws 3-D (1983)
- Amazons (1984)
- Blood Vows: The Story of a Mafia Wife (1987) (also producer)
- The Chase (1991) (also producer)
- Desperate Rescue: The Cathy Mahone Story (1993)

=== Television series ===
- Adam-12 (1969-1970)
- The Young Rebels (1970)
- The Young Lawyers (1970)
- Most Wanted (1976-1977)
- Barnaby Jones (1977)
- The Devlin Connection (1982)
- Automan (1984)
