= I Wonder When They're Going to Destroy Your Face =

Studio album by Prolapse
- Released: August 29, 2025
- Studio: Foel (Powys); Stayfree (Leicester)
- Genre: Post-punk, indie rock
- Length: 44:37
- Label: Tapete
- Producer: Mike Bew; Prolapse

Prolapse chronology
Ghosts of Dead Aeroplanes (1999)	I Wonder When They're Going to Destroy Your Face (2025)

Singles from I Wonder When They're Going to Destroy Your Face
- 1. "On the Quarter Days" Released: 25 March 2025

I Wonder When They're Going to Destroy Your Face is the fifth studio album by English indie rock band Prolapse. It was released on 29 August 2025 via Tapete Records in LP, CD and digital formats.

== Background ==
The album was preceded by the band's 1999 fourth full-length release, Ghosts of Dead Aeroplanes and features a runtime of approximately forty-four minutes.

Its first single "On the Quarter Days" was released on 25 March 2025.

== Reception ==
Professional ratings
Review scores
Source	Rating
God Is in the TV	9/10
Narc	4.5/5

Martin Gray of Louder Than War described the album as "a neat fusion and composite of all those previous four Prolapse albums", noting that "What is most comforting about this new album is, given the length of absence, Prolapse still sound exactly like Prolapse."

God Is in the TV's Steven Doherty assigned it a rating of nine out of ten, referring to several songs on the album as "groove-laden", "noisy, undisciplined," and "swirling, messy but melodic."

It received a rating of 4.5 from Narc, whose reviewer Lee Fisher commented, "I Wonder... is the Prolapse we know and love and by God, it's good to have them back."

== Track listing ==
All tracks are written by Prolapse.

I Wonder When They're Going to Destroy Your Face track listing
No.	Title	Length
1.	"The Fall of Cashline"	5:44
2.	"Cha Cha Cha 2000"	2:59
3.	"Err on the Side of Dead"	6:35
4.	"Ghost in the Chair"	7:05
5.	"On the Quarter Days"	6:55
6.	"Cacophany No. C"	3:47
7.	"Jackdaw"	2:56
8.	"Ectoplasm United"	5:26
9.	"A Forever"	3:10
Total length:		44:37

Limited edition bonus tracks
No.	Title	Length
10.	"Swearing for Decoration"	3:41
11.	"Ectoplasm United" (A Faust Remix)	3:48
Total length:		52:06

== Personnel ==
Credits adapted from the album's liner notes.

=== Prolapse ===
- Linda Steelyard – vocals, production
- Mick Derrick – vocals, production
- David Jeffreys – guitar, production
- Pat Marsden – guitar, production
- Tim Pattison – drums, production
- Mick Harrison – bass, production
- Donald Ross Skinner – guitar, production, additional recording, editing, pre-mastering

=== Additional contributors ===
- Mike Bew – production, recording, engineering
- Michael Garbsch – mastering
- Sara Langvik Berge – cover design
- Hans Joachim Irmler – remixing on "Ectoplasm Untied (A Faust Remix)"

== Charts ==
Chart performance for I Wonder When They're Going to Destroy Your Face
Chart (2025)	Peak position
Scottish Albums (OCC)	55
UK Albums Sales (OCC)	93
UK Independent Albums (OCC)	30
