= Stanley (1972 film) =

- Theatrical release poster
- Directed by: William Grefé
- Screenplay by: Gary Crutcher
- Story by: William Grefé
- Produced by: William Grefé
- Starring: Chris Robinson
- Cinematography: Cliff Poland
- Edited by: Julio Chavez
- Music by: Post Production Associates
- Production company: Stanley Corporation
- Distributed by: Crown International Pictures
- Release date: 24 May 1972 (Los Angeles)
- Country: United States
- Language: English

Stanley is a 1972 American horror film directed and produced by William Grefé, about a Seminole Indian and a Vietnam veteran who uses his collection of pet snakes to take revenge on his enemies.

== Cast ==
- Chris Robinson as Tim Ockopee
- Alex Rocco as Richard Thomkins
- Steve Alaimo as Crail Denning
- Susan Carroll as Susie Tomkins
- Mark Harris as Bob Wilson

== Production ==
Director William Grefé pitched the film to Crown International's head Red Jacobs after the success of the film Willard (1971), about a young man who can somehow control rats. Grefe stated in March 1972 that he got the idea of the film after having a nightmare about snakes. The film was shot entirely in the Everglades and Ivan Tors Studios in Miami, Florida. The cast includes Chris Robinson, who appeared in other films made in Florida, such as Charcoal Black (1972) and Thunder County (1974).

A report in the Daily Variety stated William Loos would score the film, but only Post Production Associates is credited onscreen for the film score.

== Release ==
Stanley was shown in Los Angeles on May 24, 1972. On its release, Stanley was described by Brian Albright of as "one of [Grefe]'s most successful horror projects."
