= Robert Carricart =

French-American film, television and theatre actor

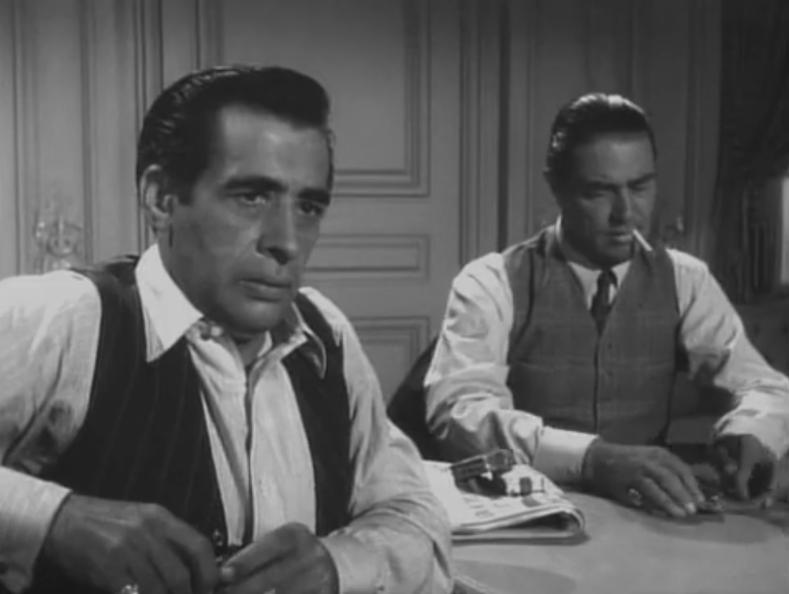
- Carricart (left) with Richard Reeves in The Lawless Years, 1959
- Born: Robert Anthony Carricart; January 18, 1917; Bordeaux, France
- Died: March 3, 1993 (aged 76); Los Angeles, California, U.S.
- Occupation: Actor
- Years active: 1947–1991

Robert Anthony Carricart (January 18, 1917 – March 3, 1993) was a French-American film, television and theatre actor. He was known for playing the role of Pepe Cordoza in the American action drama television series T.H.E. Cat.

== Life and career ==
Carricart was born in Bordeaux. At the age of three, he emigrated to the United States with his mother, but was taken to Spain by an uncle and aunt at the age of 16. He then went back to the United States shortly before the outbreak of the Spanish Civil War. After serving in the Army during World War II he planned to become a playwright. He attended the Dramatic Workshop in New York, where he took a playwriting class on the G.I. Bill.

Carricart began his acting career in 1947, playing Thyreus in a Broadway production of Anthony and Cleopatra. His theatre credits also included appearances in Broadway productions of King Richard III, Captain Brassbound's Conversion, and The Rose Tattoo. He spoke French, Spanish, and Italian, which he found helpful in his move to Hollywood, California. Carricart began his screen career in 1950, appearing in the documentary series Believe it or Not!. He guest-starred in television programs including M Squad, The Man from U.N.C.L.E., Mr. Lucky, Combat!, The Time Tunnel, The Untouchables, Columbo, The Andy Griffith Show, Tales of Wells Fargo, Get Smart, Have Gun, Will Travel, Bat Masterson, Man with a Camera, Branded, Perry Mason and Bonanza. In 1963, Carricart played Jose Garcia in the film Fun in Acapulco, which starred Elvis Presley. He was signed by film producer Hal B. Wallis.

Other films in which Carricart appeared included Blueprint for Robbery, Dime with a Halo, Apache Uprising, Blood on the Arrow, Robin and the 7 Hoods, Follow That Dream, Black Spurs, and Villa Rides. He was originally cast as George Washington Wishbone on the CBS western television series Rawhide, but only appeared in an unaired pilot, with Paul Brinegar taking over the role for the main series. In 1966, he joined the cast of the NBC action drama television series T.H.E. Cat, playing the nightclub owner and gypsy Pepe Cordoza.

== Death ==
Carricart died in March 1993 in Los Angeles, California, at the age of 76.
