= The Blue Hour (1971 film) =

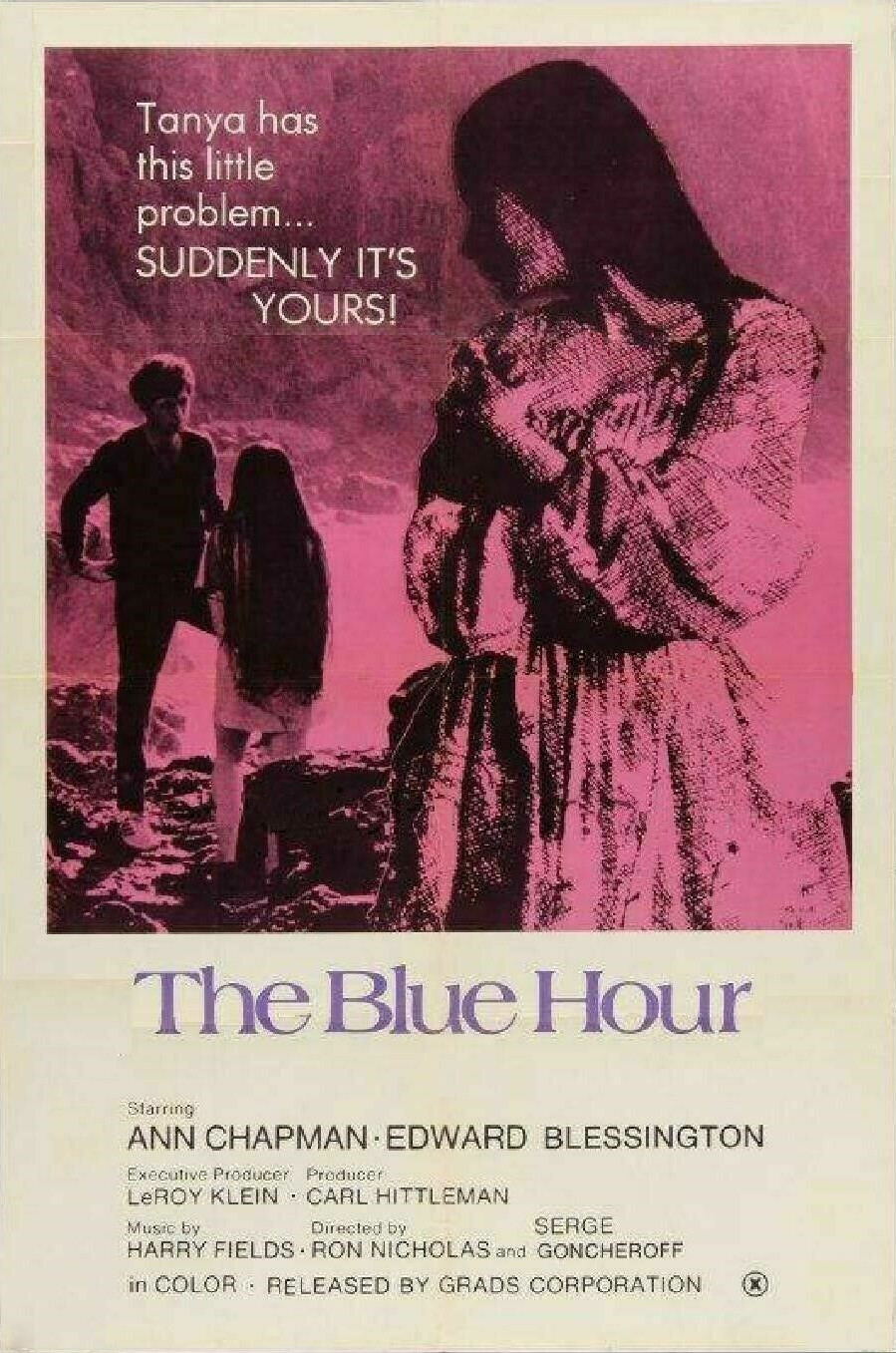
- Theatrical release poster
- Directed by: Sergei Goncharoff; Ron Nicholas
- Written by: Carl Hittleman; Ron Nicholas
- Produced by: Carl Hittleman
- Starring: Ann Chapman; Nicholas Wayne; Mary Beth Hughes
- Cinematography: Robert Maxwell
- Edited by: S.Z. Goncharoff; Susan Trieste Collins
- Distributed by: Grads Corp.
- Release date: 1971
- Running time: 82 min
- Country: United States

The Blue Hour is a 1971 American independent exploitation film directed by Serge Goncharoff.The film, a production of the company Grads Corps. was long thought lost before its rerelease on DVD in 2013. It stars Mary Beth Hughes.

== Plot ==
The non-linear plot follows Tania, who arrives in Los Angeles and becomes a call girl. Dream-like flashbacks show her in turn of the century Greece where a young priest becomes obsessed with her.

== Production ==
The film is Serge (sometimes given as Sergei) Gontcharoff's directorial debut: he would later direct House of Terror. Goncharoff had been working as editor on The Female Bunch.
