= Sole Survivor (1970 film) =

- Screen capture
- Genre: Drama; Fantasy
- Written by: Guerdon Trueblood
- Directed by: Paul Stanley
- Starring: Vince Edwards; Richard Basehart; William Shatner
- Music by: Paul Glass
- Country of origin: United States
- Original language: English

Production
- Executive producer: Steve Shagan
- Producer: Wally Burr
- Cinematography: James Crabe
- Editor: Renn Reynolds
- Running time: 90 minutes
- Production company: Cinema Center 100 Productions

Original release
- Network: CBS
- Release: January 9, 1970

Sole Survivor is a CBS Friday Night Movie directed by Paul Stanley and starring Richard Basehart, William Shatner, and Vince Edwards. The film, written by screenwriter Guerdon Trueblood, was first aired on television in 1970.

While the film follows the fate of the six-man crew of a B-25 Mitchell bomber, Sole Survivor is loosely based on the 1958 discovery of the B-24 Liberator bomber Lady Be Good in the Libyan desert. The Lady Be Good and her nine-man crew had disappeared without a trace in 1943, following its first and only combat mission in World War II. The bodies of eight of the crew were found in 1960.

== Plot ==
While returning from a bombing mission during World War II, a battle damaged United States Army Air Forces B-25 Mitchell is returning from a mission when the navigator Lieutenant Hamner (Richard Basehart), bails out without orders. The five remaining crew are unable to navigate and the plane overflies their base by 300 miles. Believing they are still over water, they bail out and survive their parachute landings, although one of the crew, Brandy (Dennis Cooney), is badly injured. Tony (Lou Antonio), follows the path their aircraft last flew, hoping to obtain water and survival gear from the wreck. Tony finds the wreck further on in the Libyan desert, but is killed when he seeks shelter under the tail and it breaks from the wreckage and crushes him. The remaining crewmen die of exposure after days in the African sun. Their ghosts make their way back to the wreckage and spend the next 17 years in a limbo state, playing baseball and longing for repatriation, which can occur only if their bodies are recovered.

An oil surveying aircraft discovers the wreckage and reports their finding to the United States Air Force. The five crew members realize they will soon "have visitors" and restore the aircraft to its state at the time of the crash, replacing objects and artifacts in their original positions to convince their visitors they had stayed with the aircraft and prompt them to search for their bodies. They are shocked to discover they can't be seen and are actually ghosts.

Hamner, the sole survivor of the crew, has remained in the military and is an Air Force brigadier general. Investigators Lieutenant Colonel Josef Gronke (William Shatner) and Major Michael Devlin (Vince Edwards) invite him to accompany their team to the wreck site. Fearing disciplinary action should the truth of his survival be found out, he tries to convince Gronke and Devlin that the others bailed out over the Mediterranean with him and that the pilotless aircraft somehow flew on by itself. The discovery of a harmonica at the site, belonging to crewman Gant (Lawrence P. Casey), suggests the crew did not bail out over the sea, but the bodies remain nowhere to be found.

The investigation team has no choice but to accept Hamner's explanation, though Devlin is convinced that Hamner is lying. Devlin also feels guilty about a military aircraft he crashed in California, when school children were killed after he ejected. Devlin confronts an inebriated Hamner, who admits his actions, although he points out that pilot Mac (Patrick Wayne) had turned down navigator Hamner's heading to a Nazi occupied landing point, and then believed the others had probably (and "should have") bailed out rather than flying on in the damaged aircraft. The ghosts of the crew surround Hamner in his tent and begin to harass him by appearing, and he flees into the desert in a jeep. The investigators follow him to an abandoned life raft which shows the crew, acting in darkness, was convinced they were bailing out over open water - confirming Hamner's confession to Devlin. Hamner is a broken man, confronted with the evidence of his cowardice.

The team calculates the distance between the wreck and the life raft and estimate how long the crew survived on foot. One by one, they find the missing bodies and each ghostly crewman vanishes as their bodies are recovered. Only the spirit of Tony, who died under the collapsed tail of the aircraft, remains behind, the "Sole Survivor". A diary found near Mac's body mentions Tony's attempt to return to the aircraft to search for water. Devlin is determined to find Tony and wants the investigative team to make one final detailed search at the crash site. The movie ends with one lone ghost trapped at the crash site, and one determined investigator on a quest to find him.

== Cast ==
- Vince Edwards as Maj Michael Devlin
- Richard Basehart as Brig General Russell Hamner
- William Shatner as Lt Col Josef Gronke
- Lou Antonio as Tony
- Lawrence P. Casey as Gant
- Dennis Cooney as Brandy
- Brad David as Elmo
- Patrick Wayne as Mac (credited as Pat Wayne)
- Alan Caillou as Corey
- Timur Bashtu as Beddo
- Noah Keen as MG Schurm
- Ian Abercrombie as British co-pilot
- David Cannon as Capt Patrick
- John Winston as British pilot
- Julie Bennett as Amanda
- Bart Burns as Older Senator
- Vin Scully as himself (voice of a Los Angeles Dodgers baseball game heard on radio)

== Production ==
Sole Survivor was shot primarily on location in the El Mirage Dry Lake in the northwestern Victor Valley of the central Mojave Desert, within San Bernardino County, California. The shooting schedule involved a three-and-a-half-week period in May–June, 1969.

The aircraft that were used in the film were:

- Cessna 310
- North American TB-25JN Mitchell c/n 108-34254, s/n 44-30979
- Sikorsky H-19B c/n 551050, N860

== Historical background ==
In 1943, the actual aircraft—Lady Be Good—failed to find its airbase near the African coast after a bombing raid on Naples. Instead the crew mistakenly flew on hundreds of miles into the desert. This was because the navigation system could not distinguish between a direct or reciprocal bearing contact. The same radio bearing would be returned whether the bomber was inbound or outbound from its base.

Eventually as the B-24's fuel ran out, the nine-man crew bailed out into the Libyan desert. The eight survivors tried to walk to safety; their remains were eventually found in 1960 some 80 to 100 miles north of the wreckage site. The aircraft broke into two pieces upon impact. When it was found in 1958 by an oil surveying team, the bomber's wreckage was well preserved with edible food and water still on board. Its machine guns and radio were also still in working order. (Note: In the 1960s TV series The Twilight Zone, an episode entitled "King Nine Will Not Return" was also based on the discovery of the Lady Be Good.)

== Reception ==
Sole Survivor aired on January 9, 1970, and was the first of made-for-TV movies broadcast on CBS, and produced by CBS-owned Cinema Center Films (the company's short-lived foray into feature film production). Sole Survivor was released in Region B/2 in a DVD/Blu-ray dual-disk set on March 14, 2016.

Film aviation historian Simon D. Beck in The Aircraft-Spotter's Film and Television Companion (2016) described Sole Survivor as "a tense, well-crafted story."
