= Dime with a Halo =

1963 film by Boris Sagal

- Directed by: Boris Sagal
- Written by: Hans Wilhelm; László Vadnay
- Starring: Barbara Luna
- Cinematography: Philip H. Lathrop
- Edited by: Ralph E. Winters
- Music by: Ronald Stein
- Distributed by: Metro-Goldwyn-Mayer
- Release date: May 1963
- Running time: 94 minutes
- Country: United States
- Language: English

Dime with a Halo is a 1963 film directed by Boris Sagal. It stars Barbara Luna and Rafael López.

== Plot ==
Four thieving street urchins, led by Chuy, bet $2 on a pick-six horse race every week. A kindly American, Mr. Jones, places their bet for them while visiting Tijuana each week to indulge himself at strip clubs and with prostitutes. The gang is joined by a new kid in town, Jose, whose sister, Juanita, is stripping at a local club. To get some luck, the kids decide to steal a dime from the church poor box to "make Jesus a partner" in the bet. They win $81,000. Unwilling to trust an adult to cash in their ticket, Juanita contacts Mr. Jones in Los Angeles. Mr. Jones drives to cash in the bet, but has a heart attack on the way. The ticket flutters away in the breeze. Unable to find the betting ticket, the boys return the dime to the poor box.

== Cast ==
- Barbara Luna as Juanita
- Rafael López as Chuy Perez
- Roger Mobley as Jose
- Paul Langton as Mr. Jones
- Robert Carricart as Cashier
- Jennifer Bishop as Stripper

== Production notes ==
Dime with a Halo was the last movie issued by the Hal Roach Studios. Director Boris Sagal used Roach's forlorn, run-down facilities because they looked like a decaying Mexican city.

The film's copyright was renewed.
