= The Centerfold Girls =

- US film poster
- Directed by: John Peyser
- Screenplay by: Bob Peete
- Story by: Arthur Marks
- Produced by: Charles Stroud
- Starring: Andrew Prine; Tiffany Bolling; Aldo Ray; Ray Danton; Francine York; Jaime Lyn Bauer; Mike Mazurki
- Cinematography: Robert Maxwell
- Edited by: Richard Greer
- Music by: Mark Wolin
- Production company: Centerfold Ltd. Productions
- Distributed by: General Film Distributors
- Release date: August 8, 1974
- Running time: 90 minutes
- Country: United States
- Language: English

The Centerfold Girls is a 1974 sexploitation thriller film directed by John Peyser. The film is about a sadistic serial killer (Andrew Prine) who targets the centerfold models of popular men's magazines.

== Cast ==
- Andrew Prine as Clement Dunne

=== The First Story ===
- Jaime Lyn Bauer as Jackie (Miss March)
- Aldo Ray as Ed Walker
- Dennis Olivieri as Tim
- Janet Wood as Linda
- Teda Bracci as Rita
- Tallie Cochrane as Donna
- Paula Shaw as Mrs. Walker
- John Hart as Sheriff
- Jaki Dunn as Nurse
- Charlie as Judy (Miss January)

=== The Second Story ===
- Ray Danton as Perry
- Francine York as Melissa
- Jeremy Slate as The Detective
- Mike Mazurki as The Caretaker
- Jennifer Ashley as Charlie (Miss May)
- Kitty Carl as Sandi
- Ruthy Ross as Glory
- John Denos as Sam
- Janus Blythe as Roommate

=== The Third Story ===
- Tiffany Bolling as Vera Porter (Miss July)
- Connie Strickland as Patsy
- Anneka Di Lorenzo as Pam
- Scott Edmund Lane as Sailor #1
- Richard Mansfield as Sailor #2
- Dan Seymour as Proprietor
- Walden as himself
