= T.H.E. Cat =

American action drama television series

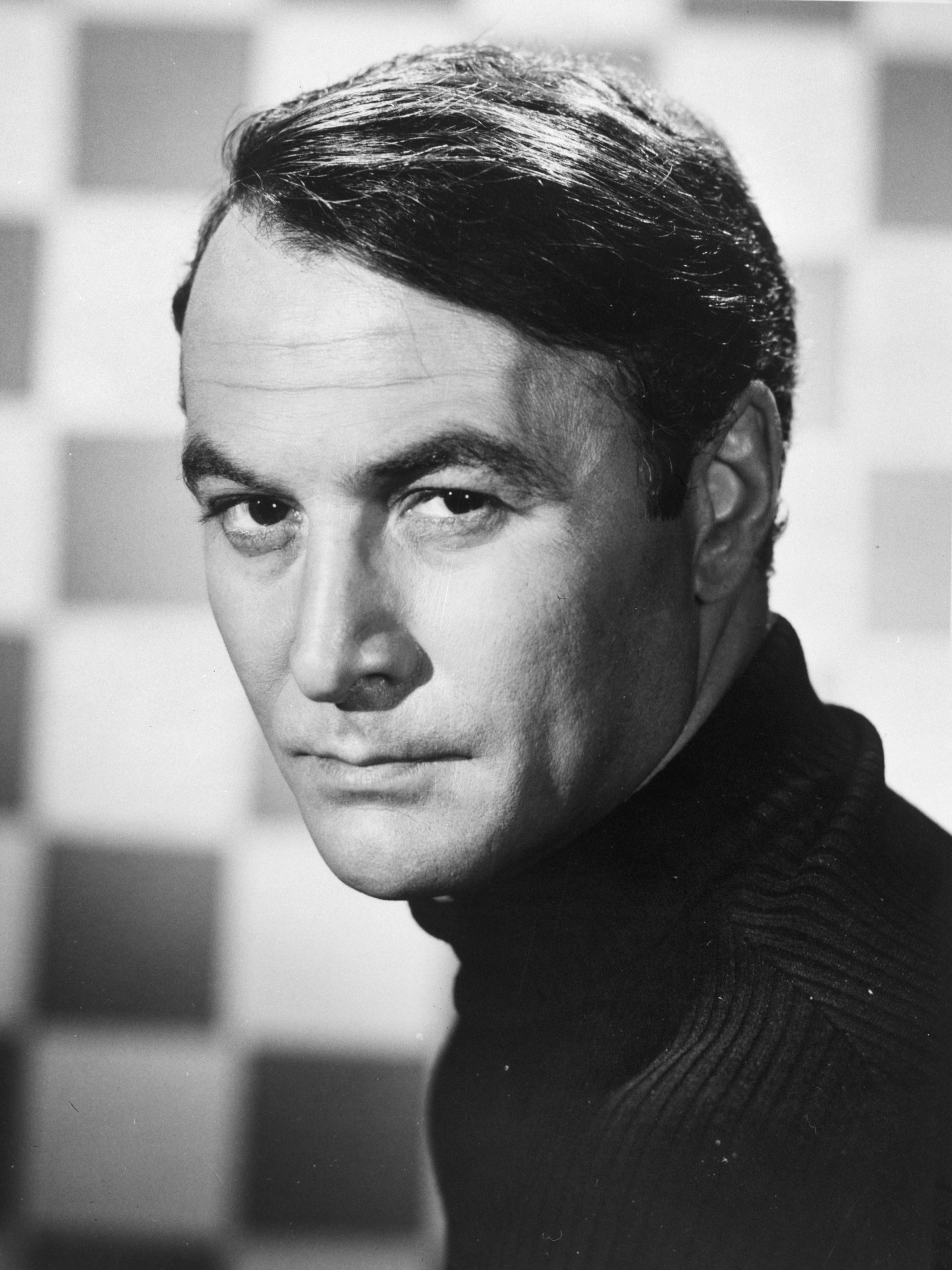
- Robert Loggia in T.H.E. Cat
- Genre: Action drama Crime drama
- Created by: Harry Julian Fink
- Written by: Ronald Austin; James D. Buchanan; Harry Julian Fink; Robert Hamner; Herman Miller; Bernard C. Schoenfeld; Jack Turley
- Directed by: Alan Crosland Jr. Paul Baxley; Don McDougall; Maurice Vaccarino; Boris Sagal; Jacques Tourneur
- Starring: Robert Loggia; R. G. Armstrong; Robert Carricart
- Composers: Lalo Schifrin; Gerald Fried; Ruby Raksin
- Country of origin: United States
- Original language: English
- No. of seasons: 1
- No. of episodes: 26

Production
- Producer: Boris Sagal
- Running time: 30 minutes
- Production company: NBC Productions

Original release
- Network: NBC
- Release: September 16, 1966 – March 31, 1967

T.H.E. Cat is an American television action drama that aired on NBC Fridays from 9:30 p.m. to 10:00 p.m. during the 1966–1967 television season.

Robert Loggia starred as the title character, Thomas Hewitt Edward Cat. The series preceded the 1968–1970 ABC television series It Takes a Thief, which was also about a cat burglar who uses his skills for good. T.H.E. Cat is reminiscent of Peter Gunn in that the action is backed by a memorable music score, composed by Lalo Schifrin, who did the music for The Man from U.N.C.L.E. and Mission: Impossible.

The series was co-sponsored by R. J. Reynolds (Winston) and Lever Brothers and was created by Harry Julian Fink.

== Synopsis ==
Out of the night comes a man who saves lives at the risk of his own. Once a circus performer, an aerialist who refused the net. Once a cat burglar, a master among jewel thieves. Now a professional bodyguard. Primitive... savage... in love with danger. The Cat!

The series' hero is a reformed thief who had served a prison term. Of Romani heritage, Cat is cast in the mold of famed private eye Peter Gunn. Like Gunn's waterfront bar Mother's, Cat operates out of Casa Del Gato (House of the Cat) in San Francisco, of which he is part owner. Thomas is a master of martial arts who uses his skills to stop antagonists in his pursuit of justice for the downtrodden. He always works on the side of the law, occasionally using his skills to benefit the local police. His police contact is Police Capt. McAllister, a man with one hand. R. G. Armstrong played McAllister in 12 episodes of the series. Cat is also a master gymnast and acrobatic artist who uses his skills to gain entry to places from which the police are barred by law.

== Cast ==
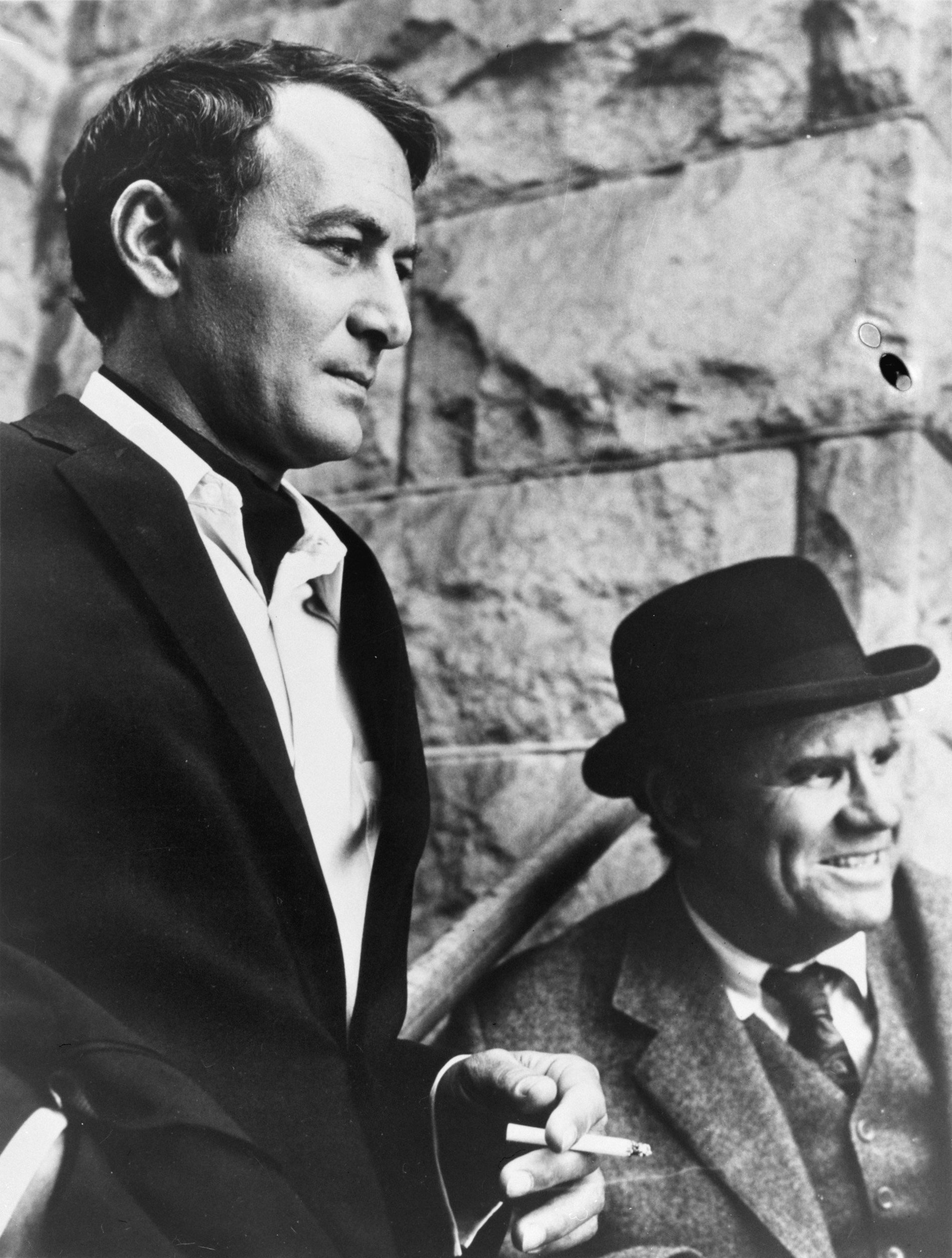
Loggia and Armstrong

- Robert Loggia as Thomas Hewitt Edward Cat
- R. G. Armstrong as Captain McAllister
- Robert Carricart as Pepe Cordoza

Guest stars included: Chris Alcaide, Barbara Stuart, Steve Ihnat, Robert Duvall, Laura Devon, Yvonne Romain, Sorrell Booke, Diana Muldaur, Linda Cristal, Ted Jordan, Robert Sampson, Simon Scott, Fred Beir and Caesar Romero.

== Ratings and mid-season changes ==
The series was test-marketed during the summer of 1966 and did well, so NBC expected it to have high ratings. However viewership was disappointing, and few teenagers watched the program.

After sixteen episodes were completed the series took a two-week filming break so that star Robert Loggia could go on an eight-city publicity tour to explain his character, T. Hewitt Edward Cat, and the writers could make changes they hoped would appeal to more teens. Loggia stated people had told him the series was too "arty" and they didn’t understand the concept. He had also been told that the "mysterious" character was too mysterious, and viewers didn’t know enough about him. When the series resumed production the character of Captain McAllister was eliminated, as many viewers didn’t like seeing Cat being close to a policeman. The changes didn’t help viewership, and the series was cancelled after one season.

== Episodes ==
No.	Title	Directed by	Written by	Original release date
1	"To Kill a Priest"	Boris Sagal	Harry Julian Fink	September 16, 1966
An extortionist vows to kill a priest (Jason Evers) who tells fishermen not to pay protection money.
2	"The Sandman"	Boris Sagal	James D. Buchanan & Ronald Austin	September 23, 1966
Sanderson, a cat burglar who mentored Cat, needs to steal a gem called The Portuguese so he can return it to the owner he once stole it from.
3	"Payment Overdue"	Boris Sagal	Robert Hamner	September 30, 1966
The press agent for a Casa del Gato singer (Laura Devon) is killed, and Cat sets out to find out why.
4	"The Brotherhood"	Maurice Vaccarino	Harry Julian Fink	October 7, 1966
The Brotherhood will kill a girl if Cat doesn't bring them an ex-cop being released from prison.
5	"Little Arnie from Long Ago"	Don McDougall	James D. Buchanan & Ronald Austin	October 14, 1966
McAllister wants revenge on the ex-con, Arnie (James Whitmore), who shot his hand off 30 years ago. Arnie, fresh out of prison, plans to return to a life of crime, but other criminals, such as Drummer (Jack Gilford), realize he's now living in the past.
6	"None to Weep, None to Mourn"	Harvey Hart	Herman Miller	October 21, 1966
A Copic man dies and his son must spend the night by his father's corpse. The widow (Diana Muldaur), believes her son will be killed, and hires Cat to protect him.
7	"Moment of Truth"	John Rich	John O'Dea & Arthur Rowe	October 28, 1966
Pepe asks Cat to protect a crippled ex-matador, but a singer (Linda Cristal) tells Cat to stay away from the man.
8	"Marked for Death"	Alan Crosland Jr.	George F. Slavin & Stanley Adams	November 4, 1966
Gypsies want to execute Pepe, but Cat risks his own life to save him. Albert Salmi and Michael Constantine are guest stars.
9	"Crossing at Destino Bay"	Boris Sagal	Robert E. Thompson	November 18, 1966
Passengers are held hostage at a ferry waiting room. One of them hired Cat for protection. Robert Duvall is a guest star.
10	"To Bell T.H.E. Cat"	Sutton Roley	Bernard C. Schoenfeld	November 25, 1966
A young woman sketching at an outdoor cafe witnesses a murder. Cat must find out if she is an innocent bystander or an accomplice to the true villain (Henry Darrow).
11	"Curtains for Miss Winslow"	Herschel Daugherty	Bernard C. Schoenfeld	December 2, 1966
A reclusive actress living in a closed theater hires Cat to protect her from a murderer.
12	"King of Limpets"	Boris Sagal	Herman Miller	December 9, 1966
Cat is hired to protect a boy from villains, but no one will tell Cat who the youth is. John Dehner is a guest star.
13	"The System"	Don McDougall	Robert Hamner	December 16, 1966
Cat rescues a kidnapped mathematician. Why does a prince want the man back?
14	"The Canary Who Lost His Voice"	Joseph Pevney	Shimon Wincelberg	December 23, 1966
A woman (Pert Kelton) hires Cat to save a man (James Dunn) from a criminal. But is the woman working for the criminal?
15	"The Ring of Anasis"	Jacques Tourneur	Herman Miller	December 30, 1966
Cat is hired to protect a man (William Daniels) who believes he is meant to be sacrificed. Someone tries to kill the suspects.
16	"Queen of Diamonds, Knave of Hearts"	Boris Sagal	Jack Turley	January 6, 1967
Cat's friend needs the return of the necklace she gave to a blackmailer (Cesar Romero).
17	"A Hot Place to Die"	Paul Baxley	Jack Turley	January 13, 1967
A couple on the run have evidence to convict a criminal. They hire Cat for protection.
18	"A Slight Family Trait"	Boris Sagal	Jack Turley	January 20, 1967
A young lady tries to open the safe of a king. Her mother, an old friend of Cat, doesn't want her daughter to follow in the family business of thievery.
19	"If Once You Fail"	Maurice Vaccarino	Harry Julian Fink	January 27, 1967
Cat is courting a doctor who witnesses a murder, and can identify the killer. When Cat fails to save her life, he sets himself up as bait to find her assassin.
20	"Design for Death"	Alan Crosland Jr.	Jack Turley	February 3, 1967
Cat attends a fashion show where a model is murdered. Thieves want the package she planned to give to a friend. Henry Darrow is a guest star.
21	"Matter Over Mind"	Boris Sagal	James D. Buchanan & Ronald Austin	February 10, 1967
A soothsayer (Sally Kellerman) tells a man that Cat is coming after him, and that Cat must be killed.
22	"The Blood-Red Night"	Bert Freed	Bernard C. Schoenfeld	February 17, 1967
An elderly lady (Cathleen Nesbitt) owns a cursed ruby. She hires Cat to protect her until the gem is cut into smaller stones to break the curse. John Hoyt is a guest star.
23	"The Ninety Percent Blues"	Harry Harris	Robert Hamner	February 24, 1967
A night club owner (Warren Stevens) demands that a comic sign away 90% of his wages to stay alive. The comic's girlfriend hired Cat for protection.
24	"The Long Chase"	Paul Baxley	Robert Hamner	March 10, 1967
Police Lieutenant Lassiter (John Marley) asks Cat to rescue a nurse held hostage by a killer (Robert Duvall) who once saved Cat's life.
25	"Twenty-One and Out"	Paul Stanley	Preston Wood	March 24, 1967
Cat's friend (Susan Oliver) is to testify against a criminal. Cat tries to protect her, but she is tired of hiding and insists on traveling. John Marley guest stars as Lieutenant Lassiter.
26	"Lisa"	Jud Taylor	James D. Buchanan & Ronald Austin	March 31, 1967
A man is killed outside of Casa del Gato. He was bringing Cat a message from Lisa (Diana Van der Vlis), an acquaintance who specializes in double-crossing partners in crime. Victor Buono is a guest star.
