= Tiffany Bolling =

American actress, model, and singer

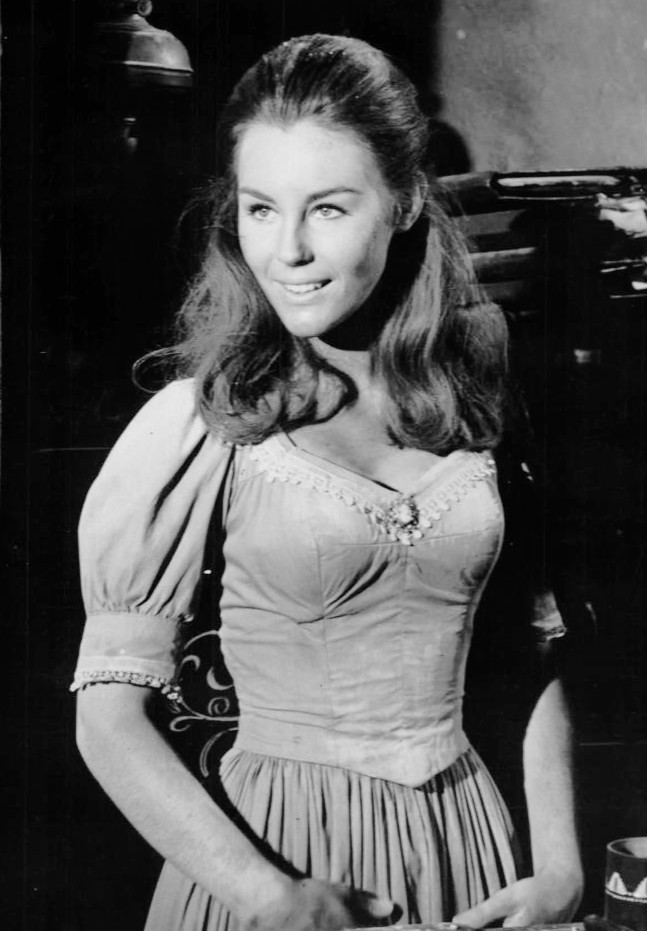
- Bolling in a 1969 Bonanza guest appearance.
- Born: Tiffany Royce Kral; February 6, 1947; Santa Monica, California, U.S.
- Occupations: Actress, model, singer
- Years active: 1967-1998
- Spouse: Richard G. Casares (1983-present) 1 child
- Children: 1
- Father: Roy Kral
- Relatives: Irene Kral (aunt)

Tiffany Bolling (born Tiffany Royce Kral in 1947) is a retired American actress, model and singer, best known for her appearances in cult movies.

== Early years ==
Bolling was born in Santa Monica, California. Her father was singer/pianist Roy Kral. Singer Irene Kral was her aunt. Her parents divorced shortly after her birth. Her mother then married businessman William Bolling, who adopted her. His business ventures brought his new family to southern Florida, where she grew up

== Career ==
In the late 1960s, Bolling had bit parts in the comedy Birds Do It (1966) and the detective drama Tony Rome (1967), starring Frank Sinatra. She starred in the television series The New People, but it only lasted one season (1969–70). She guest-starred on a number of other television series, including Ironside ("The Wrong Time, the Wrong Place", 1970, as a film actress who falls in love with Don Galloway's Sgt. Ed Brown), Marcus Welby, M.D. (as a leprosy victim engaged to Don Galloway's character, shot the same year as the "Ironside" episode), and The Sixth Sense (as Damaris in "Witch, Witch, Burning Bright", 1972).

In April 1972, she did a pictorial for Playboy magazine. She later called that exposure "the worst experience of my life" and said she was not paid a fee. The Playboy photographs led to her appearing in exploitation films, including Bonnie's Kids (1972); The Candy Snatchers (1973); Wicked, Wicked (1973); The Centerfold Girls (1974); and a bit part as Kate in the "Woman in the Wilderness" episode of The Life and Times of Grizzly Adams (1977). She was dismissive of The Candy Snatchers and took the role solely for the money, elaborating "I was doing cocaine...and I didn't really know what I was doing, and I was very angry about the way that my career had gone in the industry... the opportunities that I had and had not been given... The hardest thing for me, as I look back on it, was I had done The New People, and so I had a lot of young people who really respected me and... revered me as something of a hero, and then I came out with this stupid Candy Snatchers movie... it was a horrendous experience."

Bolling continued to win roles throughout the 1970s. She had a supporting role in the Raquel Welch movie The Wild Party (1975) She also appeared in the children's television program Electra Woman and Dyna Girl (1976) and the sci-fi show Man from Atlantis (1977) and co-starred with William Shatner in the science fiction film Kingdom of the Spiders (1977). She had guest roles in The Mod Squad, Bronk, Charlie's Angels, Bonanza, Mannix, Barnaby Jones, and Vega$ as well as Ironside.

== Filmography ==
| Year | Title | Role | Notes |
|---|---|---|---|
| 1966 | Birds Do It | Dancer | Uncredited |
| 1967 | Tony Rome | Photo Girl | Uncredited |
| 1970 | Triangle | Sharon McClure | |
| 1971 | The Marriage of a Young Stockbroker | Girl in the Rain | |
| 1972 | Bonnie's Kids | Ellie | |
| 1973 | Wicked, Wicked | Lisa James | |
| 1973 | The Candy Snatchers | Jessie | |
| 1974 | Centerfold Girls | Vera | (segment "The Third Story") |
| 1975 | The Wild Party | Kate | |
| 1977 | Kingdom of the Spiders | Diane Ashley | |
| 1983 | The Vals | Sam's Mother - Valley Attorney | |
| 1984 | Love Scenes | Val | also known as Ecstasy and Love Secrets |
| 1987 | Open House | Judy Roberts | |
| 1998 | Visions | Lt. Jeffries | |
