= Tower of Love (film) =

- Directed by: George Drazich
- Written by: Harriet Foster
- Starring: Jean Pascal
- Cinematography: Robert Maxwell
- Edited by: Gray Vonn
- Music by: Johnny Legend; Steve Margulies; Louise Arditti
- Distributed by: Boxoffice International Pictures; Something Weird Video
- Release date: 1974
- Running time: 75 minutes
- Country: United States
- Language: English

Tower of Love is a 1974 XXX comedy film directed by George Drazich and written by Harriet Foster. The film was originally distributed by Harry Novak through his VIP label, and was subsequently revived by Something Weird Video.

== Synopsis ==
American models accept a job overseas, attending the Crotavian bicentennial celebration. Their employers insist that they wear chastity belts at all times.

== Cast ==
- Jean Pascal
- Antoinette Maynard (a.k.a. Lilly Foster)
- Carol Hawkins
- Tammy Smith
- Kitty Lombard
- Tommy Walker
- Joseph Peters
- Gene Rowland
- Alan Land
- Mary Valentine
- March Embers
- Bob Boneto
- Floyd Martin
- Bert Davis
- Bob Silvani
- Keith Erickson
- Kristy Fletcher
- George 'Buck' Flower
- Penny King
- Paul Scharf
- Kay White
