= The Hooked Generation =

1968 film directed by William Grefe

- Theatrical release poster
- Directed by: William Grefé
- Written by: William Grefé; Quinn Morrison; Ray Preston
- Produced by: William Grefé; Stuart Merrill
- Starring: Jeremy Slate; Steve Alaimo; John Davis Chandler
- Cinematography: Gregory Sandor
- Edited by: Julio C. Chávez
- Music by: Chris Martell
- Production company: Film Artists International
- Distributed by: Allied Artists Pictures
- Release date: November 13, 1968
- Running time: 92 minutes
- Country: United States
- Language: English

The Hooked Generation is a 1968 American crime drama film directed by William Grefé, starring Jeremy Slate, Steve Alaimo and John Davis Chandler.

== Cast ==
- Jeremy Slate as Daisey
- Steve Alaimo as Mark
- John Davis Chandler as Acid
- Willie Pastrano as Dum Dum
- Socrates Ballis as Cuban Leader
- Cece Stone as Kelly
- Walter R. Philbin as Lieutenant Dern
- Milton Smith as Book Everett
- Lee Warren as Charlie
- William Kerwin as FBI Man #1
- Dete Parsons as FBI Man #2
- Stuart Merrill as FBI Man #3
- Marilyn Nordman as Book's Girlfriend
- Curtis Perdue as Coast Guard Lieutenant
- Michael DeBeausset as Rapper
- Gay Perkins as Nivar
- Terry Smith as Talla
- Clinton Nye as Young Coastguardman
- Emil Deaton as Coastguardman

== Bibliography ==
- Randall Clark. At a Theater or Drive-in Near You: The History, Culture, and Politics of the American Exploitation Film. Routledge, 2013.
