= William Grefé =

American writer and director of films (born 1930)

William Grefé (born May 17, 1930) is an American writer and director of films, best known for his work in the exploitation field. For most of his career he has worked in Florida. He has also worked for a number of years with Hungarian filmmaker Ivan Tors.

In 2016, a documentary was released about his work named They Came from the Swamp: The Films of William Grefe.

In 2020, a four-disc Blu-ray collection He Came from the Swamp: The William Grefé Collection was released by Arrow Video.

== Select credits ==
- 1963 The Checkered Flag
- 1964 I Eat Your Skin - second unit
- 1964 Racing Fever
- 1965 Sting of Death
- 1966 Death Curse of Tartu
- 1966 The Devil's Sisters
- 1967 Wild Rebels
- 1968 The Hooked Generation
- 1970 The Naked Zoo
- 1972 Stanley
- 1972 Alligator Alley
- 1973 The Godmothers
- 1974 Impulse
- 1976 Mako: The Jaws of Death
- 1977 Whiskey Mountain
- 2001 The Psychedelic Priest
- 2013 Marooned
