= The Naked Zoo =

1970 exploitation film

- Theatrical release poster
- Directed by: William Grefé
- Screenplay by: William Grefé
- Story by: Ray Preston
- Starring: Rita Hayworth; Stephen Oliver; Fay Spain; Ford Rainey
- Cinematography: Gregory Sandor
- Edited by: Julio C. Chávez
- Music by: Joe Sherman
- Production company: Film Artists International
- Distributed by: R & S Enterprises
- Release date: September 18, 1970
- Running time: 85 minutes
- Country: United States
- Language: English

The Naked Zoo is a 1970 American exploitation film directed by William Grefé and starring Rita Hayworth, Stephen Oliver, and Fay Spain. Its plot follows a seductive, older Miami housewife who begins an affair with a young author, triggering a violent response from her wealthy, paraplegic husband.

== Cast ==
- Rita Hayworth as Mrs. Golden
- Stephen Oliver as Terry Shaw
- Fay Spain as Pauline
- Ford Rainey as Harry Golden
- Willie Pastrano as Henry
- Fleurette Carter as Nadine
- Steve Alaimo
- Lynne Topping as Jackie Golden (credited as Lynn Topping)
- William Kerwin as Policeman
- Joe E. Ross as Mr. Barnum

== Production ==
Filming took place in Miami and Fort Lauderdale, Florida.

== Reception ==
Rose Thompson of the Radio Times panned the film in an undated 21st century review, deeming it a "sleazy drama" that "wasn't exactly a highlight of Rita Hayworth's career."
