= John Davis Chandler =

American actor (1935–2010)

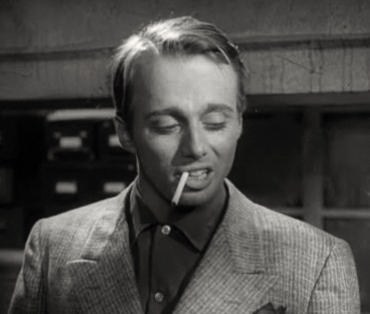
- Chandler in the trailer for Mad Dog Coll (1961)
- Born: January 28, 1935; Hinton, West Virginia, U.S.
- Died: February 16, 2010 (aged 75); Toluca Lake, California, U.S.
- Occupation: Actor
- Years active: 1961–1998
- Spouse: Martha R. Matthews (1970–1990; her death)

John Davis Chandler (January 28, 1935 – February 16, 2010) was an American actor.

== Life ==
Chandler was born in Hinton, West Virginia. He died at age 75 in Toluca Lake, California from cancer.

== Career ==
In 1961, he portrayed the gangster Vincent Coll in Mad Dog Coll, and a kind of mad-dog teen killer in The Young Savages later the same year. He appeared in several of Sam Peckinpah's Western films, and on television between the 1960s and 1990s in The Rifleman; Route 66; Straightaway; The Virginian; Adam-12; Gunsmoke; Walker, Texas Ranger; Quincy, M.E.; Columbo; Murder, She Wrote; and Star Trek: Deep Space Nine. In 1962, Chandler appeared as an escaped convict named Dog on The Virginian in the episode titled "The Brazen Bell".

Chandler had a famous exchange of lines with Clint Eastwood's character in The Outlaw Josey Wales. When asked if he is a bounty hunter, Chandler says, "A man's got to do somethin' for a livin' these days", to which Wales replies, "Dyin' ain't much of a livin', boy."

== Selected filmography ==
- 1961 Mad Dog Coll as Vincent "Mad Dog" Coll
- 1961 The Young Savages as Arthur Reardon
- 1962 Ride the High Country as Jimmy Hammond
- 1965 Those Calloways as Ollie Gibbons
- 1965 Major Dundee as Jimmy Lee Benteen
- 1965 Once a Thief as James Arthur Sargatanas, Walter's Henchman
- 1967 Return of the Gunfighter as "Sundance"
- 1968 The Hooked Generation as "Acid"
- 1969 The Good Guys and the Bad Guys as "Deuce"
- 1970 Barquero as Fair
- 1971 Adam-12 as Wally Barstow (Episode: A Child in Danger)
- 1971 Drag Racer as Dave
- 1971 Shoot Out as Skeeter
- 1971 Adam-12 as Robert "Robin" Saydo (Episode: The Radical)
- 1971 The D.A. as Robert "Robin" Saydo (Episode: The People vs. Saydo)
- 1972 Moon of the Wolf as Tom Gurmandy Jr.
- 1973 Adam-12 as Steve Deal (Episode: Killing Ground)
- 1973 Pat Garrett and Billy the Kid as Norris
- 1974 Columbo as Eddie Kane (Episode: Publish or Perish)
- 1974 The Take as Man With Braces
- 1974 The Ultimate Thrill as Evans
- 1975 Capone as Earl "Hymie" Weiss
- 1975 Walking Tall Part 2 as Ray Henry
- 1976 The Outlaw Josey Wales as First Bounty Hunter
- 1976 Mako: The Jaws of Death as Charlie
- 1976 Scorchy as Nicky
- 1976 Chesty Anderson, USN as Dr. Cheech
- 1976 Doc Hooker's Bunch as Roy
- 1977 Whiskey Mountain as Rudy
- 1977 The Shadow of Chikara as Rafe
- 1979 The Little Dragons as Carl
- 1982 The Sword and the Sorcerer Guard #1
- 1983 Triumphs of a Man Called Horse as Mason
- 1986 Airwolf as Gentry
- 1987 Adventures in Babysitting as Bleak
- 1988 Double Revenge as Charlie "Big Charlie"
- 1990 Crash and Burn as Bud
- 1991 Trancers II as Wino #1
- 1991 Only the Lonely as Duane Earl Tyrone
- 1993 Body of Evidence as Dr. Novaro
- 1994 Phantasm III: Lord of the Dead as Henry
- 1995 Carnosaur 2 as Zeb
