= House of Terror (1973 film) =

- Directed by: Sergei Goncharoff
- Written by: Tony Crechales; E.A. Charles
- Produced by: Sergei Goncharoff; George J. Gade (exec. producer)
- Starring: Jennifer Bishop; Arell Blanton; Mitchell Gregg; Irene Byatt; Ernie Charles; Jacquelyn Hyde; William Kerwin
- Cinematography: Robert Maxwell
- Edited by: Hanya Roman
- Music by: Jaime Mendoza-Nava George J. Gade (ad'l music comp)
- Distributed by: Gamalex Associates Ltd. (USA); International Film Distributors (Canada)
- Release date: 1973
- Running time: 90 minutes
- Country: United States
- Language: English

House of Terror is a suspense film involving deception and a murder plot. It was directed by Sergei Goncharoff, and which starred Jennifer Bishop, Arell Blanton, Jacquelyn Hyde and William Kerwin. It was nominated in 1973 for a Saturn Award for Best Horror Film.

== Plot ==
Directed by Sergei Goncharoff, this film was released around 1972/1973. Jennifer Bishop plays Jennifer Andrews, a nurse who is hired to look after a man's unstable and ill wife. Nurse Andrews has an ex-con former boyfriend who is after the woman's money. After the woman dies, Nurse Andrews marries the dead woman's husband. The ex-con boyfriend has plans to get hold of the money. After the woman's death the nurse and her boyfriend search for the dead woman's money but something isn't quite right, and it may be after them.

== Release ==
The film was released VHS by Trans World Entertainment (TWE). It also appears to have had Beta release around 1987. It was released on DVD by Retro Media in 2012

The film is also known as The Five at the Funeral, and has been screened in U.S. cinemas under that title. Another title is Scream Bloody Murder.

== Cast ==
- Jennifer Bishop
- Arell Blanton
- Mitchell Gregg
- Irene Byatt
- Ernie Charles
- Jacquelyn Hyde
- William Kerwin

== Crew ==
Director Sergei Goncharoff was also the producer of the 1985 film Walking the Edge which starred Robert Forster. The art direction for the film was by Phedon Papamichael, Sr. whose son is Phedon Papamichael.

=== Crew list ===
- Director - Sergei Goncharoff
- Screenplay - Tony Crechales, E.A. Charles
- Music - Jaime Mendoza-Nava
- Cinematographer - Robert Maxwell
- Editor - Hanya Roman
- Art direction - Phedon Papamichael
- Costume designer - Barbara Kerwin
- Makeup - Nora Maxwell
- Production manager - Betsy Paullada
- Second unit director - John 'Bud' Cardos
- Boom man - Chic Borland
- Sound editor - Irwin Cadden
- Sound mixer - Clark Will
- Grip - Ron Batzdorff
- First assistant camera - Ken Gibb
- Gaffer - Skip Karnas
- Best boy - Vossa Leach
- Wardrobe - Frances Dennis
- Composer: additional music - George J. Gade
- Musical director - Jaime Mendoza-Nava
- Production assistant - Tony Crechales
- Script supervisor - Elizabeth Leach
