= Prolapse (band) =

English band

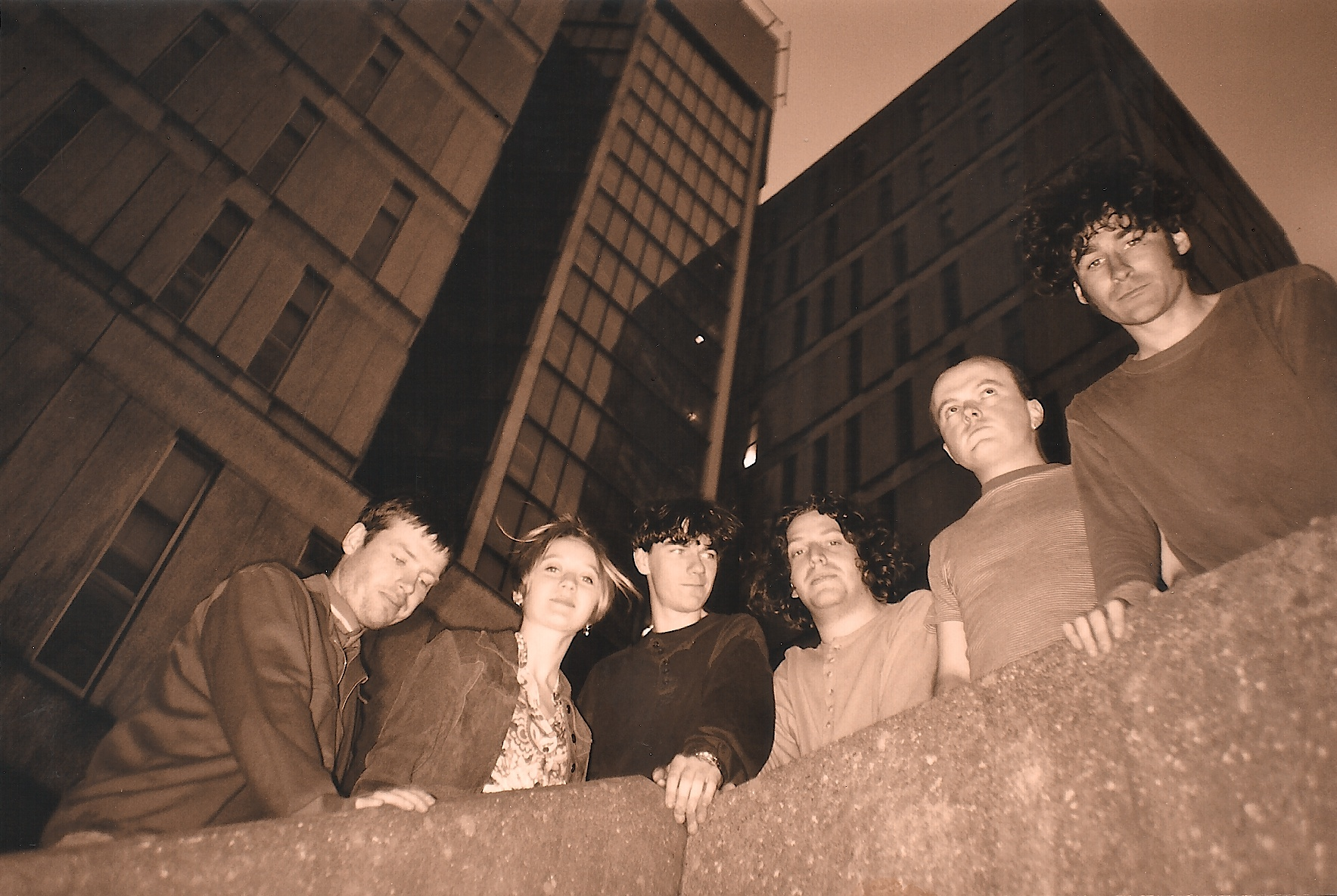
- Prolapse in 1994

Background information
- Origin: Leicester, England
- Genres: Post-punk; indie rock
- Years active: 1992–2000, 2015, 2022, 2024–present
- Labels: Cherry Red; Lissy's; Radar; Cooking Vinyl; Jetset; Tapete
- Members: Mick Derrick; Mick Harrison; Pat Marsden; David Jeffreys; Tim Pattison; Linda Steelyard; Donald Ross Skinner

Prolapse are a British indie rock band formed in Leicester, England, originally active from c. 1992 to 2000, reforming briefly 2015 and 2022 and officially in 2024. The group's sound is a mixture of punk rock, krautrock and shoegazing styles, and characterised by the alternating, contrasting vocal styles of Linda Steelyard and Mick Derrick.

== History ==
=== Formation ===
Prolapse formed in the summer of 1991 at Leicester Polytechnic's Friday night disco, "with the aim of being the most depressing band ever". Of the six members—vocalists Mick Derrick and Linda Steelyard, guitarists David Jeffreys and Pat Marsden, bassist Mick Harrison, and drummer Tim Pattison—only Harrison and Pattison had performed together.

In a 1999 interview, Steelyard stated that the name was chosen "to indicate something undesirable in a miserable sort of way, rather than unsavoury. Unfortunately, we have come to realise that it makes some people think of arses."

=== Cult following ===
In 1993 the band released two EPs on Cherry Red Records, Crate and Pull Thru Barker, followed in 1994 by the single "Doorstop Rhythmic Bloc" and album Pointless Walks to Dismal Places, which won critical acclaim. The band gained attention for their live performances, particularly for songs like "Tina This Is Matthew Stone", which depicted a dialogue between two furious partners. The songs were not as much sung as they were acted over a musical accompaniment. After leaving Cherry Red records, they then went on to release a variety of singles and EPs on a number of different labels.

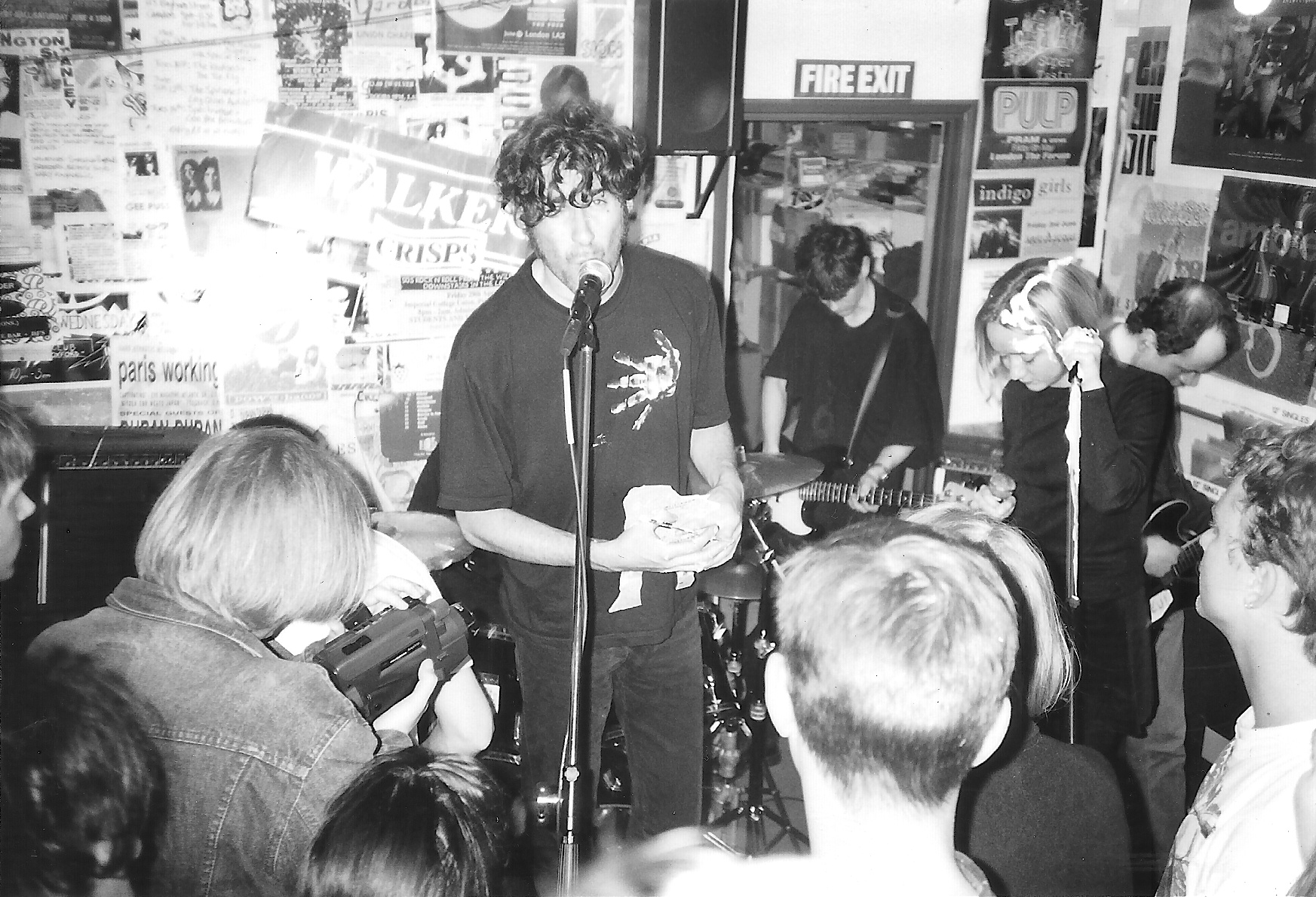
Prolapse performing live at Rough Trade Shop, London, 1994

In 1995, they released their second album, backsaturday, which saw them experimenting with both repetitive grooves and ambient soundscapes. The album was preceded by the single "TCR", which was included on the subsequent U.S. release of backsaturday. A remixed version of the 15-minute lead track "Flex" was also later issued as a limited edition 12-inch titled "Flexed".

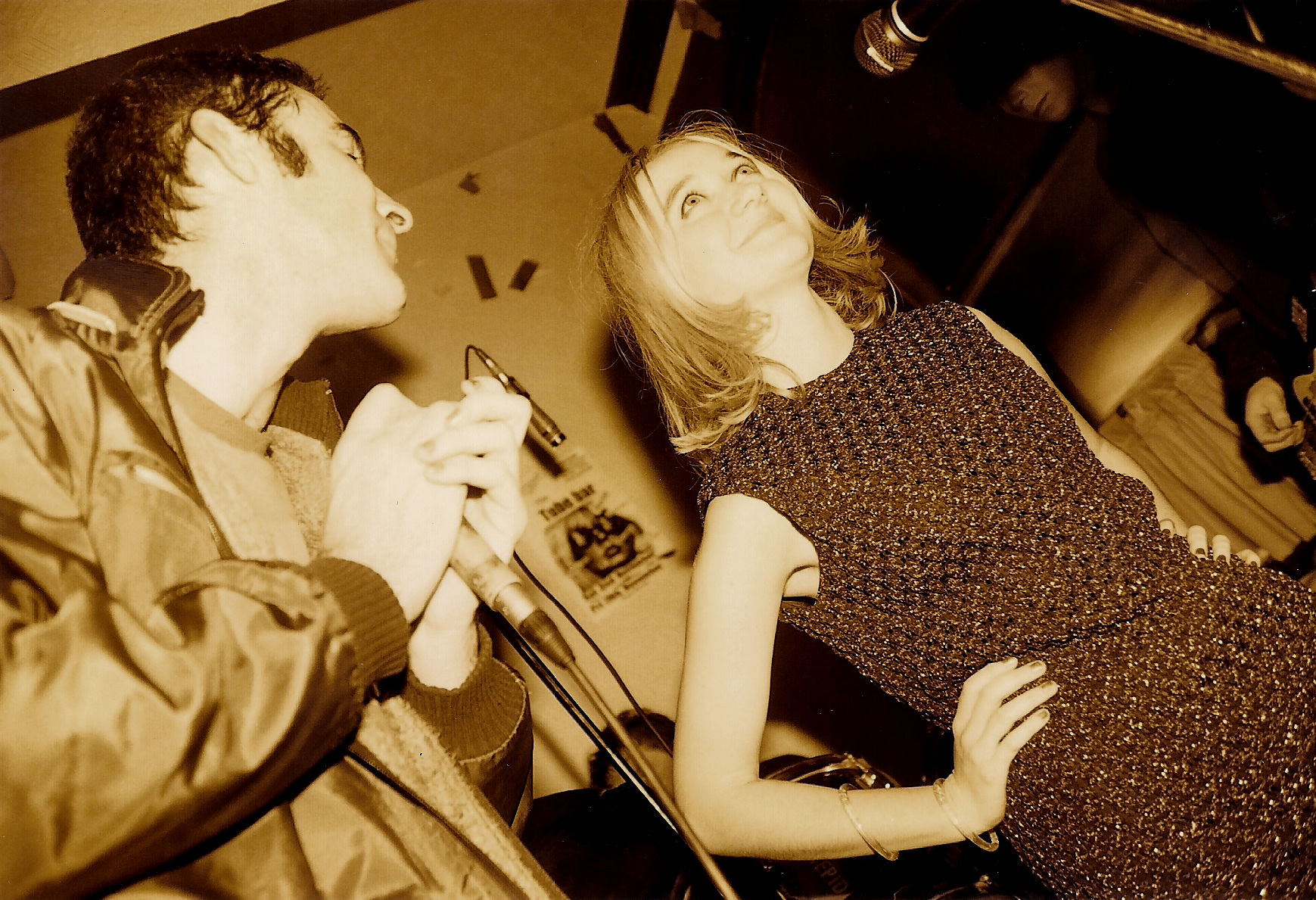
Prolapse performing in Leicester, 1997

Their third album, The Italian Flag (1997), was an eclectic 13-track tour de force which saw Prolapse gain significant radio play for the first time, particularly for the lead single "Killing the Bland" and its follow-up "Autocade", though neither single became a hit. The album returned to the more melodic approach of the first LP, though now with a harder guitar sound, but this time there was also a whole diverse array of styles, earning the band many favourable reviews. The album was produced by Donald Ross Skinner, who was invited to join the band for their subsequent tour on keyboards and guitar.

The final Prolapse LP was Ghosts of Dead Aeroplanes, released in 1999, after which the group drifted apart. As of 2005, Mick Derrick was working as an archaeologist in Norway, Pat Marsden lived in nearby Denmark, drummer Tim played in MJ Hibbett & The Validators, Linda Steelyard was a reporter for the Leicester Mercury and David Jeffreys was a professor of art at Savannah College of Art and Design.

=== Reformation ===
In January 2015, Prolapse reformed to play a series of live dates. The band also performed with Scottish post-rock group Mogwai. These were followed by digital re-releases of much of their back catalogue, including a planned "deluxe edition" of their first album "Pointless Walks to Dismal Places" on Optic Nerve.

In 2019, the band released The Flex E.P., which contained previously unreleased material that had been recorded by the band during their active years. In 2022, Prolapse reformed to complete a short UK tour and posted on their Bandcamp PRE 010: Prolapse – John Peel session 20.08.94 and PRE 011: Prolapse – John Peel session 08.04.97, which contained recordings from the band's work with John Peel.

In 2025, the band returned with their first new material since 1999, with the download single 'On the Quarter Days' with an album due to follow later in the year. The band's fifth studio album, I Wonder When They're Going to Destroy Your Face, was released on 29 August 2025, via Tapete Records. Three songs from the album placed in Dandelion Radio's 2025 Festive Fifty chart, including "On the Quarter Days" at #1.

== Band members ==
- Mick Derrick – vocals (1992–2000, 2015, 2022, 2024–present)
- Mick Harrison – bass (1992–2000, 2015, 2022, 2024–present)
- David Jeffreys – guitar (1992–2000, 2015, 2022, 2024–present)
- Pat Marsden – guitar (1992–2000, 2015, 2022, 2024–present)
- Tim Pattison – drums (1992–2000, 2015, 2022, 2024–present)
- Donald Ross Skinner – guitar (1997–2000, 2015, 2022, 2024–present)
- Linda Steelyard – vocals (1992–2000, 2015, 2022, 2024–present)

== Discography ==
=== Albums ===
- Pointless Walks to Dismal Places (Cherry Red) – 1994
- backsaturday (Lissy's) – 1995
- The Italian Flag (Radar) – 1997
- Ghosts of Dead Aeroplanes – (Cooking Vinyl) – 1999
- I Wonder When They're Going to Destroy Your Face – (Tapete) – 2025

=== Singles and EPs ===
- Crate: Songs for Ella (Cherry Red) – 1993 UK No. 187
- Pull Thru Barker (Cherry Red) – 1994 UK No. 139
- Doorstop Rhythmic Bloc (Cherry Red) – 1994 UK No. 163
- TCR (Love Train) – 1995
- When Space Invaders Were Big/Love Like Anthrax (Cherry Red) – 1995
- Psychotic Now (split-artist Flexi given away free with Warped Reality magazine issue 4)
- Flexed / Unroadkill (Lissy's) – 1996
- Autocade (Radar) – 1997 UK No. 81
- Killing The Bland (Radar) – 1997 UK No. 90
- Snappy Horse (Radar) – 1997
- Deanshanger (Radar) – 1998
- Fob.com (Cooking Vinyl) – 1999 UK No. 99
- The Flex E.P. (Self released) – 2019
- PRE 010: Prolapse – John Peel session 20.08.94 (Self released) – 2022
- PRE 011: Prolapse – John Peel session 08.04.97 (Self released) – 2022
- On The Quarter Days (Tapete) – 2025
