= Pointless Walks to Dismal Places =

1994 studio album by Prolapse

Studio album by Prolapse (band)
- Released: October 1994
- Recorded: 1994
- Studio: Bang Bang Studios, London, England
- Genre: post punk; indie rock
- Length: 50:38
- Label: Cherry Red Records
- Producer: Steve Mack

Prolapse (band) chronology
Pointless Walks to Dismal Places (1994)	backsaturday (1995)

Singles from Pointless Walks to Dismal Places
- 1. "Doorstop Rhythmic Bloc" Released: 1994

Professional ratings
Review scores
Source	Rating
AllMusic	3/5 stars

Pointless Walks to Dismal Places is the debut album by the band Prolapse. It was released in October 1994 on Cherry Red Records. The album was recorded at Bang Bang Studios, London by Steve Mack.

The album was originally released by Cherry Red Records on 12” vinyl and CD. The initial 930 copies of the vinyl LP came in a numbered, hand-painted outer sleeve.

== Track listing ==
All songs written by Prolapse.

Side 1
No.	Title	Length
1.	"Serpico"	5:27
2.	"Headless In A Beat Motel"	4:16
3.	"Surreal Madrid"	5:22
4.	"Doorstop Rhythmic Bloc"	5:19
5.	"Burgundy Spine"	5:31
Total length:		25:55

Side 2
No.	Title	Length
1.	"Black Death Ambulance"	5:39
2.	"Chill Blown"	8:08
3.	"Hungarian Suicide Song"	3:45
4.	"Tina This Is Matthew Stone"	7:11
Total length:		24:43

== Personnel ==
=== Band ===
- David Jeffreys - guitar
- Linda Steelyard - vocals
- Mick Derrick - vocals
- Mick Harrison - bass
- Pat Marsden - guitar
- Tim Pattison - drums

=== Production ===
- Produced and engineered by Steve Mack
- Assisted by Natalie and Jane
- Photos by Rob Jacobs
- Negatives by Claire Morales
