= Whiskey Mountain (film) =

- Theatrical poster
- Directed by: William Grefé
- Screenplay by: Nicholas E. Spanos
- Story by: William Grefé
- Starring: Christopher George; Preston Pierce; Roberta Collins
- Cinematography: Julio C. Chávez
- Edited by: Julio C. Chávez; Ronald Sinclair
- Music by: Charlie Daniels
- Distributed by: Celestial Films, Inc.
- Release date: July 16, 1977
- Running time: 95 minutes
- Country: United States
- Language: English

Whiskey Mountain is a 1977 American exploitation horror film directed by William Grefé and starring Christopher George, Preston Pierce, and Roberta Collins. Its plot follows a group of young people stalked by a gang of unhinged backwoods drug dealers while on a treasure hunt in the wilderness.

== Plot ==
Two couples—Bill and Diana, and Dan and Jamie—travel into the rural mountains of North Carolina on a motorcycling trip. They intend to search the region for a number of antique Civil War rifles, which Diana has a familial connection to, having ancestors from the region. The rifles are believed to be concealed in a cave on Whiskey Mountain. While stopping at a general store nestled in the mountains, the group are harassed by a group of backwoods locals who are marijuana growers.

While camping overnight, the four are unknowingly watched by an unseen figure. In the morning, they are awoken to find brush near their campsite engulfed in flames. After a series of other mishaps, the group become frightened in the woods and decide to abort their trip. While attempting to leave, they find a cabin in the woods and are met by a deranged old man. The four press on, eventually locating the cave they believe contains the antique guns. When Bill and Dan enter the cave, they are met by the men they encountered earlier at the store—Rudy, Jack, Homer, and Bowzer—who have a marijuana growing operation inside the cave.

Fearing their drug operation will be uncovered, the men incapacitate Bill and Dan, leaving them bound inside the cave, and bringing Diana and Jamie to their ramshackle cabin. There, they discuss their plans to murder the travelers and bury them on the mountain. The four men proceed to take turns raping Diana and Jamie while photographing the assaults with a Polaroid camera. Jamie becomes catatonic following the rape.

Meanwhile, the elderly mountain man the group encountered earlier frees Bill and Dan inside the cave. They manage to retrieve their stolen motorcycles and attempt to report the kidnappings to police, but the sheriff disbelieves them. Deciding to take matters into their own hands, Bill and Dan steal guns from a local store and return to the woods to fight the men themselves. Bill and Dan ambush the men at the cabin, saving Diana and Jamie from them only moments before they were preparing to escort the women over the mountain to their deaths. Bill and Dan manage to kill all three attackers, but Dan is fatally wounded in the shootout.

As Bill, Diana, and Jamie emerge from the cabin, a helicopter appears over the bordering lake, descending toward the property. The three appear relieved, presuming that safety has finally found them. They are unaware that in the helicopter is the local sheriff, armed and about to shoot them.

== Cast ==
- Christopher George as Bill
- Preston Pierce as Dan
- Roberta Collins as Diana
- Linda Borgenson as Jamie
- John Davis Chandler as Rudy
- Jerry Rhodes as Jack
- William Kerwin as Homer
- J.G. Patterson Jr. as Bowzer

== Production ==
Filming of Whiskey Mountain took place in North Carolina and Rabun County, Georgia

== Sources ==
- Albright, Brian (2012). Regional Horror Films, 1958-1990: A State-by-State Guide with Interviews. Jefferson, North Carolina: McFarland. ISBN 978-1-476-60042-0.
