= The Psychedelic Priest =

2001 film by William Grefe

- Blu-ray cover
- Directed by: Terry Merrill (as Stewart Merrill); William Grefé (uncredited)
- Screenplay by: Terry Merrill (as Stuart Merrill)
- Story by: Terry Merrill (as Stuart Merrill)
- Produced by: Terry Merrill (as Stuart Merrill)
- Cinematography: William Grefé
- Edited by: Dee Wright
- Production company: Allied International Films
- Distributed by: Something Weird Video
- Release date: 2001
- Running time: 80 minutes
- Country: United States
- Language: English

The Psychedelic Priest (also known as Electric Shades of Grey and Jesus Freak) is a 2001 (Note: The film was made in 1971, but only officially released in 2001.) American film produced by Allied International Films. It was directed by William Grefé, although he was uncredited, and written by Terry Merrill. It stars John Darrell, Carolyn Hall, James Coleman, and Joe Crane.

== Plot ==
John, a Christian priest, says goodbye to his profession and takes a destinationless drive. He gets acquainted with a female hitchhiker, Sunny, who soon falls in love with him. However, John does not feel the same towards her and leaves, returning to work at the church.

== Production ==
The Psychedelic Priest was directed by William Grefé for Allied International Pictures, although for professional reasons he was not acknowledged as director, but instead as director of photography. For his part, Grefé received a hundred thousand dollars in trading stamps. Writer Terry Merrill received the directorial credit instead. Filming began in 1971 in California, during which there was no official timetable or script. Shooting locations included Topanga. The cast and the crew were largely non-professional, and real-life hippies starred in the film.

== Release ==
The film's release was kept on hold after production, as it was felt that it would be a box-office failure. After three decades, in 2001, The Psychedelic Priest was finally released as a direct-to-video project. Distribution was handled by Something Weird Video.

=== Reception ===
DVD Verdict critic Bill Gibron described the film as an "accurate snapshot of America's collective hangover" although stating that it "has got to be the single biggest 'downer' since rave culture rediscovered the horse tranquilizer".

== See also ==
- List of films related to the hippie subculture
