= Harold Sakata =

American Olympian, wrestler, and actor (1920–1982)

Personal information
- Born: Toshiyuki Sakata; July 1, 1920 Hōlualoa, Territory of Hawaii, U.S.
- Died: July 29, 1982 (aged 62) Honolulu, Hawaii, U.S.

Professional wrestling career
- Ring name(s): Tosh Togo; Tosh Tojo; Harold Sakata; Mr. Sakata; Toska Sakata
- Billed height: 5 ft 10 in (178 cm)
- Billed weight: 220 lb (100 kg)
- Billed from: Honolulu, Hawaii; Tokyo, Japan; Yokohama, Japan; Osaka, Japan
- Trained by: Tsutao Higami; Ben Sherman
- Debut: c. 1949
- Retired: c. 1975
- Sports career
Medal record
Men's weightlifting
Olympic Games
Representing the United States
Silver medal – second place	1948 London	Light-heavyweight

Toshiyuki Sakata (坂田 敏行, Sakata Toshiyuki; July 1, 1920 – July 29, 1982), known as Harold Sakata, was an American Olympic weightlifter, professional wrestler, and film actor. He won a silver medal at the 1948 Summer Olympics in London in weightlifting, and later became a popular professional wrestler under the ring name Tosh Togo, wrestling primarily for various National Wrestling Alliance territories as a tag team with Great Togo.

Sakata also wrestled in Japan for the Japanese Wrestling Association between 1955 and 1957, and was an early mentor and sometimes-tag-partner to Rikidōzan. On the basis of his wrestling work, he was cast in the James Bond film Goldfinger (1964) as the villain Oddjob, a role he would be closely associated with for the rest of his life.

== Early life ==
Toshiyuki Sakata was born on July 1, 1920, in Holualoa, Hawaii, to Japanese-American parents who worked at a Kona coffee farm. His father Risaburo was issei (first-generation), and his mother Matsue was nisei (second generation). He had ten siblings, six brothers and four sisters. He adopted the more Western name "Harold" as a teenager.

In 1936, Sakata dropped out of school to help work the family's coffee farm. The following year, he started paid employment at a sugar plantation located about 75 miles away from his home, after which he went to the island of Lanai to work on a pineapple plantation. He then moved to Maui to do more agricultural work, and in 1938 he ended up in Honolulu, where he lived for much of his adult life.

During World War II, he served in the U.S. Army with the 1399th Engineer Construction Battalion, and was briefly deployed to Hawaii.

== Weightlifting career ==
At the age of eighteen, Sakata weighed only 113 lb (8 st 1 lb) (51 kg) at a height of 5 ft 8 in (1.73 m). Wishing to "look as good as the other guys", he started lifting weights. Because all YMCA facilities were racially segregated at the time, he trained primarily at the all-Asian Nu'uanu YMCA. Among his lifting partners was future Amateur Athletic Union (AAU) champion Emerick Ishikawa.

After about a year of serious training Sakata had gained about twenty pounds. Inspired by this success he started entering local lifting contests and in 1941 he won the Territorial light-heavyweight championship. The Japanese attack on Pearl Harbor stopped travel to the mainland but over the next two years Sakata won several more Oahu championships; in June 1943, at 165 pounds, he was pressing 250, snatching 240, and clean and jerking 310, for a total of 800 pounds.

Following his military discharge, Sakata remained in Honolulu, and became de facto leader of a group of local lifters including Richard Tomita.

During a tournament held at the Nuuanu YMCA in November 1946, Sakata set a Hawaiian record in both the snatch and the clean-and-jerk, plus an unofficial world record in the press. The same year he also won the Mr. Hawaii physique title. Henry Koizumi, athletic director of the tournament, suggested that Sakata and his partner Richard Tom organize a weightlifting team. The goal was to place well in the USA Weightlifting National Championships, which were held in Dallas, Texas, in June 1947. Sakata placed first in the 181-pound class with a total lift of 800 pounds. Tom meanwhile placed first in the 123-pound division with a total lift of 610 pounds.

Sakata subsequently qualified for United States' 1948 London Summer Olympic team, lifting a total of 380 kg in the light-heavyweight division and winning a silver medal behind Stanley Stanczyk, against whom he later competed in the US Senior National Championships.

== Professional wrestling career ==
=== Early years ===
In 1949, Sakata retired from weightlifting and began training in professional wrestling. His instructors were Tetsuro Higami and Ben Sherman. He initially wrestled as "the Human Tank, Mr. Sakata", drawing on his World War II service and Olympic accolades to play a face, though he later adopted his more well-known heel gimmick of Tosh Togo.

Under the Togo gimmick, Sakata wrestled across Hawaii and later toured mainland America and Canada, mostly on the West Coast and in the Pacific Northwest, which had a large Japanese immigrant population he proved popular with. He briefly formed a tag-team with Frank Stojack during a tour of Washington state, and also tagged with Tor Yamato during a Midwestern tour.

=== Japan ===
In July 1951, NWA Hawaii promoter Al Karasick invited Sakata to join a special overseas tour to Japan, sponsored by a Tokyo Shriners chapter as a charity venture for a children's hospital. Sakata and several other wrestlers flew to Tokyo, where they held a series of shows at the Metropolitan Memorial Hall and Ryōgoku Kokugikan. One such show was historically significant for being the professional wrestling debut of Rikidōzan, a Korean-born sumotori who became one of the most popular and influential figures in Japanese professional wrestling history, nicknamed "the Father of Puroresu".

According to the official website of the city of Minato, Rikidōzan was introduced to professional wrestling while visiting a gym in Shiba where Sakata and his colleague Bobby Bruns were training for an upcoming match. Bruns became Rikidōzan's first ever opponent. He joined Sakata and Bruns in their tour of Japan, wrestling a series of matches across the country in which Rikidōzan soundly beat his foreign opponents, among them retired heavyweight boxer Joe Louis, helping to establish his popular reputation.

The tour lasted until January 1952, at which point most of the wrestlers returned to America. Sakata remained for another few months, during which time he met and married his wife. He was granted permanent residency in Japan and lived there with his family for some time, but eventually moved back to America due to the constant back-and-forth travel.

=== Tag-team success ===
Sakata returned to America in 1952, and had his first televised match on May 26 on a card that included former judoka Masahiko Kimura and Kinji Shibuya. It was during this period that Sakata adopted the ring name Tosh Togo – Tosh was a shortened form of his given name "Toshiyuki" and Togo was derived from early 20th-century Japanese admiral Tōgō Heihachirō.

Sakata was billed as the kayfabe brother of Great Togo, as well as Masutatsu Oyama as "Mas Togo" and judoka Kokichi Endo as "Ko Togo". As a tag team, Sakata and Great Togo held the NWA Canadian Open Tag Team Championship. Sakata also tagged with Rikidōzan (with whom he unsuccessfully challenged for the inaugural All Asia Tag Team Championship against King Kong Czaja and Tiger Joginder Singh) and King Curtis Iaukea (with whom he won the NWA Hawaii Tag Team Championship). He also held the NWA Texas Heavyweight Championship, the WWC Puerto Rico Heavyweight Championship, and the NWA World Tag Team Championship (with Red Berry).

== Acting career ==
Bond producers Harry Saltzman and Albert R. Broccoli took notice of Sakata because of his heavy build—he stood 5 ft 10 in (1.78 m) in height and weighed 284 pounds (129 kg)—which, when coupled with his intimidating gaze, made him the perfect choice for the part of Oddjob. Another story, told by director Guy Hamilton, stated that he'd first seen Sakata wrestling in Australia.

Sakata had never acted before, besides pro wrestling, but the film character was to be mute (other than a few uttered grunts) and would require little theatrical skill. Before Sakata had secured the role of Oddjob, another former wrestler, British actor Milton Reid, had auditioned for the role. Reid allegedly challenged Sakata to a shoot wrestling contest and suggested that the winner ought to get the role. However, given that Reid had been in Dr. No (playing one of the titular villain's guards) and that his character had been killed off, the producers decided to go with Sakata and the wrestling match did not take place.

As Oddjob, he was a bodyguard to Bond villain Auric Goldfinger, and his sharpened, steel-brimmed bowler hat became a famous and much-parodied trademark of the Bond series. While filming Oddjob's death scene, in which the character is electrocuted, Sakata's hand was badly burnt by the effect, but he held on until he heard director Guy Hamilton call "Cut".

Sakata appeared in several other movies in similar roles and took on "Oddjob" as an informal middle name (in the films Mako: The Jaws of Death (1976) and The Happy Hooker Goes to Washington (1977), he was credited as Harold "Oddjob" Sakata).

With time, Sakata's acting skills developed. He co-starred opposite William Shatner in the movie Impulse (1974), in which he played the character Karate Pete. He also guest starred on a Gilligan's Island episode as Rory Calhoun's henchman, and an episode of The Rockford Files. In 1971, Sakata was a regular on the short-lived TV series, Sarge, starring George Kennedy and made a guest appearance on Laugh In, Season 5, Episode 7. In 1979 he was a regular on Highcliffe Manor. In 1977 he appeared in Quincy M.E. season 3 episode 10 " Touch of Death", portraying a Kung Fu Sensei master. He also played a gangster in the 1966 film, "The Poppy is also a Flower".

Sakata appeared as Oddjob in a series of TV commercials for Vicks Formula 44 cough syrup in the 1970s. The advertisement commonly showed Oddjob with a nasty cough, which results in him demolishing everything around him as his spasms make him inadvertently lash out, frightening his wife as his condition deteriorates. She grabs a bottle of Vicks Formula 44 and gives Oddjob a spoonful of the cough syrup, which cures his cough; the two bow to each other, and then the wife looks past Oddjob to take in the destruction he has caused. This was occasionally followed by an add-on for a cough drop version of the syrup, which Oddjob ingests before he is claimed by a coughing fit in an extremely crowded space. At least one domestic and one outdoor version of this commercial are known. Sakata made an appearance on The Tonight Show Starring Johnny Carson on which he parodied the commercial by destroying Carson's set.

== Personal life ==
Sakata had two children, born in 1954 and 1957. He only married once, and divorced his wife due to the strain placed on their relationship by his constant travel.

=== Death ===
Sakata died of liver cancer four weeks after his 62nd birthday, on July 29, 1982, at St. Francis Medical Center in Honolulu, Hawaii. Five months beforehand, Sakata had made one final public appearance at the 54th Academy Awards. Sakata briefly appeared on stage in his Oddjob attire during Sheena Easton's musical performance of "For Your Eyes Only".

== Championships and accomplishments ==
- 50th State Big Time Wrestling
  - NWA Hawaii Heavyweight Championship (1 time)
  - NWA Hawaii Tag Team Championship (1 time) – with King Curtis Iaukea
- Maple Leaf Wrestling
  - NWA Canadian Open Tag Team Championship (1 time) – with Great Togo
- Mid-Atlantic Championship Wrestling
  - NWA Southern Tag Team Championship (Mid-Atlantic version) (1 time) – with Ike Eakins
- NWA Big Time Wrestling
  - NWA Texas Heavyweight Championship (1 time)
- NWA Hollywood Wrestling
  - NWA International Television Tag Team Championship (2 times) – with Wild Red Berry (1) and Great Togo (1)
  - NWA World Tag Team Championship (Los Angeles version) (1 time) – with "Wild" Red Berry
- NWA Mid-America
  - NWA Southern Tag Team Championship (Mid-America version) (1 time) – with John Smith
- Pacific Northwest Wrestling
  - NWA Pacific Northwest Tag Team Championship (2 times) – with Toi Yamamoto
- World Wrestling Council
  - WWC Puerto Rico Heavyweight Championship (1 time)

== Filmography ==
=== Feature films ===
- Goldfinger (1964) – Oddjob
- Balearic Caper (1966) – Museum Director
- The Poppy Is Also a Flower (1966) – Martin
- Le dix-septième ciel (1966) – (uncredited)
- Dimension 5 (1966) – Big Buddha
- The Phynx (1970) – Sakata
- Impulse (1974) – Karate Pete
- The Wrestler (1974) – Oddjob
- Mako: The Jaws Of Death (1976) – Pete
- Bao po (1976) – Big Man
- The Happy Hooker Goes to Washington (1977) – Wong
- Record City (1978) – Gucci
- Death Dimension (1978) – The Pig
- Goin' Coconuts (1978) – Ito
- Bruce contre-attaque (1982) – Sakata
- Invaders of the Lost Gold (1982) – Tobachi (final film role)

=== Television ===
- Kraft Suspense Theatre (1965) Episode: "Jungle of Fear" - Ching
- The Rockford Files season 4 (1978) Episode: "The Competitive Edge" - John Doe
- The Billion Dollar Threat (1979, TV Movie) - Oriental Man

== In popular culture ==
Japanese professional wrestler Keiji Muto plays Sakata in the 2004 film Rikidōzan.
