= Mako: The Jaws of Death =

1976 film by William Grefe

- Promotional movie poster
- Directed by: William Grefe
- Screenplay by: Robert W. Morgan
- Story by: William Grefe
- Produced by: Bob Bagley; William Grefé; Doro V. Hreljanovic; Paul A. Joseph; Robert Plumb
- Starring: Richard Jaeckel; Jennifer Bishop; Harold Sakata; John Chandler
- Cinematography: Julio C. Chavez
- Edited by: Julio C. Chavez; Ronald Sinclair
- Music by: William Loose
- Production companies: Mako Associates; Universal Majestic Inc.
- Distributed by: Cannon Films
- Release date: July 1976
- Running time: 91 minutes
- Country: United States
- Language: English

Mako: The Jaws of Death is a 1976 thriller film directed by William Grefe. The film is about a brooding loner who accidentally learns that he has a telepathic and emotional connection with sharks. He eventually rebukes society and sets out to protect sharks from people. The film was set and shot on location in Key West, Florida.

== Background ==
This film is one of the first in the wave of films that sought to capitalize on the popularity of the feature film, Jaws (1975). Mako: The Jaws of Death, with its sympathetic portrayal of sharks as the real "victims" of human exploitation, is notable in the maritime horror genre for having depicted the sharks as the heroes and man as the villain.

== Plot ==
Sonny Stein (Richard Jaeckel), learns while working as a marine salvager in the Philippine Islands, that he has a connection with mako sharks. He is given a medallion by a Filipino shaman that protects him from sharks when he is among them. Having become alienated from society, Stein lives alone in a small stilt house offshore of Key West, Florida. He develops an ability to telepathically communicate with sharks. He then sets out to destroy anybody who harms sharks. People enter into his strange world to exploit his abilities and his closeness with his shark "friends". They include an unethical shark research scientist and a morbidly obese strip club owner (Buffy Dee) who wants to use a shark in his dancers' acts. Stein uses the sharks to get revenge on anybody he considers a threat. He later loses the medallion and is then himself killed by the sharks.

== Cast ==
- Richard Jaeckel as Sonny Stein
- Jennifer Bishop as Karen
- Harold Sakata as Pete
- John Chandler as Charlie
- Buffy Dee as Barney
