= The New People =

American TV series

- Genre: Drama
- Created by: Larry Gordon; Aaron Spelling
- Developed by: Rod Serling
- Directed by: Corey Allen; Charles S. Dubin; Harry Harvey Jr. George McCowan; Nicholas Webster
- Starring: Tiffany Bolling; Zooey Hall; Jill Jaress; David Moses; Dennis Olivieri; Peter Ratray
- Theme music composer: Earle Hagen
- Country of origin: United States
- Original language: English
- No. of seasons: 1
- No. of episodes: 17

Production
- Executive producers: Aaron Spelling; Danny Thomas
- Producer: Harold Gast
- Running time: 45 minutes
- Production company: Thomas/Spelling Productions

Original release
- Network: ABC
- Release: September 22, 1969 – January 12, 1970

The New People is a 1969–70 American television series on ABC that focused on a group of young college students who were returning to the United States from a trip in Southeast Asia when their plane crashed on a deserted island in the remote South Pacific Ocean. This program is an extremely rare example of a regularly scheduled network television series with 45-minute-long episodes (which ABC proposed to counteract the competition in the 8:00–9:00 p.m. slot, which included Rowan & Martin's Laugh-In); it aired at 8:15 p.m. (ET), immediately after The Music Scene, another 45-minute program. It is also distinctive because its unusual premise made it perhaps the only American television series of its era that engages with the social, political, and cultural issues raised by the youth rebellion of the late 1960s through the genre of speculative fiction. Less than four months after its premiere, ABC canceled the show, but it remains a largely forgotten precedent for the later and more successful television series Lost.

== Plot ==
A group of college students are flying back to the United States after a goodwill tour to Southeast Asia arranged by the State Department goes awry when they become outspoken about being used as tools of the government and the tour is called off. However, during a severe storm, the plane crashes on a deserted island, leaving only a select number of students alive; the sole surviving adult dies from his wounds not long after the crash. The survivors, with no radio, are the only humans on the island. They learn that the island is Bomano, which has been built up as a site for a potential above-ground nuclear test that never took place, leaving all of the buildings and supplies untouched and ready for use. The New People reflects the youth-oriented counterculture of the 1960s. All people over 30 are now dead, and it is up to the young people to start a new society on the island, which will see bouts of sexism and racism in the fight to establish order. The pilot episode is written by Rod Serling, credited as "John Phillips."

== Cast ==
=== Main cast ===
- Tiffany Bolling as Susan Bradley: daughter of a United States senator
- Zooey Hall as Robert (Bob) E. Lee: white Southerner with racist views
- David Moses as Eugene "Bones" Washington: Black militant
- Peter Ratray as George Potter: former Marine
- Jill Jaress as Ginny Loomis
- Dennis Olivieri as Stanley Gabriel

=== Recurring cast ===
- Clive Clerk as Jack
- Elizabeth Berger as Laura
- Dennis Redfield as Rube

=== Notable guest cast ===
- Richard Dreyfuss as Dr. Owen Rudd
- A Martinez as Gradis
- Billy Dee Williams as Heath
- Tyne Daly as Kathy

== Production ==
Aaron Spelling and Larry Gordon created The New People for Thomas-Spelling Productions, a production company that Spelling and Danny Thomas formed in 1966. It was the company's follow up to The Mod Squad, a popular ABC crime drama about three unconventional police officers that had premiered in 1968. Like The Mod Squad, The New People was designed to attract the youth market. At a time when many youths were rebelling against mainstream society, it asked: Can young people create a new utopian society by themselves if they are freed from the constraints of the older generation? Spelling and Gordon originated the concept and then hired Rod Serling, whom Spelling admired, to develop it into a series.

In November 1968, Serling began writing the script for a 60-minute pilot, which is reminiscent of typical episodes of The Twilight Zone in plot and tone. In January 1969, Thomas-Spelling announced that it was producing the pilot. ABC, which had a reputation for innovative programming, bought it. Spelling claimed that he and Gordon did not ask Serling to make any changes to the first draft of the script because they thought it was perfect. However, Serling's biographer Nicholas Parisi notes that Serling's copy includes numerous comments from both Spelling and the network. After the pilot was filmed, ABC cut it to 45 minutes. This decision frustrated Serling, who replaced his name in the credits with the alias "John Phillips." Parisi observes: "On the title page of his personal copy of the script, Serling wrote, 'This provided a great deal of money but ABC cut 20 minutes out of it & it bled to death.'" His involvement with the show ended with the pilot, but he would work with Spelling on two other projects in the early 1970s. When asked about his involvement in the show, Serling stated it was Spelling's show: "He brought me the idea and I wrote the pilot script. Beyond that, I have nothing to do with it. The show is somewhere between Gilligan’s Island and San Francisco State. It may work. But not with me." Other notable writers who wrote for the show include Stephen Kandel, who penned two episodes, and Edward J. Lakso, who wrote one.

On March 3, 1969, ABC announced that it had scheduled the show for the upcoming fall season. It would air on Monday evenings from 8:15 to 9 p.m., immediately after The Music Scene, which would air from 7:30 to 8:15 p.m. One industry observer described the proposed series as "one of the most intriguing TV projects of the season." Another characterized the pilot as one of the season's best, but acknowledged that the show would face stiff competition. This competition included Laugh-In on NBC and Gunsmoke and Here's Lucy on CBS, which were very popular. ABC's programmers assumed that viewers who had tuned in to The Music Scene would continue to watch The New People because they had missed the first 15 minutes of Laugh-In, which began at 8 p.m. Both shows were "major investments" for ABC; according to a media report, ABC planned to allocate $23–25 million to its all-new Monday primetime schedule. Commercials airing during The New People were initially priced at $43,000 per commercial minute.

The show focused on six characters who represented a cross-section of young people critical of the older generation who were forced to work together to build a new society that reflected their respective and often clashing values. According to TV Guide, they included "all sorts of conflicting types, of course—senator's naïve daughter, black militant, vicious racist, well-meaning premed student, knuckleheaded football hero, grass-smoking hippie, Ivy League conservative, etc. They attempt to resolve their conflicts in numerous ways, most of them luridly melodramatic." Cast member Peter Ratray commented: "This will not be another Gilligan's Island. … The students will try to set up the rudiments of a society on their island. They will confront the problems that are facing the young people today, such as civil rights, drug use, and war. And they will try to get answers for these problems before they become a threat to life on the island."

Production officially began in June 1969. The majority of the actors were unknowns. Most of the beach exteriors were filmed in Malibu. Producer Harold Gast and story editor Earl Booth were looking forward to developing the six protagonists into more well-rounded characters. However, Booth later remarked: "It was during the last half of production that distinct displeasure came to the forefront. The network was unhappy with the way the show was developing, and it led to bitter battles. ABC wanted to make it, purely and simply, an adventure show." Kandel commented: "There was friction [with the network] from the beginning. The original premise was that the students would experiment with social ideas. Communism. Fascism. … Pacifism. Hedonism. … The pilot, by Rod Serling, was striking. For the weekly series, the network wanted a cross between Gilligan's Island and Beverly Hills, 90210. The New People was postulated upon ideas, and that's always risky. With the best and the worst of intentions, it foundered quickly."

== Episodes ==
No.	Title	Original release date
1	"Pilot"	September 22, 1969
A plane with 40 American college students crash lands on an island in the South Pacific. Developed to be a nuclear test site, the island offers a completely provisioned village. The survivors, from a variety of social, political, and economic backgrounds, must now put their conflicting values to the test as they attempt to create a new society. Richard Kiley guest stars as State Department official, Hannicheck. Directed by George McCowan. Written by Rod Serling. See TV Guide, 17, no. 38 (September 20, 1969).
2	"Panic in the Sand"	September 29, 1969
A mysterious epidemic breaks out on the island. Biochemist Owen Rudd (Richard Dreyfuss) needs volunteers to test a substance that may cure the disease—or cause death. Directed by William Wiard. Written by Harold Gast. See TV Guide 17, no. 39 (September 27, 1969).
3	"The Tin God"	October 6, 1969
Bob (Zooey Hall) injures Wendy (Donna Bacala) with the dune buggy he restored. A committee of the New People orders him to take care of her, a decree that he resists. Directed by George McCowan. Written by Charles McDaniel. See TV Guide 17, no. 40 (October 4, 1969).
4	"Murderer!"	October 13, 1969
A man is found dead at the bottom of a cliff. Dan Stoner (Carl Reindel) is suspected of murder, and the New People must decide how to deal with the possible crime. Directed by Nicholas Webster. Written by Stephen Kandel. See TV Guide 17, no. 41 (October 11, 1969).
5	"Comes the Revolution, We Use the Girls' Shower"	October 20, 1969
Stanley (Dennis Olivieri) campaigns against building an aqueduct for the womens' showers, a project he believes threatens the island's power structure, but his plans go awry when he falls in love with a Black woman. Directed by Corey Allen. Written by George Kirgo. See TV Guide 17, no. 42 (October 18, 1969).
6	"Lifeline"	October 27, 1969
Several of the New People decide to build a raft to escape the island, a plan that others view as suicidal. The plan is further endangered when Christine Miller (Brenda Scott) tries to persuade George (Peter Ratray) to build a more durable vessel. Written by Nicholas Webster. Written by John W. Bloch. See TV Guide 17, no. 43 (October 25, 1969).
7	"Marriage – Bomano Style"	November 3, 1969
Cara (Kate Heflin), a teenager raised as a Catholic, is traumatized when she becomes pregnant out of wedlock. Directed by Charles S. Dubin. Written by E. Arthur Kean. See TV Guide 17, no. 44 (November 1, 1969).
8	"Is This Any Way to Run an Island?"	November 10, 1969
George (Peter Ratray) and Ginny (Jill Jaress) decide to build a life of leisure on the beach, but conflicts emerge among the New People when everyone "does their own thing" in a society without rules. Directed by Charles S. Dubin. Written by E. Arthur Kean. See TV Guide 17, no. 45 (November 8, 1969).
9	"The Dark Side of the Island"	November 17, 1969
On an expedition to the other side of the island, the New People discover a shallow grave with a skeleton. The discovery inspires fear that others may be living on the island too, which intensifies when one of the women vanishes. Directed by Nicholas Webster. Written by Gwen Bagni and Paul Dubov. See TV Guide 17, no. 46 (November 15, 1969).
10	"A Bride In Basic Black: The Courtship"(part one)	November 24, 1969
The first part of a two-part story: Ben Geary (Jim McMullan) demands that Susan (Tiffany Bolling) live with him, and another woman accuses Bob (Zooey Hall) of rape. In response, Susan demands that the New People enact a law protecting the women. Directed by Charles S. Dubin. Written by Harold Gast. See TV Guide 17, no. 47 (November 22, 1969).
11	"A Bride in Basic Black: The Surrender"(part two)	December 1, 1969
The second part of a two-part story: After failing to convince the New People to enact a law protecting the women, Susan (Tiffany Bolling) fears that Ben Geary (Jim McMullan) will compel her to live with him. Meanwhile, she must convince Ben to save George (Peter Ratray), who has become ill. Directed by Charles S. Dubin. Written by Harold Gast. See TV Guide 17, no. 48 (November 29, 1969).
12	"The Pied Piper of Pot"	December 8, 1969
Wash (David Moses) takes issue with a self-proclaimed mystic named Steppenwolf (Richard Evans), who begins to cultivate marijuana with the aim of guiding the New People to a state of bliss though marijuana and meditation. Directed by Charles S. Dubin. Written by Edwin Blum. See TV Guide 17, no. 49 (December 6, 1969).
13	"Speed Kills"	December 15, 1969
Warren (Robert Drivas) unexpectedly attacks George (Peter Ratray) in outbursts of paranoid rage. The New People struggle to cope with the eruption of mental illness. Directed by Harry Harvey Jr. Written by Lou Shaw. See TV Guide 17, no. 50 (December 13, 1969).
14	"The Guns of Bomano"	December 22, 1969
When the New People elect a peace officer, the only person on the island permitted to have a gun, they struggle with the issues of law and order, the role of the police, and gun control. Directed by George McCowan. Written by Edward J. Lakso. See TV Guide 17, no. 51 (December 20, 1969).
15	"The Prisoner of Bomano"	December 29, 1969
Black students decide to form their own society on the island. After Wash (David Moses) expresses his support for his white friends, they don't trust him to keep the faith and imprison him. Billy Dee Williams guest stars as Heath. Directed by Corey Allen. Written by E. Arthur Kean and Anthony Terpiloff. See TV Guide 17, no. 52 (December 27, 1969).
16	"The Siege of Fern's Castle"	January 5, 1970
Fern (Susan Howard) is a self-sufficient New Englander who resides in the wrecked plane. After a mine washes ashore near the plane, she refuses to leave her home and asks George (Peter Ratray) to help disable the mine. This episode examines the limits of individual rights. Directed by Harry Harvey Jr. See TV Guide 18, no. 1 (January 3, 1970).
17	"On the Horizon"	January 12, 1970
The New People spot a fishing trawler in the distant ocean, but Paul (Benjamin Archibek) takes measures to ensure that they are not rescued. Tyne Daly guest stars as Kathy. Directed by Corey Allen. Written by Stephen Kandel. See TV Guide 18, no. 2 (January 10, 1970).

== Reception ==
The New People premiered on ABC on Monday, September 22, 1969. The premiere received a rating of 10.7 and a share of 15, compared to 11.9/17 for Here's Lucy and 30.9/43 for Laugh-In. The second episode's ratings did not improve: 11.9/17, compared to 16.4/23 for Here's Lucy and 35.8/50 for Laugh-In. In early November, ABC cancelled the series. It would be the last show produced by Thomas-Spelling, which dissolved in 1969. Spelling attributed its cancellation to its scheduling and its 45-minute length, which he claimed made it impossible to syndicate or sell to foreign television stations. Yet, in his autobiography he spoke about it fondly and described it as "one of my favorite flops."

Reviews of the show were mixed, as reflected in excerpts of 13 reviews published in the September 28, 1969, issue of the industry magazine Broadcasting. For example, the New York Times commented that the premiere "began with many cliché contrivances but has an interesting potential," the Boston Globe predicted that it should be "popular, particularly among the young," and the San Francisco Chronicle noted that it was the "most fascinating program idea of the new season, but … characters will need to display more humor and honor." By contrast, the New York Daily News characterized it as "preachy," the Los Angeles Herald-Examiner described it as "loaded with slogans and abstractions masquerading as flesh-and-blood," and the Washington Post described it as "somewhere between Gilligan's Island and Lord of the Flies."

== Themes and analysis ==
Although it was a ratings disappointment and received mixed reviews, The New People was one of the most innovative and imaginative series of its time. It exemplified the trend among certain American television dramas in the late 1960s to address the social, political, and cultural changes wrought by the youth rebellion. In particular, it epitomized the drive for "relevance" in television programming—a trend that would accelerate in the early 1970s. Yet, by adopting a highly unusual premise and embracing the genre of speculative fiction, it distinguished itself from more conventional crime, law, medical, or family dramas. A 1969 press release stated: "We are enormously excited over the challenge to create meaningful, quality programming that will make young people feel, 'This is our show.'" The critic Cecil Smith noted in the Los Angeles Times: "The young appeal of New People is that it offers dissident youth the opportunity to run the kind of society they visualize—one based on the ethical, moral, nonmaterialistic standards they preach." Like science fiction series of the era, such as Star Trek and Land of the Giants, The New People addressed contemporary issues that many young people deemed relevant, including racial conflict, medical ethics, mental illness, women's rights, police violence, gun rights, and individual liberties, by imagining what might be possible in an alternate reality.

In his autobiography, Spelling wrote: "It was so unique, the idea of landing in a place that was scheduled to be blown up and starting a new life together. Like The Mod Squad and Beverly Hills 90210, the kids had to bond together because there were no adults. But it wasn't like Lord of the Flies, it dealt more with the kids' personal problems—loneliness and things like that. More importantly, they had to invent new rules and new mores. We've often talked about bringing the show back and trying again with a new contemporary version. I'd love to see that happen."

== Broadcast and home media ==
After the final episode of The New People aired on Monday, January 12, 1970, it was never seen on American television again. The series has not been released on home media or streaming platforms, but the pilot may be found on YouTube. The Paley Archive of the Paley Center for Media also holds a copy, while the UCLA Film & Television Archive holds archival copies of each episode of the series. The 51-minute unaired pilot was screened at UCLA Film & Television Archive with a full Serling credit in 2012.

== Original paperback novel and comic book tie-in ==
They Came from the Sea, an original tie-in novel based on the TV series was published in 1969 by Tempo Books, the young adult paperback imprint of Grosset & Dunlap. The author was the prolific tie-in specialist William Johnston, writing under the pseudonym "Alex Steele." In the novel, a radioactive sea creature invades the island. In addition, in 1970, Dell published two issues of a comic book titled The New People that was tied to the series; copies turn up occasionally on eBay. Spelling considered producing a theatrical version of the show but never did.

== Similar programs ==
The concept of having all the adults killed off leaving only the young people to survive was not a new one, nor was this to be its last appearance. This concept had also been used in William Golding's 1954 novel and subsequent film, Lord of the Flies, and in the 27 October 1966 Star Trek episode "Miri".

In 2004, ABC premiered the hit series Lost which also featured a group of plane crash survivors stranded on a strange island. Producer Damon Lindelof later joked that if he had heard of the series, he would have used the name New People for the band of character Charlie Pace. In October 2005, NBC began broadcasting a Saturday morning series with a similar premise, Flight 29 Down.

== For further reading ==
- Robert Jay. "The New People." Television Obscurities, originally published June 11, 2003, and updated March 2, 2025.
- Parisi, Nicholas. "The New People and the Same Old Song and Dance." Rod Serling: His Life, Work, and Imagination, chap. 22. Jackson: University Press of Mississippi, 2018.
- Phillips, Mark, and Frank Garcia. "The New People." In Science Fiction Television Series: Episode Guides, Histories, and Casts and Credits for 62 Prime Time Shows, 1959 Through 1989, 219–225. McFarland, 1996.
- Spelling, Aaron, with Jefferson Graham. "The Mod Squad." In Aaron Spelling: A Prime-Time Life, chap. 7. New York: St. Martin's Press, 1996.
