= 43rd Saturn Awards =

Film, television, and theater award ceremony

- Date: June 28, 2017
- Site: Burbank, California, U.S.
- Hosted by: Sean Gunn

Highlights
- Most awards: 10 Cloverfield Lane; Rogue One: A Star Wars Story (3)
- Most nominations: Rogue One: A Star Wars Story (11)

The 43rd Saturn Awards, presented by the Academy of Science Fiction, Fantasy and Horror Films and honoring the best in science fiction, fantasy, horror, and other genres belonging to genre fiction in film, television, home media releases, and theatre in 2016 and early 2017, were held on June 28, 2017, in Burbank, California. A new category, Best Animated Series or Film on Television, was introduced. The show was hosted by Sean Gunn.

Nominations were announced on March 2, 2017. A Star Wars film led the nominations for the second year in a row, with Rogue One: A Star Wars Story earning eleven; it was followed by The BFG and Doctor Strange with ten, and Captain America: Civil War with eight. On television, The Walking Dead led the nominations for the third year in a row with seven, followed by newcomer Westworld with six. Doctor Strange director and co-writer Scott Derrickson, composer Michael Giacchino, and costume designer Colleen Atwood all earned two individual nominations.

In film, 10 Cloverfield Lane and Rogue One: A Star Wars Story earned the most wins with three, including Best Thriller Film and Best Science Fiction Film respectively; The BFG, Doctor Strange, and La La Land all scored two wins. On television, The Walking Dead won the most awards for the fourth year in a row with three wins including Best Horror Television Series, followed by Stranger Things, Supergirl, and Westworld, all with two. Candice Patton's Best Supporting Actress on Television win for The Flash also ended The Walking Dead's record winning streak in that category.

== Winners and nominees ==
=== Film ===
Best Science Fiction Film	Best Fantasy Film
Rogue One: A Star Wars Story; Arrival; Independence Day: Resurgence; Midnight Special; Passengers; Star Trek Beyond	The Jungle Book; The BFG; Fantastic Beasts and Where to Find Them; Ghostbusters; Miss Peregrine's Home for Peculiar Children; A Monster Calls; Pete's Dragon
Best Horror Film	Best Thriller Film
Don't Breathe; The Autopsy of Jane Doe; The Conjuring 2; Demon; Ouija: Origin of Evil; Train to Busan; The Witch	10 Cloverfield Lane; The Accountant; The Girl on the Train; Hell or High Water; Jason Bourne; The Shallows; Split
Best Action or Adventure Film	Best International Film
Hidden Figures; Allied; Gold; Hacksaw Ridge; The Legend of Tarzan; The Magnificent Seven; The Nice Guys	The Handmaiden; Elle; In Order of Disappearance; The Mermaid; Shin Godzilla; Under the Shadow
Best Comic-to-Film Motion Picture	Best Animated Film
Doctor Strange; Batman v Superman: Dawn of Justice; Captain America: Civil War; Deadpool; Suicide Squad; X-Men: Apocalypse	Finding Dory; Kingsglaive: Final Fantasy XV; Moana; Sing; Trolls; Zootopia
Best Director	Best Writing
Gareth Edwards – Rogue One: A Star Wars Story; Scott Derrickson – Doctor Strange; Jon Favreau – The Jungle Book; Anthony Russo and Joe Russo – Captain America: Civil War; Bryan Singer – X-Men: Apocalypse; Steven Spielberg – The BFG; Denis Villeneuve – Arrival	Arrival – Eric Heisserer; The BFG – Melissa Mathison (posthumously); Deadpool – Rhett Reese and Paul Wernick; Doctor Strange – Jon Spaihts, Scott Derrickson, and C. Robert Cargill; Hell or High Water – Taylor Sheridan; Rogue One: A Star Wars Story – Chris Weitz and Tony Gilroy
Best Actor	Best Actress
Ryan Reynolds – Deadpool as Wade Wilson / Deadpool; Benedict Cumberbatch – Doctor Strange as Dr. Stephen Strange; Chris Evans – Captain America: Civil War as Steve Rogers / Captain America; Matthew McConaughey – Gold as Kenny Wells; Chris Pine – Star Trek Beyond as Captain James T. Kirk; Chris Pratt – Passengers as Jim Preston; Mark Rylance – The BFG as The BFG	Mary Elizabeth Winstead – 10 Cloverfield Lane as Michelle; Amy Adams – Arrival as Louise Banks; Emily Blunt – The Girl on the Train as Rachel Watson; Taraji P. Henson – Hidden Figures as Katherine Goble Johnson; Felicity Jones – Rogue One: A Star Wars Story as Jyn Erso; Jennifer Lawrence – Passengers as Aurora Lane; Narges Rashidi – Under the Shadow as Shideh
Best Supporting Actor	Best Supporting Actress
John Goodman – 10 Cloverfield Lane as Howard Stambler; Chadwick Boseman – Captain America: Civil War as T'Challa / Black Panther; Dan Fogler – Fantastic Beasts and Where to Find Them as Jacob Kowalski; Diego Luna – Rogue One: A Star Wars Story as Cassian Andor; Zachary Quinto – Star Trek Beyond as Commander Spock; Christopher Walken – The Jungle Book as King Louie	Tilda Swinton – Doctor Strange as The Ancient One; Betty Buckley – Split as Dr. Karen Fletcher; Bryce Dallas Howard – Gold as Kay; Scarlett Johansson – Captain America: Civil War as Natasha Romanoff / Black Widow; Kate McKinnon – Ghostbusters as Dr. Jillian "Holtz" Holtzmann; Margot Robbie – Suicide Squad as Harleen Quinzel / Harley Quinn
Best Performance by a Younger Actor	Best Music
Tom Holland – Captain America: Civil War as Peter Parker / Spider-Man; Ruby Barnhill – The BFG as Sophie; Julian Dennison – Hunt for the Wilderpeople as Ricky; Lewis MacDougall – A Monster Calls as Conor O'Malley; Neel Sethi – The Jungle Book as Mowgli; Anya Taylor-Joy – The Witch as Thomasin	La La Land – Justin Hurwitz; The BFG – John Williams; Doctor Strange – Michael Giacchino; Fantastic Beasts and Where to Find Them – James Newton Howard; Passengers – Thomas Newman; Rogue One: A Star Wars Story – Michael Giacchino
Best Editing	Best Production Design
The BFG – Michael Kahn; 10 Cloverfield Lane – Stefan Grube; Arrival – Joe Walker; Captain America: Civil War – Jeffrey Ford and Matthew Schmidt; The Jungle Book – Mark Livolsi; Rogue One: A Star Wars Story – John Gilroy, Colin Goudie, and Jabez Olssen	The BFG – Rick Carter and Robert Stromberg; Captain America: Civil War – Owen Paterson; Doctor Strange – Charles Woods; Fantastic Beasts and Where to Find Them – Stuart Craig; Passengers – Guy Hendrix Dyas; Rogue One: A Star Wars Story – Doug Chiang and Neil Lamont
Best Costume Design	Best Make-up
Fantastic Beasts and Where to Find Them – Colleen Atwood; Alice Through the Looking Glass – Colleen Atwood; The BFG – Joanna Johnston; Doctor Strange – Alexandra Byrne; The Handmaiden – Sang-gyeong Jo; Rogue One: A Star Wars Story – David Crossman and Glyn Dillon	Star Trek Beyond – Joel Harlow and Monica Huppert; Doctor Strange – Jeremy Woodhead; Fantastic Beasts and Where to Find Them – Nick Knowles; Rogue One: A Star Wars Story – Amy Byrne; Suicide Squad – Allan Apone, Jo-Ann MacNeil, and Marta Roggero; X-Men: Apocalypse – Charles Carter, Rita Ciccozzi, and Rosalina Da Silva
Best Special Effects	Best Independent Film
Rogue One: A Star Wars Story – John Knoll, Mohen Leo, Hal Hickel, and Neil Corbould; Arrival – Louis Morin and Ryal Cosgrove; The BFG – Joe Letteri and Joel Whist; Doctor Strange – Stephane Ceretti, Richard Bluff, and Vincent Cirelli; Fantastic Beasts and Where to Find Them – Tim Burke, Christian Manz, and David Watkins; The Jungle Book – Robert Legato, Adam Valdez, Andrew R. Jones, and Dan Lemmon	La La Land; Eye in the Sky; Hunt for the Wilderpeople; Lion; The Ones Below; Remember

=== Television ===
==== Programs ====
Best Science Fiction Television Series	Best Fantasy Television Series
Westworld (HBO); The 100 (The CW); Colony (USA Network); The Expanse (Syfy); Falling Water (USA Network); Incorporated (Syfy); Timeless (NBC)	Outlander (Starz); Beyond (Freeform); Game of Thrones (HBO); The Good Place (NBC); Lucifer (Fox); The Magicians (Syfy); Preacher (AMC)
Best Horror Television Series	Best Action-Thriller Television Series
The Walking Dead (AMC); American Horror Story: Roanoke (FX); Ash vs Evil Dead (Starz); The Exorcist (Fox); Fear the Walking Dead (AMC); Teen Wolf (MTV); The Vampire Diaries (The CW)	Riverdale (The CW); Animal Kingdom (TNT); Bates Motel (A&E); Designated Survivor (ABC); The Librarians (TNT); Mr. Robot (USA Network); Underground (WGN America)
Best Superhero Adaptation Television Series	Best New Media Television Series
Supergirl (The CW); Agents of S.H.I.E.L.D. (ABC); Arrow (The CW); The Flash (The CW); Gotham (Fox); Legion (FX)	Luke Cage (Netflix) (tie); Stranger Things (Netflix) (tie); Bosch (Amazon Prime Video); Daredevil (Netflix); The Man in the High Castle (Prime Video); A Series of Unfortunate Events (Netflix)
Best Animated Series or Film on Television	Best Television Presentation
Star Wars Rebels (Disney XD); BoJack Horseman (Netflix); Family Guy (Fox); The Little Prince (Netflix); The Simpsons (Fox); Trollhunters (Netflix)	11.22.63 (Hulu); Channel Zero (Syfy); Doctor Who: "The Return of Doctor Mysterio" (BBC America); Mars (National Geographic); The Night Manager (AMC); Rats (Discovery Channel)

==== Acting ====
Best Actor on Television	Best Actress on Television
Andrew Lincoln – The Walking Dead (AMC) as Rick Grimes; Bruce Campbell – Ash vs Evil Dead (Starz) as Ash Williams; Mike Colter – Luke Cage (Netflix) as Luke Cage; Charlie Cox – Daredevil (Netflix) as Matt Murdock / Daredevil; Grant Gustin – The Flash (The CW) as Barry Allen / Flash; Sam Heughan – Outlander (Starz) as James "Jamie" Fraser; Freddie Highmore – Bates Motel (A&E) as Norman Bates	Melissa Benoist – Supergirl (The CW) as Kara Danvers / Supergirl; Caitríona Balfe – Outlander (Starz) as Claire Fraser; Kim Dickens – Fear the Walking Dead (AMC) as Madison Clark; Vera Farmiga – Bates Motel (A&E) as Norma Bates; Lena Headey – Game of Thrones (HBO) as Cersei Lannister; Sarah Paulson – American Horror Story: Roanoke (FX) as Audrey Tindall, Lana Winters, & Shelby Miller; Winona Ryder – Stranger Things (Netflix) as Joyce Byers
Best Supporting Actor on Television	Best Supporting Actress on Television
Ed Harris – Westworld (HBO) as The Man in Black; Linden Ashby – Teen Wolf (MTV) as Sheriff Stilinski; Mehcad Brooks – Supergirl (The CW) as James Olsen; Kit Harington – Game of Thrones (HBO) as Jon Snow; Lee Majors – Ash vs Evil Dead (Starz) as Brock Williams; Norman Reedus – The Walking Dead (AMC) as Daryl Dixon; Jeffrey Wright – Westworld (HBO) as Bernard Lowe	Candice Patton – The Flash (The CW) as Iris West; Kathy Bates – American Horror Story: Roanoke (FX) as Agnes Mary Winstead & Thomasin White; Danai Gurira – The Walking Dead (AMC) as Michonne; Melissa McBride – The Walking Dead (AMC) as Carol Peletier; Thandie Newton – Westworld (HBO) as Maeve Millay; Adina Porter – American Horror Story: Roanoke (FX) as Lee Harris; Evan Rachel Wood – Westworld (HBO) as Dolores Abernathy
Best Guest Performance in a Television Series	Best Performance by a Younger Actor in a Television Series
Jeffrey Dean Morgan – The Walking Dead (AMC) as Negan; Ian Bohen – Teen Wolf (MTV) as Peter Hale; Tyler Hoechlin – Supergirl (The CW) as Clark Kent / Superman; Anthony Hopkins – Westworld (HBO) as Robert Ford; Leslie Jordan – American Horror Story: Roanoke (FX) as Ashley Gilbert; Dominique Pinon – Outlander (Starz) as Master Raymond	Millie Bobby Brown – Stranger Things (Netflix) as Eleven; KJ Apa – Riverdale (The CW) as Archie Andrews; Max Charles – The Strain (FX) as Zach Goodweather; Alycia Debnam-Carey – Fear the Walking Dead (AMC) as Alicia Clark; Lorenzo James Henrie – Fear the Walking Dead (AMC) as Chris Manawa; Chandler Riggs – The Walking Dead (AMC) as Carl Grimes

=== Home Entertainment ===
Best DVD or Blu-ray Release	Best DVD or Blu-ray Special Edition Release
Tales of Halloween; Dog Eat Dog; The Girl; The Lobster; The Man Who Knew Infinity; The Wailing	Phantasm: Remastered; Batman v Superman: Dawn of Justice (Ultimate Edition); The Hills Have Eyes (Limited Edition); The Iron Giant (Signature Edition); Mad Max: Fury Road (Black and Chrome Edition); Raising Cain (Collector's Edition)
Best DVD or Blu-ray Classic Film Release	Best DVD or Blu-ray Television Release
Time After Time; Destiny; Donovan's Brain; Gog 3D; It Came from Outer Space; The Little Girl Who Lives Down the Lane	Hannibal: The Complete Series Collection; Banshee: The Final Season; Mr. Robot: Season 2.0; Salem's Lot; Star Trek: The Animated Series; Versailles: Season One
Best DVD or Blu-ray Collection
Frankenstein: Complete Legacy Collection (Frankenstein, Bride of Frankenstein, Son of Frankenstein, The Ghost of Frankenstein, Frankenstein Meets the Wolf Man, House of Frankenstein, House of Dracula, and Abbott and Costello Meet Frankenstein); Buster Keaton Shorts 1917–23 (The Rough House, One Week, Convict 13, The Scarecrow, Neighbors, The Haunted House, Hard Luck, The High Sign, The Goat, The Playhouse, The Boat, The Paleface, Cops, My Wife's Relations, The Blacksmith, The Frozen North, The Electric House, Day Dreams, The Balloonatic, and The Love Nest); Herschell Gordon Lewis Feast (Blood Feast, Scum of the Earth!, Two Thousand Maniacs!, Moonshine Mountain, Color Me Blood Red, Something Weird, The Gruesome Twosome, A Taste of Blood, She-Devils on Wheels, Just for the Hell of It, How to Make a Doll, The Wizard of Gore, This Stuff'll Kill Ya!, and The Gore Gore Girls); Marx Brothers Silver Screen Collection (The Cocoanuts, Animal Crackers, Monkey Business, Horse Feathers, and Duck Soup); Pioneers of African American Cinema (Birthright, The Blood of Jesus, Body and Soul, The Bronze Buckaroo, By Right of Birth, Commandment Keeper Church, Beaufort South Carolina, May 1940, Darktown Revue, Dirty Gertie from Harlem USA, Eleven P.M., The Exile, The Flying Ace, God's Step Children, Heaven-Bound Traveler, Hellbound Train, Hot Biskits, Mercy the Mummy Mumbled, Regeneration, The Scar of Shame, S.S. Jones Home Movies, The Symbol of the Unconquered: A Story of the KKK, Ten Minutes to Live, Ten Nights in a Bar Room, Two Knights of Vaudeville, Veiled Aristocrats, Verdict Not Guilty, We Work Again, and Within Our Gates); The Wolf Man: Complete Legacy Collection (The Wolf Man, Frankenstein Meets the Wolf Man, House of Frankenstein, House of Dracula, Abbott and Costello Meet Frankenstein, Werewolf of London, and She-Wolf of London)

=== Live Stage Production ===
Best Local Live Stage Production
- A View from the Bridge (Ahmanson Theatre)
- Amadeus (L.A. Theatre Works)
- Cheng Ying Rescues the Orphan (Chinese Yu Opera)
- The Fantasticks (Pasadena Playhouse)
- Joseph and the Amazing Technicolor Dreamcoat (3D Theatricals)
- Moby Dick (South Coast Repertory)

=== Special awards ===
- The Life Career Award – Lee Majors
- The Visionary Award – Akiva Goldsman
- The Filmmakers Showcase Award – Rick Jaffa and Amanda Silver
- The Breakthrough Performance Award – KJ Apa
- The Special Recognition Award – Heavy Metal (magazine)

== Multiple nominations and wins ==
=== Film ===
The following works received multiple nominations:

11 nominations: Rogue One
10 nominations: The BFG, Doctor Strange
8 nominations: Captain America: Civil War
7 nominations: Fantastic Beasts and Where to Find Them
6 nominations: Arrival, The Jungle Book
5 nominations: Passengers
4 nominations: 10 Cloverfield Lane, Star Trek Beyond
3 nominations: Deadpool, Gold, Suicide Squad, X-Men: Apocalypse
2 nominations: Batman v Superman: Dawn of Justice, Ghostbusters, The Girl on the Train, The Handmaiden, Hell or High Water, Hidden Figures, Hunt for the Wilderpeople, La La Land, A Monster Calls, Split, Under the Shadow, The Witch

The following works received multiple wins:

3 wins: 10 Cloverfield Lane, Rogue One
2 wins: The BFG, Doctor Strange, La La Land

=== Television ===
The following works received multiple nominations:

7 nominations: The Walking Dead
6 nominations: Westworld
5 nominations: American Horror Story: Roanoke
4 nominations: Fear the Walking Dead, Outlander, Supergirl
3 nominations: Ash vs Evil Dead, Bates Motel, Game of Thrones, The Flash, Stranger Things, Teen Wolf
2 nominations: Marvel's Daredevil, Marvel's Luke Cage, Riverdale

The following works received multiple wins:

3 wins: The Walking Dead
2 wins: Stranger Things, Supergirl, Westworld, Riverdale
