= List of horror films of 1967 =

A list of horror films released in 1967.

Horror films released in 1967
Title	Director	Cast	Country	Notes
Berserk!	Jim O'Connolly	Joan Crawford, Ty Hardin, Judy Geeson	United Kingdom	
Blood of the Virgins	Emilio Vieyra	Ricardo Bauleo	Argentina	
Cauldron of Blood	Santos Alcocer	Boris Karloff, Viveca Windfors, Jean-Pierre Aumont	Spain; United States	
Creature of Destruction	Larry Buchanan	Aron Kincaid, Roger Ready, Les Tremayne	United States	
Even the Wind is Scared	Carlos Enrique Taboada	Marga López, Maricruz Olivier, Alicia Bonet	Mexico	
Eye of the Devil	J. Lee Thompson	Deborah Kerr, David Niven, Donald Pleasence, Edward Mulhare	United Kingdom	
The Fearless Vampire Killers	Roman Polanski	Roman Polanski, Jack MacGowran, Alfie Bass	United Kingdom; United States	
Frankenstein Created Woman	Terence Fisher	Peter Cushing, Susan Denberg, Thorley Walters, Robert Morris	United Kingdom	
The Frozen Dead	Herbert J. Leder	Dana Andrews, Anna Palk, Philip Gilbert	United Kingdom	
Games	Curtis Harrington	Simone Signoret, James Caan, Katharine Ross	United States	
The Gruesome Twosome	Herschell Gordon Lewis	Rodney Bedell, Elizabeth Davis, Michael Lewis	United States	
Hillbillys in a Haunted House	Jean Yarbrough	Ferlin Husky, Joi Lansing, Lon Chaney Jr.	United States	
It!	Herbert J. Leder	Roddy McDowall, Jill Haworth, Paul Maxwell	United States; United Kingdom	
Maneater of Hydra	Mel Welles	Cameron Mitchell, Elisa Montés, George Martin	Spain; West Germany	
The Mummy's Shroud	John Gilling	André Morell, John Phillips, David Buck	United Kingdom	
Night of the Big Heat	Terence Fisher	Peter Cushing, Christopher Lee	United Kingdom	
Quatermass and the Pit	Roy Ward Baker	James Donald, Barbara Shelley, Andrew Keir	United Kingdom	Science fiction horror
She Freak	Byron Mabe	William Bagdad, Claire Brennan, Lynn Courtney	United States	
The Shuttered Room	David Greene	Gig Young, Carol Lynley, Oliver Reed	United Kingdom	Science fiction horror
Something Weird	Herschell Gordon Lewis	Elizabeth Lee, Tony McCabe	United States	
The Sorcerers	Michael Reeves	Boris Karloff, Ian Ogilvy, Elizabeth Ercy	United Kingdom	
The Spirit Is Willing	William Castle	Sid Caesar, Vera Miles, Barry J. Gordon	United States	
A Taste of Blood	Herschell Gordon Lewis	Elizabeth Wilkinson, Dolores Carlos, Bill Rogers	United States	
Theatre of Death	Samuel Gallu	Christopher Lee, Lelia Goldoni, Jenny Till	United Kingdom	
This Night I'll Possess Your Corpse	José Mojica Marins	José Mojica Marins	Brazil	
Torture Garden	Freddie Francis	Jack Palance, Burgess Meredith, Beverly Adams	United Kingdom	
Viy	Konstantin Yershov	Leonid Kuravlev, Natalya Varley, Alexei Glazyrin	Soviet Union	
Zinda Laash	Khwaja Sarfraz	Deeba, Habib	India; Pakistan	

== Citations ==
- Barcinski, André (1998). Maldito: a vida e o cinema de José Mojica Marins, o Zé do Caixão. Editora 34. ISBN 85-7326-092-0.
- Hardy, Phil, ed. (1995). The Overlook Film Encyclopedia. Vol. 3. Overlook Press. ISBN 0-87951-624-0.
- Krafsur, Richard P., ed. (1997). The American Film Institute Catalog of Motion Pictures Produced in the United States: Feature Films, 1961–1970, Part 2. University of California Press. ISBN 0-520-20970-2.
