= Something Weird =

Something Weird may refer to:

- Something Weird Video, an American film distributor company
- Something Weird (film), a 1967 American exploitation film
