= Goldilocks and the Three Bares =

1963 film by Herschell Gordon Lewis

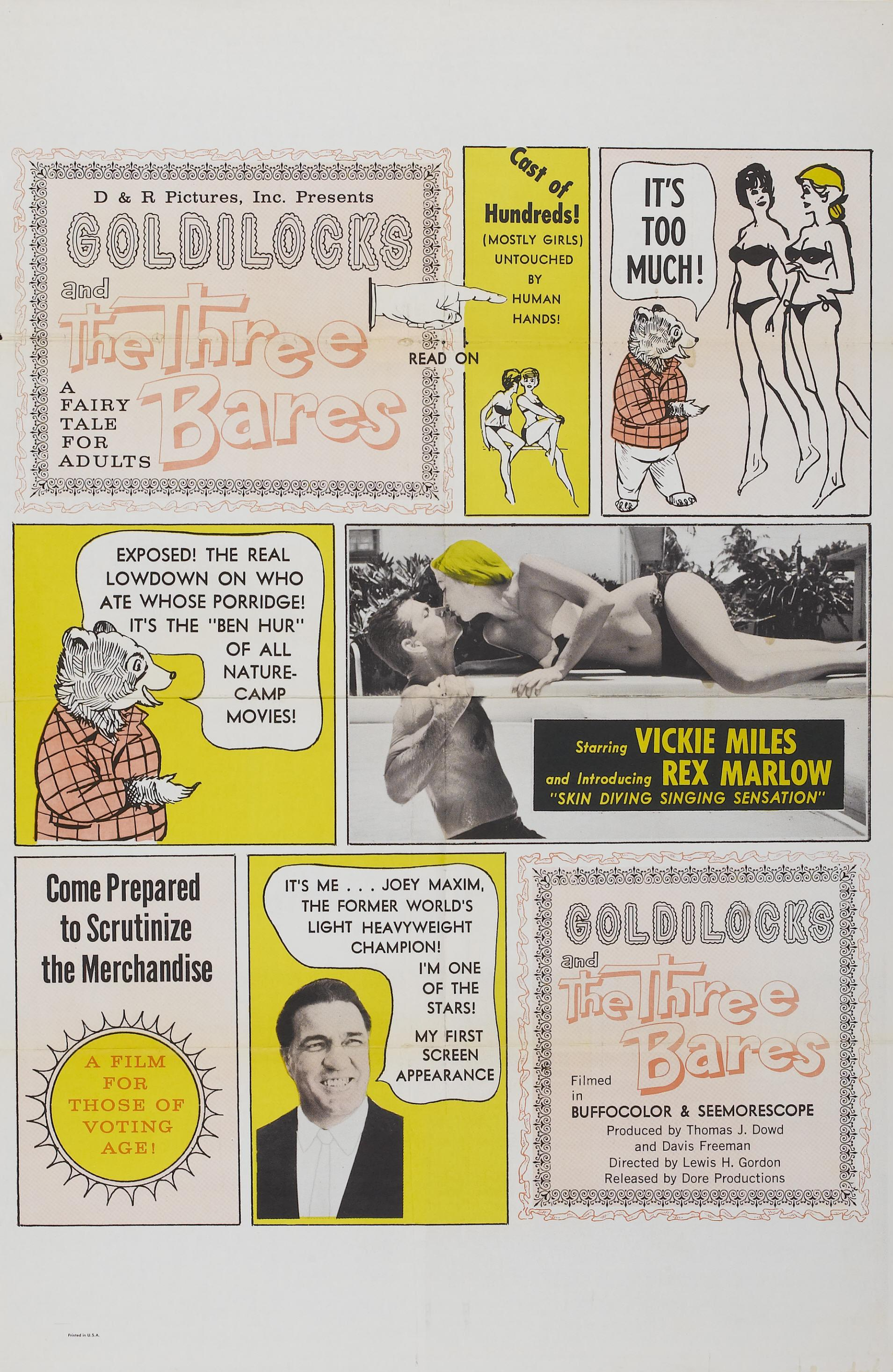
- Directed by: Herschell Gordon Lewis (as Lewis H. Gordon)
- Screenplay by: William R. Johnson
- Produced by: Thomas J. Dowd; David F. Friedman (as Davis Freeman)
- Starring: Rex Marlow; Allison Louise Downe; Alison Edwards (as Vickie Miles); William Kerwin (as Tommy Sweetwood); Netta Mallina; Gene Berk
- Cinematography: Herschell Gordon Lewis (as Marvin Lester)
- Music by: Lathrop Wells
- Production companies: D&R Pictures
- Distributed by: Dore Productions; Something Weird Video
- Release date: September 6, 1963
- Running time: 69 minutes
- Country: United States
- Language: English
- Budget: $25,000 estimated

Goldilocks and The Three Bares is a 1963 nudie-cutie film from the exploitation team of Herschell Gordon Lewis and David F. Friedman. The plot of the film has nothing to do with the famous fable which inspired the title. It was billed as the "first nudist musical" (not to be confused with The First Nudie Musical, 1976).

== Plot ==
The film follows the perils of nightclub singer Eddie Livingston, as he pursues press agent Alison Edwards. Livingston's comic foil Tommy Sweetwood is an unsuccessful comedian who manages to offend his entire audience in one way or another with his brash, insensitive humor. Alison likes Eddie enough, but she hides a dark secret; she is a nudist. The two go back and forth playing cat and mouse as Eddie sings a series of Bobby Vinton-ish ballads like "Good Things Happen When I'm with You".

One day, Tommy follows Alison on one of her clandestine weekend getaways and discovers her secret, promptly passing the information along to Eddie. Shocked, Eddie denounces Alison during a radio broadcast. But Tommy has been enlightened by his visit to the nudist camp, and plays Cupid for the star-crossed lovers, and the three soon decide to spend the next weekend at the camp. Eddie embraces the nudist lifestyle, and becomes a firm believer. This, of course, is parlayed through a lengthy set of sequences showing the film's characters enjoying a smattering of activities nude, such as horseback riding, yachting, swimming and water skiing.

== Cast ==
- Rex Marlow as Eddie Livingston
- Louise Downe as Allison Edwards (credited as Vickie Miles)
- William Kerwin as Tommy Sweetwood (credited as Tommy Sweetwood)
- Netta Mallina as Myrna McKay
- Gene Berk as Matt Eden (credited as Guy Bonde)
- Judy Parsons as Cynthia Martin (credited as Jean Clyde)
- Craig Maudslay Jr. as doorman at Sunshine Park / nudist
- William R. Johnson as Sonny Seymour (credited as Johnson R. Williams)
- Joey Maxim as Himself / nightclub owner

== History ==
With slightly higher production values than The Adventures of Lucky Pierre (1961) and Daughter of the Sun (1962), a series of artistically photographed musical sequences and somewhat more "star power", Goldilocks stands out from the other five entries of this phase of Lewis and Friedman's partnership. It also showcases the more clownish side of Lewis regular William Kerwin, who otherwise typically takes on the straight-edge, leading man role. His character's name, Tommy Sweetwood, is also the name under which he was billed, once again to avoid SAG regulations.

The "star power" of Goldilocks extends to the appearance of former world light heavyweight professional boxing champion Joey Maxim as the owner of his eponymous nightclub where Eddie and Tommy perform. Maxim was so unprepared for his role as himself that he would read his lines off his shirt cuff.

Another Lewis mainstay is Allison Louise Downe, appearing under the pseudonym Vicki Miles. The main star of the film, would-be crooner and nine-fingered Rex Marlow, was reportedly an employee of producer Thomas Dowd, who insisted (among many other things) that the film be a vehicle to springboard Marlow into stardom. Unfortunately for Marlow, his only other silver screen appearance would be in the Arch Hall Jr. western vanity project Deadwood 76. Ironically, in that film, Marlow does no singing at all.

The film was thought to be lost for over 36 years (Note: In the book A Taste of Blood: The Films of Herschell Gordon Lewis the film was still listed as being "lost" at the time of its first publication in 1998. It then made its video debut in 1999.) until Something Weird Video released it on VHS for the first time. Before its discovery, the writer of A Taste of Blood: The Films of Herschell Gordon Lewis, Christopher Wayne Curry, said in an interview with Lewis that he hoped the film would be found one day, to which Lewis replied, "Oh my, I hope not."

== Critical reception ==
Allmovie's review of the film was negative, writing "director Herschell Gordon Lewis turns in surprisingly dull work that doesn't hint at the quite individual style exhibited in many of his other films."
