= Daughter of the Sun (1962 film) =

1962 film by Herschell Gordon Lewis

- Directed by: Herschell Gordon Lewis
- Written by: David F. Friedman; Herschell Gordon Lewis
- Produced by: David F. Friedman
- Starring: Rusty Allen; Jerome Eden; Michael Borgine; Pearl Krohn; Avis Holmes; Darrin Ainsworth; Rockwell Morrow
- Cinematography: Herschell Gordon Lewis (as Marvin Lester Schmidt)
- Edited by: Elsie Kerbin (as Carroll Wurkes)
- Production company: Lucky Pierre Enterprises
- Release date: September 1962
- Running time: 60 minutes
- Country: United States

Daughter of the Sun is a 1962 sexploitation comedy film directed by Herschell Gordon Lewis and produced by David F. Friedman. The film follows a young teacher who may lose her job after she is discovered to be a nudist. Lewis and Friedman produced the film after the success of the 1961 nudie cutie The Adventures of Lucky Pierre.

== Synopsis ==
Schoolteacher Pamela is forced to defend herself before the board of education when it becomes known that she is a nudist. Curious about her account, Keith Lawrence goes with her to the nudist camp she is a member of so he can learn more about it.

== Cast ==
- Rusty Allen as Pamela Walker
- Jerome Eden as Keith Lawrence
- Michael Borgine as Grady Ives
- Pearl Krohn as Olive Simmons
- Avis Holmes as Martha Barns
- Darrin Ainsworth as Boyd Greshen
- Rockwell Morrow as Narrator

== Production ==
The film followed up on the success of The Adventures of Lucky Pierre, a color film of the nudie cutie genre. Lewis and Friedman were determined to make a fourth film together, and decided to produce one in the nudist camp film genre, which was popular at the time. Since no nudist camps existed near Chicago at the time, Lewis and Friedman relocated to film on location in Miami, Florida. Daughter of the Sun was the first of many of Lewis' films to be shot in Miami, and to star Jerome Eden who later became a frequent collaborator of Lewis.

Despite the box office success of Lucky Pierre, Lewis and Friedman did not feel they would be able to finance another color film quickly enough to capitalize on Lucky Pierre's success. Their solution was to shoot the majority of the film on cheaper black-and-white film, leaving the more expensive color film for the nude scenes. Rusty Allen, then working as a cigarette girl, was hired as the lead for her good looks and was billed as "the most beautiful woman in the world".

== Reception ==
Daughter of the Sun was a minor box office success and was screened in theatres for several years after its release, although it did not match the success of Lucky Pierre.
