= Daughter of the Sun =

Daughter of the Sun may refer to:

- Daughter of the Sun (1962 film), a film directed by Herschell Gordon Lewis
- Daughter of the Sun (2023 film), a film directed by Ryan Ward
- Daughters of the Sun, a film directed by Mariam Shahriar
