= Jimmy, the Boy Wonder =

- Something Weird Video cover
- Directed by: Herschell Gordon Lewis
- Written by: Hal Berg
- Produced by: Hal Berg
- Starring: Dennis Jones; Nancy Jo Berg
- Cinematography: Andy Romanoff
- Edited by: Richard C. Brinkman
- Music by: Larry Wellington
- Distributed by: Mayflower Productions
- Release date: 1966
- Running time: 70 min.
- Language: English

Jimmy, the Boy Wonder is a 1966 children's musical film about a boy, played by Dennis Jones, who successfully stops time. The film is one of two children's features directed by Herschell Gordon Lewis, the other being The Magic Land of Mother Goose, who is better known for his gory splatter films. It was described as a "glorious bomb" by the Scarecrow Video Movie Guide.

== Plot ==
Jimmy is a young boy who is tired of the drudgery of his daily routine. One morning, Jimmy shouts out, "I wish time would stop!" At that very moment, the "master clock" that makes time run opens to power itself with the light of the sun, rendering it vulnerable to even a simple wish; it hears Jimmy's wish, and everyone (except Jimmy) is frozen in their tracks. Observing this catastrophe is a magical astronomer, who sends his daughter Aurora to talk Jimmy into helping her undo the damage, before the time freeze becomes permanent. As Jimmy and Aurora travel to a region called the World's End so that Jimmy can replace the magical Golden Globe in the master clock to set time running again, they are hounded by an evil wizard known as Mr. Fig, who seizes the chance to take over the world for himself. Jimmy and Aurora's travels take them through various places which include "slow motion playground", "night and day land", encounters with green-skinned Indians calling for rain, etc. all the while with Mr. Fig trying to stop them at nearly every turn on their mission.

== Cast ==
- Nancy Jo Berg as Aurora
- Dennis Jones as Jimmy Jaye
- David Blight Jr. as Mr. Fig
- Karl Stoeber as the astronomer
- Alan Rock as the medicine man

== Production ==
The film was shot entirely in Florida in and around Coral Gables. The Coral Castle was used as the backdrop for both the Astronomer's home as well as the coral maze of the World's End at the film's climax. Its working title was The Enchanted Globe.

== Critical reception ==
Allmovie panned the film, writing "Jimmy, the Boy Wonder is crafted as crudely as anything from this director's oeuvre, resulting in a crass, slapdash kid pic, that undoubtedly led to restlessness and boredom in children and angry parents at the box office arguing about refunds."
