= Brooke McCarter =

American actor (1963–2015)

- Born: Brooke McCarter Jr. April 22, 1963; Bryn Mawr, Pennsylvania, U.S.
- Died: December 22, 2015 (aged 52); Tampa, Florida, U.S.
- Occupations: Actor, producer, director, composer, musician
- Years active: 1986–2015
- Children: 1
- Website: brookemccarter.com (Archived)

Brooke McCarter (April 22, 1963 – December 22, 2015) was an American actor, producer, director, composer and musician. He is known for the role of Paul in the 1987 vampire horror comedy The Lost Boys.

== Background ==
McCarter was born in Bryn Mawr, Pennsylvania, the son of Maria and Brooke McCarter. Brooke was born with athletic and musical talent. Sponsored by Ektelon, Brooke won dozens of trophies, was second in the state of Ohio for the Under 18 division, and earned a racquetball scholarship to University of Memphis. He spent two years in Memphis and one year at Ohio University.

After winning a modeling contest, Brooke was signed to the Ford modeling agency and moved to New York City, where he studied with acting coach icon Stella Adler and recorded music in the studio. Upon moving to Los Angeles, he made his acting debut in the 1986 skater drama Thrashin'. During the filming of The Lost Boys, McCarter became friends with his co-star Corey Haim and became his manager through the 1990s. After having a small part in the John Belushi biographical film Wired (1989), he went on a hiatus from acting to focus on other projects. As a composer, he scored the film Fast Getaway (1991) and the documentary Leaves of Green (2002), which he also directed. He returned to acting in 2009 in Herschell Gordon Lewis's The Uh-Oh! Show.

== Career ==
McCarter appeared in such films as Thrashin' in 1986, Wired in 1989, The Uh-oh Show in 2009, and the 1980s television reboot series The Twilight Zone. McCarter began his career in the entertainment industry as a model with the Ford modeling agency in New York City after winning a national talent search. He soon began doing major campaigns for companies such as Levi's and JCPenney. He engaged in a performing arts curriculum of voice, dance and acting. He then studied with acting coach icon Stella Adler. Upon completing his New York education, he moved to Los Angeles and began working on national commercials for major products such as Pepsi, Miller and Chevrolet.

McCarter's first feature film, Thrashin', a skateboard movie which also featured Tony Hawk, Josh Brolin and the Red Hot Chili Peppers. He later acted in a co-starring role in the 1980s vampire film The Lost Boys. McCarter appeared in TV shows such as The Twilight Zone and Route 66. His last feature film was Wired, about the life of John Belushi starring Michael Chiklis.

He was also a drummer and music programmer, and scored independent feature films such as Fast Getaway and documentaries such as Leaves of Green, on which he also served as director.

In 1998, he took a ten-year hiatus from Hollywood to work in the telecommunications industry. During this time he moved to Tampa, Florida, to raise his daughter as a single dad. In 2009, McCarter returned to acting with the lead role in horror icon Herschell Gordon Lewis's Uh-Oh! Show. In recent years he toured horror conventions throughout the U.S. and abroad with his Lost Boys co-stars. He also toured the U.S. as a drummer and could be seen in venues throughout the Tampa Bay area hand drumming with his djembes, bongos, congas and tambourines.

== Death ==
McCarter died in Tampa, Florida on December 22, 2015, at the age of 52 from the genetic liver disorder Alpha-1 antitrypsin deficiency (A1AD). His death increased awareness of this rare disorder, according to the Alpha-1 Foundation.

== Filmography ==
=== Film ===
Year	Film	Role	Notes
1986	Thrashin'	Tyler	Credited as Brooke McCarter Jr.
1987	The Lost Boys	Paul	
1989	Wired	Punk Rocker	
2009	The Uh-Oh! Show	Jackie	
2011	Emerging Past	Dylan	Direct-to-DVD

=== Television ===
Year	Show	Role	Notes
1987	The Twilight Zone	Greg	1 Episode, Joy Ride

=== Video games ===
Year	Game Title	Role	Notes
1993	Double Switch	Bang	

=== Music videos ===
Year	Title	Artist	Role	Notes
1989	"I Want That Man"	Deborah Harry	Paul	
