= Gruesome Twosome =

Gruesome Twosome may refer to:

- A Gruesome Twosome, a 1945 Warner Bros. Merrie Melodies cartoon featuring Tweety Bird
- The Gruesome Twosome (1967 film), film directed by Herschell Gordon Lewis
- The Gruesome Twosome in the Creepy Coupe 02, recurring characters in the animated 1968 Hanna-Barbera series, Wacky Races
- The Gruesome Twosome Tour, a 2010 concert tour featuring Rob Zombie and Alice Cooper
- "Gruesome Twosome", a 1961 episode of The Dick Tracy Show
- A nickname for Frank and Charlie, from the TV series It's Always Sunny in Philadelphia
