= The Adventures of Lucky Pierre =

1961 film by Herschell Gordon Lewis

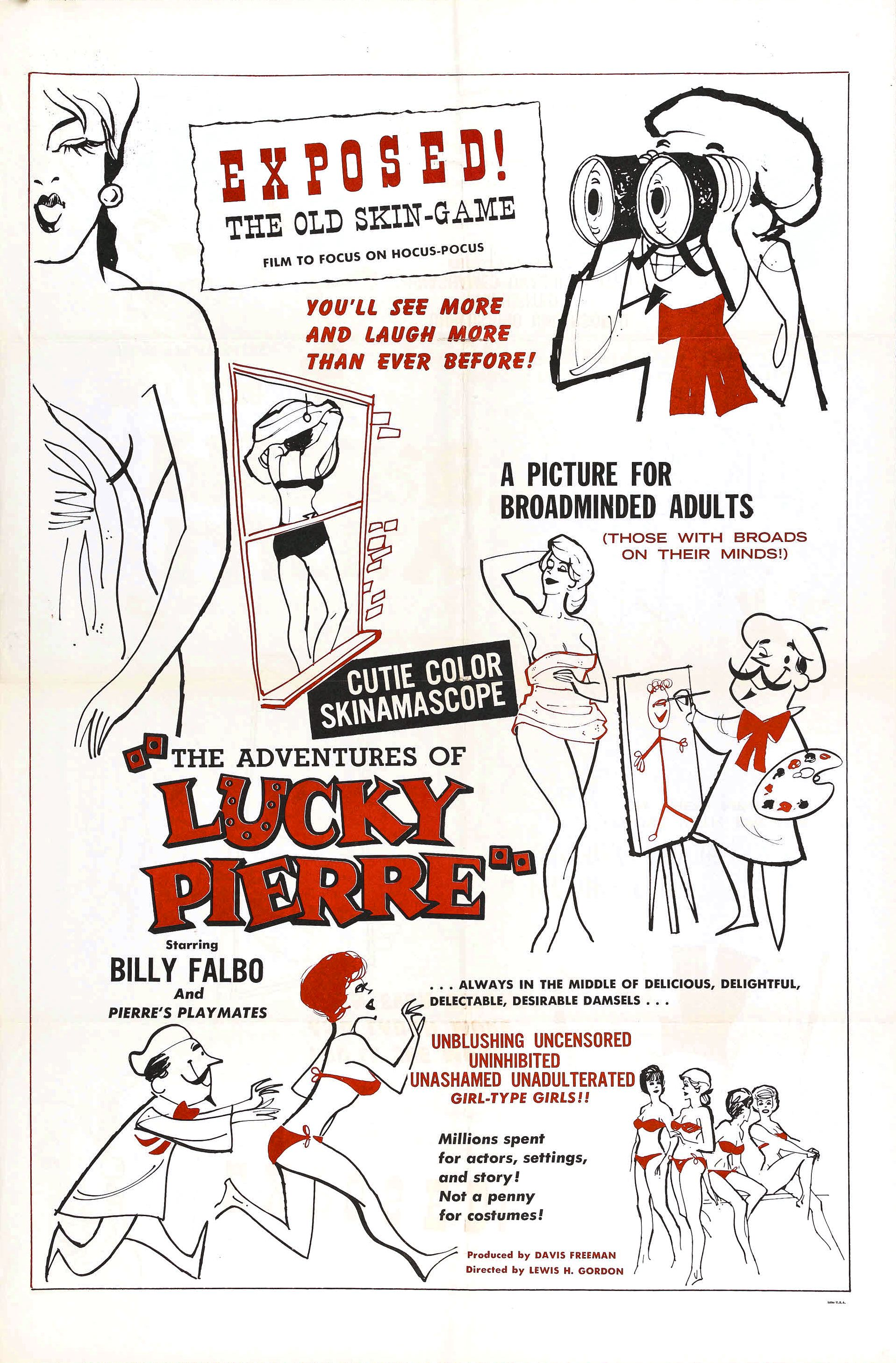
- Directed by: Herschell Gordon Lewis (credited as Lewis H. Gordon)
- Starring: Billy Falbo; Lawrence J. Aberwood (as Lawrence Wood); William Kerwin
- Cinematography: Herschell Gordon Lewis
- Music by: Herschell Gordon Lewis; Larry Wellington
- Production company: Lucky Pierre Enterprises
- Distributed by: Something Weird Video
- Release date: 1961
- Running time: 60 minutes
- Country: United States
- Language: English
- Budget: US $7,500

The Adventures of Lucky Pierre is a 1961 nudie cutie film created by exploitation filmmakers Herschell Gordon Lewis and David F. Friedman. The first of its kind to be filmed in color, the film starred comedian Billy Falbo.

== History ==
The film was conceived by Lewis and Friedman when film distributor Alfred N. Sack offered the two $7,000 to create a single-reel, "color 35mm film of cute girls carousing around with beach balls, or whatever." Upon learning of this reel, another distributor offered a deal to expand the film into a full-length feature film. The two spent around five hours writing the film, and, with Falbo, proceeded to film the movie over a four-day period in Chicago, Illinois.

== Plot ==
The Adventures of Lucky Pierre is a series of vignettes featuring the title character, Lucky Pierre, in a series of unrelated storylines involving scantly-clad or nude women. Pierre, named after a childhood rhyme Friedman and Lewis remembered, would end up in a short segment where he encounters various naked women – for instance, in "Drive-In Me Crazy", Pierre attends a drive-in movie where the ticket taker and concession workers are all nude women who also appear in the film he's seeing. In another, Pierre, as a painter, has three nude women posing for him in a park, and another vignette had Pierre come upon two sunbathing women while birdwatching.

== Cast ==
- Billy Falbo as Pierre
- Lawrence J. Aberwood as the announcer (as Lawrence Wood)
- William Kerwin as man who hires the plumber
- Kay Montie as Pierre's playmate
- Linda Cotton as Pierre's playmate
- Pat O'Farrell as Pierre's playmate
- Dorothy Holbrook as Pierre's playmate
- Toni Carroll as Pierre's playmate
- Ginger Hale as Pierre's playmate
- Gail Jordan as Pierre's playmate

== Reception ==
The film was a financial success, grossing over $12,000 in a single theater over a week's run upon opening, and continued to enjoy financial success while avoiding the type of censorship previous exploitation films such as Mom and Dad faced. The film ushered in a new form of sexploitation film, the "nudie cutie", and Friedman, who worked with the American Film Institute to catalog such films for them, estimated over 600 Pierre-style films were released between 1961 and 1970.

== Notes ==
- DVD Talk: "CineSchlock-O-Rama: Herschell Gordon Lewis: The Godfather of Gore." G. Noel Gross, 27 April 2001. URL accessed 28 May 2007.
- David F. Friedman, A Youth in Babylon: Confessions of a Trash-Film King (Buffalo, N.Y.: Prometheus Books, 1990; ISBN 0-87975-608-X).
- Internet Movie Database: The Adventures of Lucky Pierre. URL accessed 28 May 2007.
- Blythe, Will (December 1, 2002). "I Lost It at the Movies". The New York Times.
- Pitchfork Media: L. Pierre - Dip review. URL accessed 28 May 2007.
- Mike Quarles, Down and Dirty: Hollywood's Exploitation Filmmakers and Their Movies (Jefferson, North Carolina, McFarland, 2001; ISBN 0-7864-1142-2).
- Reel.com: "David F. Friedman: Wage Earner of Sin." URL accessed 28 May 2007.
- Adam Rockoff, Going to Pieces: The Rise and Fall of the Slasher Film, 1978-1986. (McFarland & Company; 2002; ISBN 0-7864-1227-5).
- Something Weird Video: The Adventures of Lucky Pierre. URL accessed 28 May 2007.
