= Godfather of Gore =

Godfather of Gore may refer to:

- Herschell Gordon Lewis (1929-2016), American filmmaker
- Lucio Fulci (1927–1996), Italian film director, screenwriter, and actor
- Tom Savini (born 1946), American actor, stuntman, director, and special effects and makeup artist
