= Scum of the Earth! =

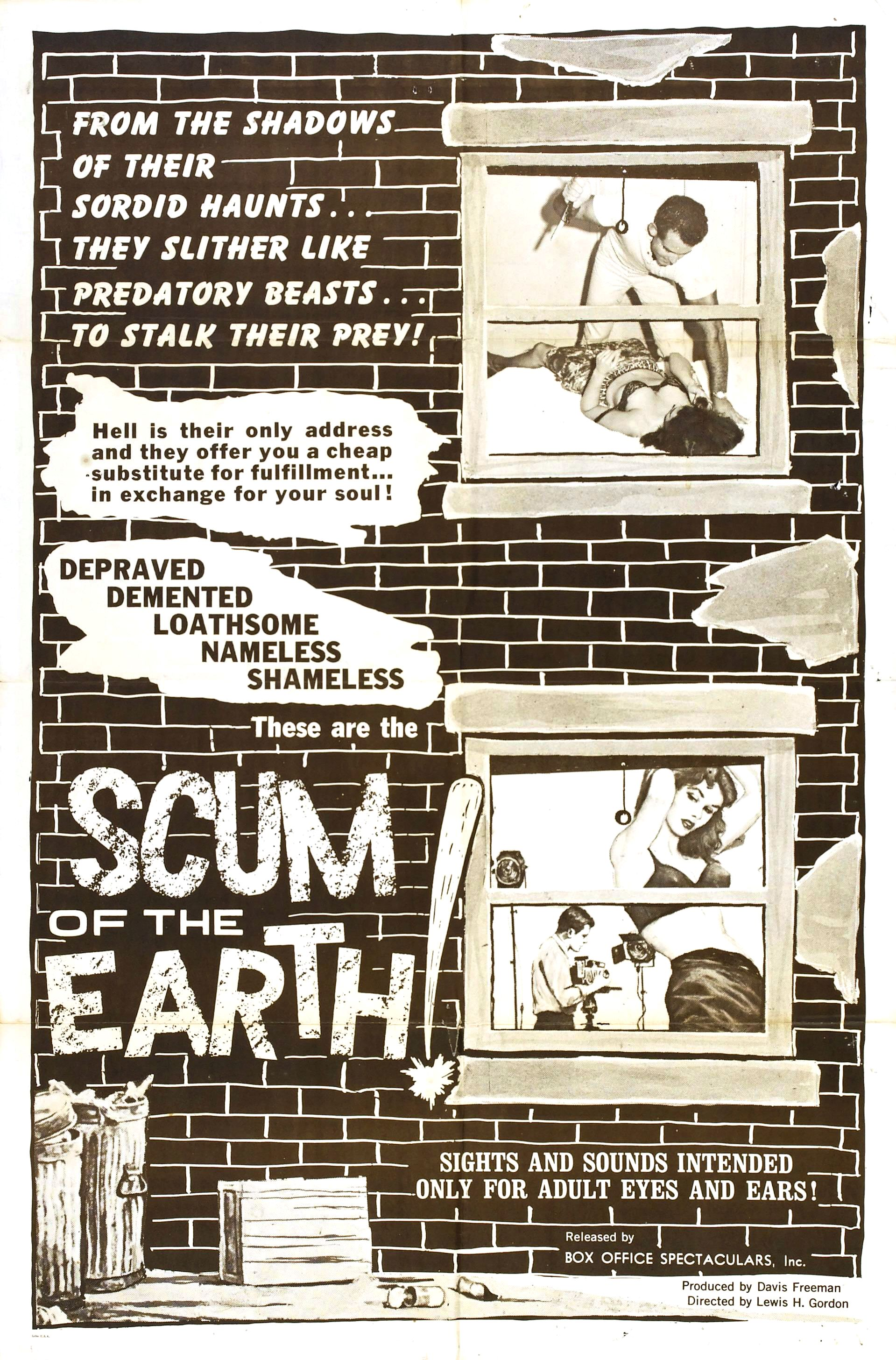
- Directed by: Herschell Gordon Lewis
- Written by: Herschell Gordon Lewis
- Produced by: David F. Friedman
- Starring: William Kerwin; Allison Louise Downe; Lawrence J. Aberwood
- Cinematography: Herschell Gordon Lewis
- Edited by: Patrick Murphy
- Music by: Manuel Ortiz
- Distributed by: Box Office Spectaculars
- Release date: October 8, 1963
- Running time: 73 minutes
- Country: United States
- Language: English
- Budget: $75,000

Scum of the Earth! (also known as Sam Flynn) is a 1963 American exploitation film written and directed by Herschell Gordon Lewis and produced by David F. Friedman. It is credited as being the first film in the "roughie" genre.

== Synopsis ==
Harmon Johnson is the photographer for a small pornography ring that uses deception and blackmail to coerce its models into performing. Although Harmon is complicit in the crime and takes a cynical attitude to the proceedings, he treats the models more kindly than the rest of the gang.

His current model, Sandy, is nearing the end of her career and begs to be released from her service. Lang, the leader of the operation, agrees on condition that she will procure and help manage new models to continue the cycle. Sandy agrees and her first victim is a naive young girl named Kim, who wishes to save money to go to college. Harmon gets her hooked on modeling by overpaying for some relatively tame "shoe" ads that show off Kim's legs. When she comes looking for more work, Harmon entices her with doing more explicit photos. During this activity a helper, Larry, snaps even more explicit photos and the group blackmails her into doing further work.

Meanwhile, Marie, another model, grows tired of the threats and actual violence against her and talks about going to the police with Sandy. Larry and Ajax, a thug and pornographic performer employed by the gang, overhear this and Ajax kidnaps Marie off the street, takes her to a motel room and rapes and beats her severely. When he leaves, Marie calls the police.

Kim is distraught at her situation, but Larry and the gang convince her that it will all be behind her if she agrees to one more day of shooting. However, during the shoot, Ajax continues to menace the girls and threatens to rape Kim. Finally having enough, Harmon intervenes on the girls' behalf, killing Ajax with a baseball bat. Realizing that this will cause the police to investigate, Harmon gives Kim all her negatives and other material and tells her to run away.

During a police interrogation, Harmon is then unexpectedly saved by Sandy, and they decide to get married.

Hearing of the encroaching police, Lang makes a run for it, but is pursued until he runs into the ocean and, cornered, shoots himself. In the dénouement, Sandy counsels Kim to pretend it was all a dream.

== Cast ==
- William Kerwin as Harmon Johnson (credited as Thomas Sweetwood)
- Allison Louise Downe as Kim Sherwood (credited as Vickie Miles)
- Lawrence J. Aberwood as Lang (credited as Lawrence Wood)
- Sandra Sinclair as Sandy (credited as Sandy Sinclair)
- Mal Arnold as Larry
- Craig Maudslay Jr. as Ajax
- Christy Foushee as Marie (credited as Toni Calvert)
- Doug Brennan as Carl
- Christina Castel as Cindy, the model
- Edward Mann as Mr. Sherwood
- Lou Youngman as Dave, punk in diner
- William Caulder as Joe, punk in diner

== Production ==
In his autobiography, David F. Friedman wrote that Scum of the Earth was shot in six days, just two weeks after filming on Blood Feast had ended and was filmed in most of the same Miami and Miami Beach locations as in the previous film. It was filmed in black-and-white not to save money, but to intentionally give it a dirty look, "like an old, scratched 16 mm stag film." Friedman had the idea of promoting the film a week before its showing by giving theater audiences comic books of the story.

== Critical reception ==
Allmovie wrote, "Unintentionally funny and poorly photographed, this film certainly has its moments for connoisseurs of bad cinema, but others will find it tawdry and dull."

== Availability ==
Something Weird Video released Scum of the Earth on DVD with The Defilers (1964) on 20 February 2001. It is also available on the Arrow Video Blu-ray release of Blood Feast (1963) as a special feature.

== See also ==
- List of American films of 1963
