= Suburban Roulette =

- Directed by: Herschell Gordon Lewis
- Written by: Herschell Gordon Lewis; James Thomas
- Produced by: Herschell Gordon Lewis
- Starring: Elizabeth Wilkinson; Ben Moore
- Release date: June 1968
- Running time: 91 minutes
- Country: United States
- Language: English

Suburban Roulette is a 1968 American drama film directed by Herschell Gordon Lewis and starring William Kerwin and Allison Louise Downe as characters who are involved in wife swapping to overcome the boredom of living in the suburbs.

It was produced as an independent film by Lewis and was shown in Chicago area movie theaters during the summer of 1968. It contains implied sex, boozing, adult themes, fighting, but is without nudity (which would have prohibited mainstream movie theater distribution).

It was filmed in Wood Dale, Illinois, a suburb of Chicago during the summer of 1967.

== Plot ==
The Fisher family, which makes up of Bert and Ilene Fisher and their 13-year-old daughter Cindy, move into the seemingly perfect suburban neighborhood to get away from the nearby city of Chicago. Private marital troubles between the Fishers include Bert's drinking problem, and Ilene's propensity for other men. On their first day living in "suburbia", they meet the neighbors, Ron and Margo Elston, who invite them to a pool party at the Elston house. Bert and Ilene have cocktails, partake in a cookout, and flirting with each other's mates, but not without guilt and repercussions. The Fishers fall into a dangerous game of wife swapping until the unwilling Bert can't take it any more. Ignoring the presence of the other guests, including Ron's wife Margo, Ilene succumbs to the advances of Ron and has sex with him in a bedroom.

In the weeks that follow, Ilene and Ron's secret affair heats up as the Fishers and Elstons join a third couple, Fran and Marty Conley, whom appear to be the perfect conservative suburban family complete with raising four kids, but they are in fact closeted swingers. The three couples partake in drunken parties at each of their houses which eventually leads one evening to them playing a form of roulette in which the prize is someone else's marital partner for the night.

Outraged by everyone's immorality, including his own, Bert demands to Ilene that they move out of the neighborhood, but Ilene refuses for she has quiet confidence that Ron will divorce Margo and marry her to make a new life for themselves. But one evening, when Ilene confides in Ron about her choice to leave her husband, Ron makes is clear to Ilene that his interest in her is only physical and that he has no intention of breaking up his family.

Depressed over this turn of events, Ilene attempts suicide by taking an overdose of sleeping pills, but is saved from death by Burt and their daughter, Cindy, who find her in time and rush her to the hospital. In the final scenes, Ilene and Burt and their daughter move out of the neighborhood to another location to resolve to try to save their marriage, while the debauched Ron and Margo, Fran and Marty, begin to look for new participants in their continuing game of suburban roulette.

== Cast ==
Lewis was known for using everyday people instead of actors in his films.

- Elizabeth Wilkinson as Ilene Fisher
- Ben Moore as Bert Fisher
- Ione Rolnick as Fran Conley
- William Kerwin (credited as Thomas Wood) as Marty Conley
- Allison Louise Downe (credited as Vicki Miles) as "Mattress Back" Margo Elston
- Tony McCabe as Ron Elston
- Debbie Grant as Cindy Fisher
- Richard Mark Oliver as Conley child
- Joseph Trucco as Conley child
- Michael Shallop as Conley child
- Paul Shallop as Conley child
- Ray Woods as Police Chief
- Bob Roth as card buyer
