= The Girl, the Body, and the Pill =

- Theatrical release poster
- Directed by: Herschell Gordon Lewis
- Written by: Allison Louise Downe
- Produced by: Herschell Gordon Lewis; Sidney J. Reich
- Starring: Pamela Rhae; Bill Rogers; Valedia Hill; Nancy Lee Noble; Roy Collodi
- Distributed by: Box Office Spectaculars
- Release date: 1967
- Running time: 80 minutes
- Country: United States
- Language: English

The Girl, the Body, and the Pill (also known as The Pill) is a 1967 American sex comedy film directed by Herschell Gordon Lewis and starring Pamela Rhea and Bill Rogers. The film approaches the subject of the contraceptive pill through multiple perspectives.

== Plot ==
A liberal high school teacher advocates for sex education as a means of promoting proper hygiene among her rapidly developing adolescent students. Her efforts to promote planned parenthood meet with fierce opposition from the schoolboard as well as the parents of several of the students. Actually, one parent in particular, the hyperprotective puritanical father of a virginal daughter whose boyfriend wants to go all the way, is the loudest voice to oppose such education. The film additionally follows the exploits of the school's most promiscuous student, Randy, and that of her considerably more promiscuous single mother.

As part of her co-ed hygiene curriculum, Pamela has begun recently to encroach the subject of sex, despite lack of official backing from the schoolboard. Soon, the school principal expresses disapproval of this curriculum, forcing Pamela to continue to conduct the classes in her own home. The daughter of the chief opponent to this hygienic education meanwhile struggles with balancing her love of her boyfriend with maintaining her prudence. A lustful group of teenage boys, one of whom is currently engaging in relations with Randy, discuss their collective attraction to Pamela. Upon further investigation, Pamela becomes outraged that the local pharmacies refuse to dispense birth control to teenage girls out of principle. Randy, meanwhile, is in danger of running out of her contraceptive pills, prompting her to steal them from her mother and replace them with saccharine tablets. Lucky for her, as Randy's "boyfriend" decides to share his good fortune among his group of oversexed teenage male friends one night in the back seat of his car, in spite of Randy's resistance.

While all this goes on, Rogers, who clearly states his dissatisfaction in his own marriage and frustration over the fact that their daughter was an unplanned pregnancy, sets out to gather support for his cause from some of the other parents. Of course, who does he contact first but Randy's mom. It doesn't take long before he hypocritically succumbs to the temptation of the truck-stop vixen, and carries on an affair. Confident in the effectiveness of her birth control, Valenia thinks nothing of protection during this triste until, lo and behold, she becomes pregnant. Meanwhile, Rogers' daughter stands her ground and maintains her virtue, prompting her boyfriend to hook up with Randy to satisfy his burgeoning needs. An attempt to rape Pamela, an abortion, and a series of redemption-seeking sequences closes out the film.

== Cast ==
- Pamela Rhea as Marcia Barrington
- Bill Rogers as Wesley Nichols
- Valedia Hill as Irene Hunt
- Nancy Lee Noble as Randy Hunt
- Otto Schlesinger as Mr. Price
- Roy Collodias as Pike Grover
- George Brownas as Brad Martin
- Eleanor Vaillas as Grace Nichols
- James Nelsonas as Ray Stanton
- Kay Rossas as Alice Nichols

== Release ==
The film premiered in the United States in New Orleans in October 1967."
