= The Gore Gore Girls =

1972 film by Herschell Gordon Lewis

- Directed by: Herschell Gordon Lewis
- Written by: Alan J. Dachman
- Produced by: Herschell Gordon Lewis
- Starring: Frank Kress; Amy Farrell; Hedda Lubin; Henny Youngman
- Cinematography: Alex Ameri
- Edited by: Alex Ameri
- Music by: Herschell Gordon Lewis
- Distributed by: Lewis Motion Picture Enterprises
- Release date: September 22, 1972
- Running time: 95 minutes
- Country: United States
- Language: English

The Gore Gore Girls is a 1972 comedy horror splatter film directed by Herschell Gordon Lewis.

In the film, a reporter and a private investigator start investigating the brutal murder of a stripper. Soon enough, there is an entire series of murders targeting strippers. The investigating duo encounters several eccentric suspects, including a mentally unstable Vietnam War veteran.

== Plot ==
Nancy Weston, a reporter for The Globe, approaches Abraham Gentry, an obnoxious private investigator, and offers him $25,000 on behalf of The Globe to investigate the brutal murder of stripper Suzie Cream Puff. She sweetens the deal with a $25,000 bonus for solving the case. Of course this comes contingent that The Globe gets the exclusive story. Gentry takes the case and begins the investigation of the murder with Weston in tow. When at the club, Gentry encounters a waitress, Marlene (Hedda Lubin), whose obnoxiousness rivals his. He gets through her to speak to another stripper and gets his first suspect, Joseph Carter.

Soon, another stripper, Candy Cane, gets murdered and Gentry expands his suspect list to Grout, an unstable veteran who takes pride in crushing the heads of corpses he found when on the battlefields of Vietnam. He relieves tension by drawing faces on squashes and tomatoes and then crushing them with his bare hands. Gentry also suspects the leader of a radical feminist group that riots in the strip club, carrying banners with catchy phrases like "Lewd is Crude", "Quit with Tit" and "Women Right On!". Lola Prize, also known as Pickles, another stripper, is murdered and her buttocks are mutilated with a meat tenderizer hammer before they are salted and peppered. A badge with "Women Right On!" is found at the scene.

Meanwhile, Gentry buys Weston many drinks to keep her drunk and out of his way. During one of Weston's drunken episodes she admits she is attracted to Gentry. Gentry ignores this and concentrates on the case. His investigation takes him to the owner of the strip clubs in town, Mr. Marzdone Mobilie. Gentry then coerces Mobilie into holding an amateur stripper contest with a $1,000 prize, which also works as the beginning of a plan for Gentry's trap.

After having a few too many drinks, Gentry encourages Weston to perform the amateur stripper contest in which she goes all out by "taking it all off" and wins the $1,000 cash prize. Gentry accompanies Weston back to her apartment and lets her rest on her couch as he seemingly leaves. Soon, the killer arrives and Gentry, who anticipated that the killer would do just that, appears after hiding behind a door and takes off the killer's hood revealing Marlene. He also further reveals more when he pulls off her shirt revealing burn marks on her chest, literally obscuring her breasts. After a brief struggle, Marlene falls out a balcony window and lands on the street below where her head is crushed by an oncoming car.

Gentry then reveals his case in a long monologue to Nancy Weston about following the clues which Gout told him earlier about Marlene being burned in a fire which her breasts were burned off. She had been a stripper herself and this drew the conclusion that she was killing all those strippers out of jealousy and hatred to their own beauty which Marlene's was now taken from her. Weston is somewhat angry that Gentry used her as bait to trap Marlene into revealing herself as the killer, but accepts for the risk was worth it. Gentry and Weston profess their love for each other as she tells him that the story will make a great contribution to The Globe and both of them get "down to business", before Gentry looks at the camera and tells the viewers that the movie is over and to leave them alone.

The closing title card then appears reading: "We announce with pride: this movie is over!"

== Cast ==
- Frank Kress as Abraham Gentry
- Amy Farrell as Nancy Weston
- Hedda Lubin as Marlene
- Henny Youngman as Marzdone Mobilie
- Russ Badger as Lt. Anderson
- Jackie Kroeger as Suzie Cream Puff
- Nora Alexis as Lola Prize

== Release ==
The Gore Gore Girls was released on home video by the now-defunct Midnight Video distribution company on VHS in the mid 1980s. The film was first released on DVD by Something Weird Video in 2000, digitally mastered and featuring audio commentary by Herschell Gordon Lewis.

The film was refused classification in Australia by the Office of Film and Literature Classification upon its review in 2005, and remains banned in the country.

== Critical reception ==
The reception of the film was polarized, but more positive than Lewis's previous films. The violence and gore was seen by some as excessive and the film's acting performances were criticized as well. However, the film's themes on sex-positivity, Vietnam War trauma, and modesty were seen to have merit. Allmovie wrote, "Herschell Gordon Lewis' final feature is so crudely lensed and unrelentingly violent that it's tempting to believe the whole thing was made solely as a prank", calling it "a fascinatingly sick swan song". Sean Leonard from HorrorNews.net gave the film a positive review, writing, "The Gore Gore Girls features decent-at-best acting, some uncomfortable edits, and a plot that repeats itself over and over until it seems an ending might be necessary. At the same time, it features hilarious gory scenes right from the start, with ridiculousness and schlock around every corner." G. Noel Gross of DVD Talk rated the film four out of five stars, calling it a classic, and "One of the sickest, sleaziest movies it has been my pleasure to witness".

== See also ==
- List of American films of 1972
