= The Uh-Oh! Show =

- DVD cover
- Directed by: Herschell Gordon Lewis
- Written by: Herschell Gordon Lewis
- Produced by: Andrew Allan; Andy Lalino
- Starring: Brooke McCarter; Nevada Caldwell; Krista Grotte; Kenny DeMello; Lloyd Kaufman; Babette Bombshell; Joel D. Wynkoop
- Cinematography: Wes Pratt; Jill Sager
- Edited by: Chris Woods
- Music by: Patrick Ford
- Production companies: Film Ranch International; Lion's Kill Productions
- Release date: October 2009
- Running time: 87 minutes
- Country: United States
- Language: English

The Uh-Oh! Show is a 2009 American comedy horror splatter film, written and directed by Herschell Gordon Lewis and starring Brooke McCarter, Nevada Caldwell and Joel D. Wynkoop. The film revolves around a game show, The Uh-Oh! Show, where contestants play to win money by answering trivia questions, but appear to be dismembered for every wrong answer. A reporter suspects the gruesome attacks might not be fake.

Lewis re-named the film from its original working title of Grim Fairy Tales.

== Plot ==
Reporter Jill Burton is investigating a gruesome television game show called The Uh-Oh! Show where contestants literally "get rich or die trying". Fred Finagle is the creator of the show. While a few lucky contestants walk away with big money, most end up killed in gruesome ways. Meanwhile, Jill is suspicious about the supposedly fake deaths and becomes determined to find out if they are real or not.

== Cast ==
- Brooke McCarter as Jackie
- Nevada Caldwell as Jill Burton
- Joel D. Wynkoop as Fred Finagler
- Krista Grotte as "Champagne"
- Lauren Schmier as Marie "Coco" Smith
- Jack Amos as Dean
- Kenny Rogers as Oscar
- Bruce Blauer as Ray Hemming
- Jarrett Ricker as Richard
- Lloyd Kaufman as The Pimp
- Trish Dempsey as Old Lady Blume
- Kenny DeMello as The Puppet Killer
- Herschell Gordon Lewis as Uncle Herschell / The Narrator

== Release ==
On 26 October 2009, Lewis premiered footage for The Uh! Oh! Show at the opening night of The Spooky Movie Film Festival at the AFI Silver Theatre outside of Washington, D.C., following the 45th anniversary screening of Two Thousand Maniacs!. The film was planned to have had its world premiere at Spooky Empire's Weekend of Horror in Orlando, Florida on 11 October; however, according to Lewis's introduction to the film at the Abertoir Horror Festival in Aberystwyth, it was not yet ready. The version shown at the Abertoir festival was the premiere but still an incomplete version of the film, lacking music, titles and some special effects.

A more complete version of the film was screened at the Cinema Wasteland movie convention in Strongsville, Ohio in October 2010, with Lewis in attendance. He held a question and answer session with fans following the screening.

== Reception ==
The film won the Audience Choice Award at Texas Frightmare Weekend and Best Feature Horror Film at the Melbourne Independent Filmmakers Festival. In its review, film review site The Worldwide Celluloid Massacre describes the film as "the usual Lewis campy so-bad-its-good stuff" and reports that "the splatter is over-the-top and all in the name of silly, bad, cheaply provocative fun." Writing in the Underground Film Journal, critic Mike Everleth wrote that the film "has a strong — if loopy and nonsensical — premise" and that "none of it makes much sense, but the energy is high and although the violence is in the realm of the cartoonish, the actual effects are good and grotesque."

== Home media ==
The film was released on DVD on 30 August 2011.
