= This Stuff'll Kill Ya! =

- Directed by: Herschell Gordon Lewis
- Written by: Herschell Gordon Lewis
- Produced by: Allison Louise Downe; Herschell Gordon Lewis
- Starring: Tim Holt; Jeffrey Allen
- Cinematography: Herschell Gordon Lewis
- Edited by: Alex Ameri
- Music by: Herschell Gordon Lewis
- Production company: Ultima
- Distributed by: Ultima; Something Weird Video; Fright Video; Trans World Entertainment
- Release date: 1971
- Running time: 99 minutes
- Country: United States
- Language: English

This Stuff'll Kill Ya! is a 1971 American crime film written, produced, composed, shot and directed by Herschell Gordon Lewis, and starring Jeffrey Allen and Tim Holt in his final film appearance.

== Plot ==
A con artist acts as a preacher to run his moonshine distillery in a small town in the Deep South and clashes with a number of locals and a federal agent bent on shutting his operation down.

== Cast ==
- Jeffrey Allen as Reverend Roscoe Boone
- Tim Holt as Agent Clark
- Gloria King as Elsie
- Ray Sugar as Grady
- John David Wolf as Sam (credited as Erich Bradly)
- Terence McCarthy as Carter
- Ronna Riddle as Lynn
- Larry Drake as Bubba
- Jack Garner as Turnip (credited as John Garner)
- Bill Mays as Sheriff George
- Lee Danser as Zeke
- Pamela Polsgrove as Mary Ellen
- Doffy Candler as Beau
- Skip Nicholson as Lawyer Grimes
- Carol Merrill as Bubba's nurse
- Pamela Bloomfield as Marcia
- Debbie Gardiner as Janet
- Prentis Smithson as Agent Markel
- Bob Fisher as Glenn
- Jerry Emerson as Jerry
- Dana Demonbreun as Sandy, the tourist
- Joy Smothermon as Jane, the tourist
- Phillip Duncan
- John Griffith

== Production ==
This Stuff'll Kill Ya! was filmed in Checotah and Oklahoma City, Oklahoma.

== Critical reception ==
Film Threat described the film as "long, dull and boring" with "stilted dialogue and static direction."; critic Jeffrey Kauffman, as an "oddball entry," "patently silly," and "Uneven at best and hilariously inept at worst (in the Lewis tradition)."; and DVD Talk, as "unyielding creepiness,"; the same review stating that "[i]t also doesn't help that Allen's performance - which permeates almost every frame - is grating to no end, while the story absentmindedly stumbles around with no clear focus."

== See also ==
- List of American films of 1971

== External list ==
- This Stuff'll Kill Ya! at IMDb
