= Just for the Hell of It =

- Directed by: Herschell Gordon Lewis
- Written by: Allison Louise Downe (as Louise Downe)
- Produced by: David Chudnow; Herschell Gordon Lewis
- Starring: Ray Sager; Rodney Bedell; Agi Gyenes; Nancy Lee Noble; Steve White
- Cinematography: Roy Collodi
- Edited by: Richard Brinkman
- Music by: Larry Wellington
- Production company: Argent Film Productions
- Release date: November 6, 1968
- Running time: 81 min.
- Country: United States
- Language: English

Just for the Hell of It is a 1968 exploitation film directed by Herschell Gordon Lewis.

== Plot ==
The opening scene is set at a wild teenage party in a small apartment. The kids suddenly turn against everything around them and trash the apartment to complete annihilation. The kids are called "Destruction Incorporated", a bunch of self-imposed derelicts who terrorize a sleepy Florida town. They are led by the near-psychotic Dexter (Ray Sager), his pal Denny (Steve White), Denny's girlfriend Bitsy (Nancy Lee Noble), and their friend Lummox (Ralph Mullin). Their reason for forming this so-called "destruction crew" is as Dexter states: "just for the hell of it."

Dexter, Denny, Bitsy, and Lummox stop at a local neighborhood bar for a few drinks when the bartender becomes irritated with their shenanigans and orders them to be quiet to which they respond by beating up the owner. Afterwards, Dexter and a few of the Destruction crew pile into Dexter's 1967 white Mustang car and drive around town terrorizing and harassing the locals. One teenybopper steals a lady's newspaper and sets fire to it. A man is splashed painted when a few other youths throw paint at him. Also, a police officer is contemptuously taunted.

At a corner coffee shop, the overly zealous teens engage in a bloody fist fight with another teenager, named Doug (Rodney Bedelle), who used to know Dexter and was part of his gang before walking away years ago. As result of the rumble, the group begins to trash the place. The proprietor threatens to call the police, but is cut short when one of the teenyboppers punches him in the face. Dexter and Denny, aided by other Destruction crew, cruelly drag the owner to the stove and they unmercifully burn his hands on the hot stove.

Soon, newspapers decry the terrible savagery besieging the town, and the police proceed to track down and arrest Dexter and some of his crew. But under interrogation, the sociopath Dexter calmly denies anything to do with the violence sweeping the community. With no witnesses willing to come forward on fear of retribution from the Destruction crew, and with circumstantial evidence to hold him on, the police release Dexter, only giving him a warning to keep out of trouble.

Soon, the delinquents run afoul of law and order again; a blind man is ruthlessly tormented; a newly bandaged man is beaten with his own crutches; a throng of the cretins snatch a woman's baby and stash it in a garbage can, before they demolish the baby stroller, all in front of the mortified mother. Employees of a business office are harassed to a point of terrorism, and a local cafeteria is raided. An off-duty police officer is beaten, while a female homemaker is attacked while innocently laundering clothes. Desiring to slight no segment of society, a group of the Destruction crew invade a little league baseball game. A brawling free-for-all is interrupted by Doug, who witnesses the antics and intervenes, beating up a few of the crew, before he gets overwhelmed. A confused and senile old woman sees the rumble and calls the police, but the gang flees, and Doug unbelievably gets arrested for fighting with the boys.

While Doug is temporally in jail, four of the gang drive down a road near the beach and discover a teenage couple making out on a beach blanket. The four teenyboppers attack and beat up the boy, while the young woman is gang raped and afterwards, both her and her boyfriend are bludgeoned to death by the sadistic youths who withdraw from the scene of the crime. Later, during a party the Destruction crew throws at their hideout, Dexter catches four high school girls who stumble into the party, and the group proceeds to strip and humiliate the teen girls before throwing them out of the party.

The next day, Doug is bailed out of jail by his girlfriend, Jeanne (Agi Gyenes) whom they both try to stop the gang on their own since the police are unwilling to do anything. Dexter and his group meet with Doug where they tell him to stay out of their way, but Doug refuses to be bullied. With Doug unwilling to back down, Dexter decides to get back at his former friend.

One evening, Bitsy phones Doug and lures him away from his house to meet with him on the ruse that she wants to help turn the gang she it in whom treat her like their mascot, Doug goes... leaving Jeanne alone in the house. Dexter, Denny and the Destruction crew arrive at Doug's house shortly thereafter where they stage a home invasion in which they taunt, strip and severely beat and mutilate Jeanne before leaving her for dead. When Doug realizes that Bitsy has no intention of testifying against Dexter and the Destruction crew, Doug flees back to his house only to find Jeanne hideously bruised, bleeding, and maimed... with the image of a rat carved into her stomach.

Driven by revenge, Doug sets out back to the Destruction crew's hideout to confront them. Most of the group flees in Dexter's Mustang while Denny and Bitsy escape on a motorcycle. Doug gives chase with them racing through the streets of the town. Soon, the police intervene in the chase, which ends when Denny and Bitsy accidentally slide off the road at a curve and hit a telephone pole which the motorcycle explodes. Denny and Bitsy are thrown off the motorbike, and are both killed by the impact.

The final shot shows that Dexter has somehow escaped from the police and meeting with Lummox who gives him an update on Denny and Bitsy's deaths as well as several members of the crew in jail. Indifferent, Dexter responds with: "who cares, man?"

The film closes with the caption: "THE END... of this movie, but not the violence".

== Cast ==
- Ray Sager as Dexter
- Rodney Bedell as Doug
- Agi Gyenes as Jeanne
- Nancy Lee Noble as Bitsy
- Steve White as Denny
- Ralph Mullin as Lummox
- Larry Williams as Cransy
- Geraldine Young as the lead teenybopper
- A.V. Dreeson Sr. as the Police Chief
- A.V. Dreeson as Lt. Sanders
- Paul Jensen as the diner owner

== Critical reception ==
Allmovie wrote: "Just for the Hell of It has more to offer fans of Lewis' well-known gore films than his other genre deviations, though it's unlikely that many other viewers would be amused."
