= William Kerwin =

American actor and filmmaker (1927–1989)

- Born: April 17, 1927; San Diego, California, U.S.
- Died: October 27, 1989 (aged 62); Hollywood, Florida, U.S.
- Other names: Thomas Sweetwood; Thomas Wood; Rooney Kerwin
- Spouses: Hanna Hertelendy (m. 1953; div. 1958) Connie Mason (m. 1964)
- Children: 3

William Kerwin (April 17, 1927 – October 27, 1989) was an American actor and filmmaker, best known for his character roles in the films of Herschell Gordon Lewis.

== Career ==
Kerwin enjoyed some success on the stage and screen before being discovered by Herschell Gordon Lewis through the promotional short Carving Magic. His first feature film with Lewis was Living Venus, and he went on to star in some of the director’s best known works such as Blood Feast. In addition to playing principal roles, Kerwin served variously as the assistant director, makeup technician, gaffer, key grip and prop man for Lewis’ films. Kerwin was thus often involved in creating the gory practical effects that would become Lewis’ trademark.

Whether working with Lewis or other directors, Kerwin was closely associated with exploitation films. In particular, he was known for work in nudist films and splatter films.

Throughout his career, Kerwin often performed under pseudonyms such as Thomas Wood in order to appear in non-union productions. He was registered with the Screen Actors Guild under his real name of Willam Kerwin.

== Personal life ==
Kerwin’s first marriage was to actress Hanna Hertelendy from 1953 to 1958. Kerwin had one daughter from his marriage to Hertelendy, costume designer Barbara Kerwin.

In 1964, Kerwin married Connie Mason, who he met while filming Blood Feast. The couple had two daughters, Denise and Kim, and remained married until Kerwin's death in 1989.

Kerwin was the brother of director Harry Kerwin and appeared in several of his films throughout the 1970s including God's Bloody Acre, Barracuda and Tomcats.

All three of Kerwin’s daughters pursued film careers for at least a decade. Half-sisters Barbara and Kim Kerwin had bit roles in Herschell Gordon Lewis’ The Gruesome Twosome as children; William Kerwin himself did not appear in this movie. Both girls also collaborated with their uncle Harry Kerwin; Barbara had a small role in Sweet Bird of Aquarius while Kim acted in Cheering Section. Denise, William Kerwin’s youngest daughter, is the only of the three to never work with Lewis or Harry Kerwin during her acting career.

A heavy drinker and smoker both on and off-camera throughout his life, Kerwin died from a heart attack on October 27, 1989 at his home in Hollywood, Florida at age 62.

== Filmography ==
=== Film ===
Year	Title	Role	Notes	Ref.
1959	Carving Magic	Joe	Short promotional film sponsored by Swift & Company.	
1961	Living Venus	Jack	While his character is credited as Jack, he is referred to throughout the movie as John V. Norwall	
1961	The Long Rope	Steve Matthews		
1963	Blood Feast	Detective Pete Thornton	Credited as Thomas Wood	
1963	Goldilocks and the Three Bares	Tommy Sweetwood	Credited as Tommy Sweetwood	
1964	Two Thousand Maniacs!	Tom White	Credited as Thomas Wood	
1967	A Taste of Blood	Dr. Hank Tyson	Credited as Thomas Wood	
1967	Playgirl Killer	Bill	Also known as Decoy for Terror	
1968	Suburban Roulette	Marty Conley		
1969	Childish Things	Mr. Sullivan		
1970	The Naked Zoo	Policeman		
1971	Sometimes Aunt Martha Does Dreadful Things	Lead Detective	Credited as Thomas Wood	
1973	House of Terror	Russell Donovan	Uncredited	
1973	The Godmothers	Speedboat Owner		
1974	Impulse	Soldier		
1976	No Way Back	Goon #4		
1977	Tomcats	Detective Tom Garrett	Credited as Thomas Dowling	
1978	Barracuda	Sheriff Ben Williams		
1981	Absence of Malice	Walker	Credited as Rooney Kerwin	
1985	The Heavenly Kid	Suburbaner	Credited as Rooney Kerwin	

=== Television ===
Year	Title	Role	Notes	Ref.
1958	The Adventures of Wild Bill Hickok	Tom	5 episodes	
1982	Romance Theatre	Jacob	5 episodes	
1985	Miami Vice	Paul	1 episode	
