= A Taste of Blood =

- Theatrical film poster
- Directed by: Herschell Gordon Lewis
- Written by: Donald Stanford
- Produced by: Herschell Gordon Lewis
- Starring: Bill Rogers; Elizabeth Wilkinson; William Kerwin (as Thomas Wood)
- Cinematography: Andy Romanoff
- Edited by: Richard Brinkman
- Music by: Larry Wellington
- Distributed by: Creative Film Enterprises Inc.
- Release date: August 9, 1967
- Running time: 117 minutes
- Country: United States
- Language: English
- Budget: $65,000 (estimated)

A Taste of Blood is a 1967 American horror film, produced and directed by Herschell Gordon Lewis. It stars, among others, Bill Rogers and Elizabeth Wilkinson. The film was also known as The Secret of Dr. Alucard. Lewis considered it his masterpiece.

== Plot ==
A Miami businessman, John Stone, receives a parcel from England containing two old bottles of Slivovitz brandy from his recently deceased ancestor, and after drinking both bottles, becomes a vampire. Stone uses his newfound vampire powers to keep his wife, Helene, in a trance as he travels to England to kill the descendants of Abraham Van Helsing that murdered Count Dracula. Meanwhile, Helsing's distant relative, Howard Helsing, pursues Stone with the intent to put the reborn vampire to rest for good.

== Cast ==
- Bill Rogers as John Stone
- Elizabeth Wilkinson as Helene Stone
- William Kerwin as Dr. Hank Tyson (credited as Thomas Wood)
- Lawrence Tobim as Det. Crane
- Ted Schell as Lord Gold
- Otto Schlessinger as Dr. Howard Helsing
- Eleanor Vaill as Hester Avery
- Gail Janis as Vivian
- Herschell Gordon Lewis as the Limey seaman and voice of Baron Khron (credited as Seymour Sheldon)
- Judy Waterberry as Ida, the maid
- Dolores Carlos as Sherri Morris
- Roy Collodi as delivery man
- Karl Stoeber as man walking dog
- Thomas Rowland as detective
- Sidney J. Reich as Arthur Morris (credited as Sidney Jaye)
- Barrie Walton as telephone operator
- Cal Bowman as Hank's golfing friend
- Doug Weston as police photographer
- Jake R. Pawlson as policeman
- Bill Kozak as man running from tomb
