= The Wizard of Gore =

1970 American splatter film directed by Herschell Gordon Lewis

- Original release poster
- Directed by: Herschell Gordon Lewis
- Written by: Allen Kahn
- Produced by: Herschell Gordon Lewis
- Starring: Ray Sager; Judy Cler; Wayne Ratay
- Cinematography: Alex Ameri; Daniel Krogh
- Edited by: Eskandar Ameripoor
- Music by: Larry Wellington
- Distributed by: Mayflower Pictures
- Release date: October 23, 1970
- Running time: 95 minutes
- Country: United States
- Language: English
- Budget: $60,000 (est)

The Wizard of Gore is a 1970 American splatter film directed by Herschell Gordon Lewis and starring Ray Sager, Judy Cler, and Wayne Ratay. The screenplay was written by Allen Kahn.

== Plot ==
Magician Montag the Magnificent delivers speeches about the nature of reality to his audience and then performs mutilation tricks on female "volunteers". The women appear unharmed immediately afterward but later collapse, dead, in public or at home—mutilated in the same grisly fashion suggested by Montag's stage tricks. Audience member Sherry Carson, a local TV talk show hostess, and her boyfriend Jack begin to suspect that Montag is somehow involved in the murders. Jack and fellow reporter Greg attempt to research the case but are unable to come up with any solid evidence.

Montag agrees to appear on Sherry's show to perform a fire trick; when the cameras roll, he hypnotizes not only everyone in the studio, but also the viewing audience at home. With a wave of his hand, Montag starts a fire and is guiding Sherry and two plainclothes cops toward it when Jack intervenes and pushes Montag into the fire instead, killing him instantly.

Back at home, Sherry and Jack have a drink as they discuss their strange experience. Suddenly, Jack laughs and begins peeling his own skin from his face to reveal that he is actually Montag. He disembowels her with his bare hands, yet Sherry still alive and laughing maniacally, tells Montag that none of what has happened was real—and that even he is part of her illusion.

Montag is then teleported back onstage, dazed, reciting the same speech that he delivered to his audience at the beginning of the film. An unimpressed Sherry turns to Jack, muttering, "You know what I think? I think he's a phony."

== Cast ==
- Ray Sager as Montag the Magnificent
- Judy Cler as Sherry Carson
- Wayne Ratay as Jack
- Phil Laurenson as Greg
- Jim Rau as Steve
- Don Alexander as Detective Kramer
- John Elliot as Detective Harlan

== Production ==
Principal photography took place in 1969 and lasted two weeks. According to Lewis, the initial actor cast as Montag the Magnificent walked off the set following a confrontation with Lewis collaborator Fred Sandy. Crew member Ray Sager assumed the starring role.

A. Louise Downe aided Lewis in special effects design as she had on Blood Feast. Lewis' son Robert assisted in the execution of the gore effects because of his willingness to handle animal viscera. In The Amazing Herschell Gordon Lewis, Daniel Krogh notes that the film's graphic gore effects were accomplished with two sheep carcasses. The carcasses, which had to be carried around for more than two weeks while the film was being shot, were soaked in Pine-Sol. Krogh also describes how the chainsaw sequence was filmed: two women, one whose upper body was exposed and another whose legs were exposed, played the single victim. A fake midsection filled with animal organs, mortician's wax and condoms full of stage blood was placed between the two women. According to Allmovie, the film's special effects were compromised "due to rushed schedules, budgetary limitations, and unforeseen accidents on the set", and Lewis claimed to be unhappy with the final product.

== Critical reception ==
Allmovie called the film "arguably the most interesting product from cinematic gorehound Herschell Gordon Lewis", though a "standard Lewis collection of non-actors and clumsy cinematography, and it isn't unlikely that the script's elliptical qualities are due more to the hasty plugging of plot holes than any grand design." TV Guide criticized the acting (particularly Sager) and cinematography, though concluded “Lewis fans will no doubt love it”.

== Remake ==
The film was remade in 2007, starring Crispin Glover as Montag the Magnificent.

== In popular culture ==
The film was notably referenced and a scene is shown in the 2007 film Juno.

== See also ==
- List of American films of 1970
