= Something Weird (film) =

- Directed by: Herschell Gordon Lewis
- Written by: James F. Hurley
- Produced by: James F. Hurley; Fred M. Sandy
- Starring: Tony McCabe; 9Elizabeth Lee: William Brooker
- Cinematography: Andy Romanoff
- Edited by: Richard Brinkman
- Music by: Edward J. Petan
- Production company: Hur-Lew Productions
- Distributed by: Mayflower Pictures (theatrical); Something Weird Video (home video)
- Release dates: August 1967 (Chicago); March 27, 1968 (re-release)
- Running time: 80 min.
- Country: United States
- Language: English
- Budget: $35,000 (estimated)

Something Weird (also known as The Eerie World of Dr. Jordan) is a 1967 American exploitation film directed by Herschell Gordon Lewis and starring Tony McCabe and Elizabeth Lee. It features a paranormal plot involving LSD drug use, a psychic, a hideous witch who morphs into a young woman, a séance, a kung-fu chopping socialite, ghosts, psychopaths and federal agents.

The film played on a double bill with another 1967 film by the same director, The Gruesome Twosome.

== Plot ==
Cronin Mitchell survives a horrible electrical accident when a maintenance man falls from an electrical power line pole, and accidentally releases the power line he was attempting to attach. Mitchell attempts to help the man, but the electrical line thrusts into his face. An ambulance arrives, where the paramedics discover that the maintenance man is dead, but that Mitchell is still alive, but in horrible pain. They place him on a stretcher and take him away in the ambulance.

In the next scene, Mitchell tosses and turns frantically in his hospital bed. Two doctors, named Dr. Roxin and Dr. White, examine him and it is discovered that Cronin Mitchell, due to this near-fatal electrical charge through his brain, has somehow given him Extra Sensory Perception. The two medical colleagues discuss Mitchell's horribly disfigured face and his apparent lack of will to live. Dr. Roxin convinces Dr. White, that ESP is real due to a series of ESP test cards.

After the disfigured Mitchell sexually harasses a local nurse who tends to him, she rebuffs his advances because of his scarred face. After leaving the hospital, Mitchell retreats from the public and dons a black scarf and dark sunglasses to hide his appearance. Having lost his job and everything else, he begins giving private psychic readings out of his house for cheap prices. During a reading, a book titled 'Bible of the Witches' magically appears in his hands. Almost at once, an ugly hag of a woman enters and questions him about his psychic powers. Revealed to be a witch, the ugly hag makes Mitchell a proposition: in return for using her magic powers to restore his face to as it once was, Mitchell must agree to be her lover. Mitchell agrees and his face is instantly returned to its normal state, and the hag disappears.

Mitchell leaves his house for the first time in months since his accident and begins to explore his renewed and enhanced life. In a dive bar, Mitchell encounters the beautiful Ellen Parker. But to his curiosity, Mitchell cannot read Ellen's mind. They retire to her apartment for some alone make-out time. Suddenly without warning, Ellen transforms into the ugly hag and reveals herself, and orders him to keep his end of their deal. Mitchell very reluctantly submits to his slave status with this ugly witch.

Circumstances change when he attempts to use his psychic abilities to identify a serial killer who is committing murders in the small town of Jefferson, Wisconsin, and runs head-to-head into a karate-happy government official, Alex Jordan, who has been sent by the federal government to work on the case. Detective Maddox of the Jefferson police force meets with Dr. Jordan and takes him to see Mitchell and his assistant Ellen, who is now accompanying Mitchell wherever he goes. Jordan is immediately smitten by the beautiful Ellen, but only Mitchell still sees her as an old hag whereas everyone else sees Ellen as a beautiful young woman. During the meeting to help find the elusive killer, Dr. Jordan produces a small container from his coat pocket and explains that it contains the hallucinogenic drug LSD. He advises Mitchell to take the drug and to meet with him the next day. Mitchell explains that he has no experience with the drug, but that he will, under the circumstances, do as he is asked.

At a party, Mitchell is asked to demonstrate his extraordinary powers. He does so by levitating a chair to the amazement of the onlookers. Next, Mitchell visits a church where he summons a ghost that has mysteriously laid claim to the unfortunate house of worship. The apparition appears, touches Mitchell and leaves. Mitchell states to the priest of the church that the ghost will not return for "she" only needed contact with humankind.

Meanwhile, Jordan is pursuing Ellen to seduce her, but she rebuffs all his advances by claiming that she belongs to Mitchell and he is her one and only lover. Ellen further explains that she and Mitchell are meant to be together until death. Jordan then attacks her in a moment of misogynist rage, but she fights him off. In an act of revenge, Ellen tells Mitchell what happened and insists that he kill Dr. Jordan before he can try to force himself on her again. But Mitchell refuses to kill Jordan by conventional means and decides an alternative. During one evening, Jordan retires to his hotel room bed alone and in a truly bizarre scene, is beset by his blue bed sheets. However, Jordan resorts to ripping the living blankets and escapes unscathed.

At the climax, Mitchell finally takes the LSD and during his "trip" he discovers that Detective Maddox is the serial killer. Somehow, Mitchell also surmises that the murderous and corrupt police detective intents to shoot him. Maddox does appear to kill Mitchell and shoots him right between the eyes. Jordan and the police arrive too late to help, but kill Maddox. Despite Mitchell being dead, the case is solved with Dr. Jordan taking all the credit for finding the killer, which he decides to make the move onto Ellen.

In the final scene, Jordan is with Ellen in his parked car making the moves on her. Ellen responds to his advances by kissing him in return. But just like with Mitchell earlier, she suddenly transforms into the ugly witch hag. In horror, Jordan runs out of the car and flees from the grotesque Ellen/Hag. Jordon unwittingly runs head-on into a fire flare at an excavation site and falls to the ground with part of his face horribly burned. The hag approaches him and offers to heal his injuries and restore his scared face with magic if he agrees to become her lover. Jordan agrees... and the vicious cycle is to continue all over again.

== Cast ==
- Tony McCabe as Cronin Mitchell
- Elizabeth Lee as Ellen Parker
- William Brooker as Alex Jordan
- Mudite Arums as the hag
- Ted Heil as Detective Maddox
- Lawrence J. Aberwood as Chief Vinton (credited as Lawrence Wood)
- Larry Wellington as Reverend Ammond
- Jeffrey Allen as Dr. White
- Roy Collodi as Dr. Roxin
- Norm Lenet as Stein
- Carolyn Smith as Nurse Browning
- Ione Rolnick as banker's wife (credited as Ione)
- Richard Nilsson as EMT
- Janet Charlton as secretary
- Kathleen Koenig as the ghost (credited as Kathy Koenig)
- George Cohon as banker
- Herschell Gordon Lewis as the narrator (credited as Sheldon Seymour)
- Peggy Stewart as Vinton's wife (credited as Peg Stewart)
- Stan Dale as government official
- Vickie Wolfe as murder victim
- Richard Donning as Jordan's karate partner
- Janet Granata as Kim

== Reception ==
Peter Laws wrote in Fortean Times: "Something Weird is a bizarre delight that really earns its title."

== See also ==
- List of American films of 1967
