= The Gruesome Twosome (1967 film) =

- Theatrical film poster
- Directed by: Herschell Gordon Lewis
- Written by: Allison Louise Downe (as Louise Downe)
- Produced by: Herschell Gordon Lewis; J.G. Patterson Jr. Fred M. Sandy
- Starring: Elizabeth Davis; Gretchen Wells; Chris Martell
- Cinematography: Roy Collodi
- Edited by: George Regas
- Music by: Larry Wellington
- Release date: 1967
- Running time: 72 min.
- Country: United States
- Language: English
- Budget: $40,000 (estimated)

The Gruesome Twosome is a 1967 American splatter comedy film, produced and directed by Herschell Gordon Lewis. The film played on a double bill with another 1967 film by the same director, Something Weird.

== Synopsis ==
Mrs. Pringle (Elizabeth Davis) owns a wig shop in a little town in Florida, but she is a demented woman who lives with her mentally disabled son, Rodney (Chris Martell), in a home where she rents rooms to young women attending the local university.

Students are disappearing; they are killed and scalped by a mysterious murderer. When Kathy, a student attending the university nearby, tries to figure out who is killing her classmates, the police discover the terrible truth about the fate of the young victims. And the truth, of course, involves Mrs. Pringle and her son.

== Cast ==
- Elizabeth Davis as Mrs. Pringle
- Gretchen Wells as Kathy Baker
- Chris Martell as Rodney Pringle
- Rodney Bedell as Dave Hall
- Ronnie Cass as Nancy Harris
- Karl Stoeber as Mr. Spinsen
- Dianne Wilhite as Janet
- Andrea Barr as Susan
- Dianne Raymond as Dawn Farrell
- Sherry Robinson as Lisa
- Barrie Walton as Neighbor Lady
- Marcelle Bichette as Jane
- Tom Brent as Neighbor Man
- Mike Todd as Mike

== See also ==
- List of American films of 1967
