= David F. Friedman =

American filmmaker (1923–2011)

- Born: David Frank Friedman; December 24, 1923; Birmingham, Alabama, U.S.
- Died: February 14, 2011 (aged 87); Anniston, Alabama, U.S.
- Occupation(s): Director, producer
- Years active: 1954–2010

David Frank Friedman (December 24, 1923 – February 14, 2011) was an American filmmaker and film producer best known for his B movies, exploitation films, nudie cuties, and sexploitation films.

== Life and career ==
Friedman first became interested in entertainment after spending part of his childhood in Birmingham and Anniston, Alabama, traveling carnival sites. He worked as a film projectionist in Buffalo before serving in the US Army during the Second World War.

He met exploitation film pioneer Kroger Babb during his army service. This encounter got him interested in films. He then worked as a regional marketing man for Paramount, and sensed the money in independent distributing.

He started his own company in the 1950s, which mainly produced so-called nudie cutie films such as Goldilocks and The Three Bares, shot in nudist colonies, films that were the closest thing to pornography legally available at the time. This trend was followed by the sexploitation and "roughie" genres, depicting simulated sex with a more violent edge, often horror- or crime-related. Examples of Friedman's roughies are The Defilers (1965), The Lustful Turk (1968), The Head Mistress (1968) and The Adult Version of Jekyll and Hide (1971, directed by Byron Mabe). Helming one of those movies, Friedman started his working relationship with Chicago-based teacher and filmmaker Herschell Gordon Lewis.

Friedman went on to produce the latter's 1963 film Blood Feast, an American exploitation film often considered the first "gore" or splatter film. He was also the producer of two of the first Nazi exploitation films, Love Camp 7 (1969) and Ilsa: She-Wolf of the SS (1974), for which he wouldn't use his real name and was credited as Herman Traeger.

With the advent of hardcore porn as a commercial factor in the mid-1970s, Friedman began to slow down his output. His motto was "Sell the sizzle not the steak" and he would not allow actual intercourse to be shown in his films. Still, he was president of the Adult Film Association of America, a trade association for hardcore porn producers.

In the early 1990s Seattle's Something Weird Video, owned by Mike Vraney, started to re-issue much of Friedman's work on videocassette, getting him the attention of a new generation of exploitation and b-movie collectors. He can be heard on the audio commentary track of some of the company's releases. In 1997, Friedman appeared in a lengthy segment of the feature-length documentary Hollywood Rated "R" and in the half-hour documentary David Friedman, Portrait of an Exploiteer, in the both of which he goes over his entire career and the history of exploitation films in America. In 2000 Friedman was featured alongside cult filmmakers Roger Corman, Doris Wishman, Harry Novak and others in the documentary SCHLOCK! The Secret History of American Movies, a film about the rise and fall of American exploitation cinema.

In 1990 Friedman published his autobiography, A Youth in Babylon: Confessions of a Trash-Film King. He remained proud of his cinematic oeuvre: “I made some terrible pictures, but I don’t make any apologies for anything I’ve ever done. Nobody ever asked for their money back.”

In 2001 he co-starred with longtime business partner Dan Sonney in the documentary Mau Mau Sex Sex (IMDb entry).

Friedman died of heart failure in Anniston, Alabama on February 14, 2011, at the age of 87.
