= Something Weird Video =

American film distributor company based in Seattle, Washington

- Type: Private
- Industry: Film
- Genre: Exploitation
- Founded: 1990
- Founder: Mike Vraney
- Headquarters: Seattle, Washington, United States
- Area served: Worldwide
- Products: VHS, DVD, Blu-ray Disc
- Services: Film distribution
- Website: www.somethingweird.com

Something Weird Video is an American film distributor company based in Seattle, Washington. They specialize in exploitation B to Z films, particularly the works of Harry Novak, Doris Wishman, David F. Friedman and Herschell Gordon Lewis.

== Inspiration ==
The company is named after Lewis' 1967 film Something Weird, and the logo is taken from that film's original poster art.

== History ==
Something Weird Video was founded in 1990 by Mike Vraney in Seattle. He was inspired by his teenage job as a theater projectionist. His love for the obscure films that never made it to video prompted him to transfer hundreds of ancient reels of film to VHS videotape and DVD. On the company website, Vraney explains the label's genesis:

In my mind, the last great genre to be scavenged were the exploitation / sexploitation films of the 1920s through the 1970s. After looking into this further, I realized that there were nearly 2,000 movies out there yet to be discovered. So with this for inspiration, my quest began and wouldn't you know, just out of the blue I fell into a large collection of 16 mm girlie arcade loops (which became the first compilation videos we put together). Around the same time I received an unexpected phone call that suddenly made all this real: my future and hands-down the king of sexploitation Dave Friedman was on the other end of the line. This would be the beginning of a long and fruitful friendship for both of us. Dave's films became the building blocks for our film collection and he has taught and guided me through the wonderful world of sexploitation, introducing me to his colleagues (Dan Sonney, Harry Novak, H. G. Lewis, Bob Cresse and all the other colorful characters who were involved during his heyday) and they've been eager to dive into the business again.

On January 2, 2014, Vraney died of lung cancer. The company continued for awhile under the leadership of Vraney's widow, Lisa Petrucci. But at the end of 2024, Something Weird Video shut down indefinitely due to financial and logistical reasons.

== Content ==
The content offered by Something Weird runs the gamut of exploitation cinema. Subgenres offered include films centering on burlesque and striptease shows, nudist exposes and features, drug and driver's education shorts, stag and peepshow loops, softcore and hardcore shorts and features, horror, particularly splatter films, sword-and-sandal spectaculars, spaghetti westerns, trailer compilations such as the Dusk to Dawn Drive-In Trash-O-Rama Show, TV rarities, jungle films and films featuring all-black casts.

Something Weird initially offered their product on VHS with colorful covers using the original film artwork. In 1999 they made the transition to DVD, partnering with Image Entertainment to release their titles.

Something Weird's videos are available on demand to Comcast subscribers. Among the series of titles within their library are Kid's Commercials from the Golden Age of Television, Hey Folks It's Intermission Time and Campy Classroom Classics. There are also several titles available for streaming on Netflix.

Something Weird also offers a line called Sexy Shockers. These films are selected by cult film director Frank Henenlotter.

Distributors of Something Weird titles include Odeon Entertainment in the U.K. and Siren Visual Entertainment in Australia.

== Select releases ==
Something Weird has issued some very notable films, including:

- Basket Case
- Blood Feast
- The Wizard of Gore
- Jail Bait
- Teaserama
- Murder a la Mod
- Wild Guitar
- The Violent Years
- The Wild Women of Wongo
- Teen-Age Strangler
- The Horrors of Spider Island
- The Atomic Brain (aka Monstrosity)
- The Magic Christmas Tree
- Santa Claus Conquers the Martians

== See also ==
- The Criterion Collection
- Shout Factory
- Mystery Science Theater 3000
