= Social Capital Entertainment =

Social Capital Entertainment is an American film production company involved in film, music and interactive entertainment. The company was founded in 2004 by producer and real estate investor Martin Shore together with Jonathan Platt and Jonathan Miller.

Social Capital produced and financed the psychological thriller, Tell-Tale, together with Ridley Scott and Tony Scott. Tell-Tale starred Josh Lucas, Lena Heady and Brian Cox, and was directed by Michael Cuesta (L.I.E., Dexter). In 2010 they released 2001 Maniacs: Field of Screams, the sequel to 2001 Maniacs, the 2005 Social Capital horror film.

Other films include the period drama The Countess (Julie Delpy's follow-up to 2 Days in Paris) and Snoop Dogg's Hood of Horror (Lionsgate). The company has also produced soundtracks for such films as Saw (Lionsgate), Saw II (Lionsgate), Rize (Lionsgate) and Rock School (Newmarket), as well as for television series including Summerland.

== See also ==
- Social Capital Films — subsidiary.
