= Carol Sutton (actress) =

American actress (1944–2020)

- Born: Carol Dickerson; December 3, 1944; New Orleans, Louisiana, U.S.
- Died: December 10, 2020 (aged 76); New Orleans, Louisiana, U.S.
- Resting place: Mount Olivet Cemetery
- Occupation: Actress
- Years active: 1974–2020
- Spouse: Archie Sutton (divorced)
- Children: 2
- Relatives: Oris Buckner III; brother

Carol Joan Sutton (née Dickerson; December 3, 1944 – December 10, 2020) was an American actress of theater, film and television. She was best known for her appearances in the films Steel Magnolias, Monster's Ball, and Ray.

== Biography ==
Carol Dickerson was born in New Orleans, Louisiana. She attended the Xavier University Preparatory School and later enrolled at Xavier University of Louisiana, but dropped out of the latter after marrying Archie Sutton, whom she later divorced. She worked for Total Community Action and earned certification in early childhood development from Texas Southern University in Houston. She was also a parishioner at St Francis de Sales Catholic Church in New Orleans. Her brother Oris Buckner III was a New Orleans homicide detective who revealed widespread corruption and racism in the New Orleans police department.

Sutton died from complications of COVID-19 on December 10, 2020, seven days after her 76th birthday, amidst the COVID-19 pandemic in New Orleans. She is interred at Mount Olivet Cemetery in New Orleans, Louisiana. The sixth episode of the second season of Outer Banks, titled "My Druthers", in which she appeared, is dedicated to her memory.

== Acting career ==
She joined the Dashiki Project Theatre in the 1960s. Her acting debut came in the 1974 television film The Autobiography of Miss Jane Pittman.

Sutton devoted much of her career to the theater and also served as an acting teacher in her hometown. She played many supporting roles in American film and television, appearing in productions such as The Pelican Brief, Candyman: Farewell to the Flesh, American Horror Story: Coven, True Detective, Kidnap, The Last Exorcism, Outer Banks and Killer Joe.

In 2012, Sutton received a New Orleans Lifetime Achievement Award.

In 2019, Sutton played Lena Younger in A Raisin in the Sun by Lorraine Hansberry.

== Filmography ==
=== Film and television ===
- 1974: The Autobiography of Miss Jane Pittman (TV Movie) as Vivian
- 1976: Sounder, Part 2
- 1976: Abejas asesinas (TV Movie) as Mrs. Compher
- 1977: Minstrel Man (TV Movie) as Tess
- 1978: Mirrors as Perfume Lady
- 1982: Cane River as Ms. Mathis
- 1984: Gimme a Break! (TV Series) as Stewardess (uncredited)
- 1986: The Big Easy as Judge
- 1987: A Gathering of Old Men (TV Movie) as Janey
- 1987: Uncle Tom's Cabin (TV Movie) as Lucy
- 1988: In the Heat of the Night (TV Series) as Macie Jones / Lucille Jeffson
- 1989: The Outside Woman (TV Movie) as Female Security Officer
- 1989: Steel Magnolias as Nurse Pam
- 1991: This Gun for Hire (TV Movie) as Guard
- 1991: Doublecrossed (TV Movie) as Bailiff #1
- 1991: Convicts as Lena
- 1993: The Fire Next Time (TV Mini Series) as Estelle
- 1993: The Pelican Brief as New Orleans Policewoman
- 1994: Heart of Stone as Judge
- 1995: Jake Lassiter: Justice on the Bayou (TV Movie) as Judge Hamill
- 1995: Candyman: Farewell to the Flesh as Angry Woman at Matthew's House
- 1996: The Big Easy (TV Series) as Judge
- 1997: Orleans (TV Series) as Mary
- 1997: Eve's Bayou as Madame Renard
- 1998: Rag and Bone (TV Movie) as Etta Parker
- 1999: A Lesson Before Dying (TV Movie) as Thelma
- 2001: Tempted as Steffie, LeBlanc's Maid
- 2001: Going to California (TV Series) as Gloria Stevens
- 2001: El pasado nos condena as Ms. Guillermo
- 2002: The Badge as Pharmacy Lady
- 2003: Runaway Jury as Lou Dell
- 2004: A Love Song for Bobby Long as Ruthie
- 2004: Ray as Eula
- 2004: The Dead Will Tell (TV Movie) as Bakery Owner
- 2004: The Madam's Family: The Truth About the Canal Street Brothel (TV Movie) as Ms. Aguillard
- 2004: Searching for David's Heart (TV Movie) as Records Administrator
- 2006: Glory Road as Old Woman - Cole Field House
- 2006: Deja Vu as Eyewitness / Survivor
- 2006: Nola as Bernice
- 2007: Quincy & Althea (Short) as Althea
- 2007: Flakes as Miss Lucille
- 2007: Pride as Ophelia (Andre's Mother)
- 2007: The Staircase Murders (TV Movie) as Jury Forewoman
- 2008: Welcome Home Roscoe Jenkins as Ms. Pearl
- 2008: American Violet as Charlise Leray
- 2008: Abduction of Jesse Bookman as Voodoo Lady
- 2008: The Loss of a Teardrop Diamond as Susie
- 2008: Front of the Class (TV Movie) as Admission Clerk
- 2009: Dixon's Girl (Short) as Clora
- 2009: In the Absence of Saints (Short) as Evelyn / Mother
- 2010: Father of Invention as Bingo Caller
- 2010: Beauty & the Briefcase (TV Movie) as Recruiter
- 2010: Treme (TV Series) as Melba
- 2010: The Last Exorcism as Shopkeeper
- 2010: Knucklehead as Woman on Bus
- 2011: Love, Wedding, Marriage as Matchmaker
- 2011: The Help as Cora
- 2011: Killer Joe as Saleslady
- 2011: Inside Out as Ancient Lady
- 2011: Jeff, Who Lives at Home as Elderly Woman
- 2012: Comando Especial as Hamilton Principal
- 2013: Robosapien: Rebooted as Mrs. Jacobs
- 2013: Red Bean Monday (Short) as Sally
- 2013: This Is the End as Cashier
- 2013: From the Rough as Esther Samsen
- 2013: White Rabbit as Librarian
- 2013: Oldboy as Vera
- 2013: American Horror Story: Coven (TV Series) as Black Woman
- 2014: True Detective (TV Series) as Miss Delores
- 2014: Elsa y Fred as Grocery Clerk
- 2014: Dawn of the Planet of the Apes as Old Woman
- 2014: American Heist as Hostage Woman
- 2014: Catch Hell as Delores
- 2014: The Masters of Suspense (Les Maîtres du suspense) as La Mambo
- 2015: Socialwerk (Short) as Miss Betty
- 2015: Bad Asses on the Bayou as Lois Morgan
- 2015: Hot Pursuit as Brenda
- 2015: N.O.L.A Circus as Psychiatrist
- 2015: Forgive and Forget as Catherine
- 2015: Scream Queens as Jury Foreman
- 2016: Confirmation (TV Movie) as Erma Hill
- 2016: Showing Roots as Rosadel
- 2016: Cold Moon as Nina
- 2016: Roots (TV Mini Series) as Miss Malizy
- 2016: Hidden America with Jonah Ray (TV Series) as Vanessa Watkins
- 2016: Abattoir as Muriel
- 2016: Scream (TV Series) as Drug Store Clerk
- 2016: Wild Oats as Mourner #4
- 2016: Plaquemines (Short) as Gam
- 2017: Camera Obscura as Dr. Vogel
- 2017: Kidnap as Nearby Woman #2
- 2017: Claws (TV Series) as Female Senior #1
- 2017: Things with Feathers (Short) as GoGo
- 2017: Sex Guaranteed as Old Lady
- 2017: Trailer Park Boys: Out of the Park (TV Series) as Witch Doctor
- 2018: Bad Stepmother (TV Movie) as Cara
- 2018: Out of Blue as Miss Tolkington
- 2019: Poms as Ruby
- 2019: The Last Laugh as Gayle Johnson
- 2019: Darlin' as Effie
- 2019: Mejor que nunca as Ruby
- 2019: Raceland (Short) as Paula
- 2019: Queen Sugar (TV Series) as Martha Lavoisier
- 2019: Hot Date (TV Series) as Angela
- 2019: Gothic Harvest as Erzuline
- 2019: Small Ball (Short) as Millie
- 2019: Greyson Family Christmas as Gran Hattie
- 2020: Messiah (TV Series) as Old Woman at Baptist Church
- 2020: Lovecraft Country (TV Series) as Ms. Osberta
- 2020: In the Bag (TV Series) as Angry Ol' Bat
- 2020: Freedom's Path as Caddy
- 2021: Outer Banks (TV Series) as Pope's Great Grandma
