= Texas Frightmare Weekend =

Annual event

- Status: Active
- Genre: Horror/Media
- Venue: Irving Convention Center
- Location: Irving, Texas
- Country: USA
- Years active: 2006–2019, 2021–
- Organizer: Loyd Cryer
- Filing status: For Profit
- Website: texasfrightmareweekend.com

Texas Frightmare Weekend is a horror-oriented for-profit media event held annually in the Dallas, Texas, area. The weekend is a way for fans of the horror genre to connect with fellow horror lovers, meet guests that work in the genre, discover new films, and buy merchandise.

== Event information ==
Texas Frightmare Weekend began in 2006. The event was held at the Hyatt Regency DFW airport from 2012 to 2022. As of 2023, the event is held at the Irving Convention Center. The main convention space took place in two large ballrooms where guests and vendors had tables set up, much like a marketplace. The main convention area consisted of the guests, vendors selling horror themed merchandise, fans sporting horror cosplay costumes, and other attractions that the convention may have that given year, such as props from movies.

Guests have included actors, directors, and producers from classic and upcoming horror films. These guests are available for attendees to meet, purchase photo ops with and autographs from, as well as appear at panel discussions related to their work in the genre. Topics of panel discussions range from the horror genre in general, working in the genre, and question and answers sessions with the cast and creators of specific movies. The convention also hosts a film festival with screenings of popular horror movies and new ones. On Friday night after hours, there is a themed party that is free for VIP and premium pass holders, while anyone else has to pay for admission.

== Past events ==
The 1st Texas Frightmare Weekend was held February 4–5, 2006, at the Grapevine Convention Center in Grapevine, Texas. Guests included Joe Bob Briggs, Linnea Quigley, Ashlie Rhey, Brinke Stevens, Jon Keeyes, Scott von Doviak, Tom Savini, and Ses Carny. A Lifetime Achievement Award was presented to the "founding father of bad cinematic blood," Herschell Gordon Lewis.

The 2nd Texas Frightmare Weekend was held June 22–24, 2007, at the Omni Dallas Park West hotel in Dallas, Texas. The Guest of Honor at this event was director George A. Romero. Programming included a special presentation of "Inside the B-Actor's Studio with Clint Howard". A Lifetime Achievement Award was presented to effects maestro Tom Savini. Other guests included John Russo, Jeffrey Combs, Linnea Quigley, Doug Bradley, Ashley Laurence, Kristina Klebe, Danielle Harris, Nancy Loomis, Adrienne Barbeau, Lew Temple, Angela Bettis, Ken Evert, Eileen Dietz, Cerina Vincent, George Kosana, Russell Streiner, Charles Cyphers, Barbara Nedeljáková, Gaylen Ross, Jonathan Breck, Camden Toy, Tom Atkins, C. A. Broadstone, Anthony Simmons, Sid Haig, Bill Moseley, Lloyd Kaufman, Caroline Williams, and James Hampton.

The 3rd Texas Frightmare Weekend was held at the D/FW Lakes Hilton in Grapevine, Texas, on February 22–24, 2008. The event was kicked off with a red carpet event sponsored by AFI Dallas honoring the 40th anniversary of Night of the Living Dead. A vintage 35mm print of the classic horror film was screened followed by a panel discussion with the original cast moderated by Malcolm McDowell. Guests for the 2008 event included George A. Romero, Cassandra Peterson (Elvira), the cast of Night of the Living Dead, Dawn of the Dead, Day of the Dead, Land of the Dead, and Diary of the Dead. Also in attendance were McDowell, Dee Wallace, Danielle Harris, Kristina Klebe, and Scout Taylor-Compton from Rob Zombie's Halloween. Oscar-winning special effects master Greg Nicotero was also a guest as well as Tom Savini, Tom Atkins, Jason Lively, Coralina Cataldi-Tassoni, Kelli Maroney, Jim Wynorski, Lynn Lowry, Edwin Neal, Courtney Gains, Kathleen Kinmont, and Harvey Stephens in his first US appearance.

The 4th Texas Frightmare Weekend took place May 1–3, 2009, at the Sheraton Grand Hotel in Irving, Texas. Guests included director Tobe Hooper, shock rocker Alice Cooper, Karen Black, William Forsythe, Dick Miller, Derek Mears, Linda Blair, Terri McMinn, Fairuza Balk, C. J. Graham, Corbin Bernsen, Robert Green Hall, Bobbie Sue Luther, Johnathon Schaech, and Caroline Williams.

The 5th Texas Frightmare Weekend was held April 30-May 2, 2010, at the Sheraton Grand Hotel in Irving, Texas. The event kicked off with a premiere screening of 2001 Maniacs: Field of Screams with director Tim Sullivan. Guests included director John Carpenter, Lance Henriksen, George A. Romero, Sid Haig, Bill Moseley, Doug Bradley, Keith Gordon, Meg Foster, Alexandra Paul, Kane Hodder, Cassandra Peterson (Elvira), Charles Cyphers, Julian Sands, William Katt, Robert Green Hall, Danielle Harris, and Margot Kidder.

The 6th Texas Frightmare Weekend was held April 29-May 1, 2011, at the Sheraton Grand Hotel in Irving, Texas. The event kicked off with a screening of The Woman with director Lucky McKee. Guests included Robert Englund, Angus Scrimm, Clive Barker, Roger Corman, Cary Elwes, Malcolm McDowell, Costas Mandylor, Shawnee Smith, Yoshihiro Nishimura, Eihi Shiina, Noboru Iguchi, Brian Austin Green, A. Michael Baldwin, Doug Bradley, Don Coscarelli, Sid Haig, Ashley Laurence, Robert Green Hall, Jill Schoelen, and Boondock Saints Norman Reedus and Sean Patrick Flanery.

The 7th Texas Frightmare Weekend was held May 4–6, 2012, at the Hyatt Regency DFW Airport. Guests included Piper Laurie, Michael Madsen, Roddy Piper, Keith David, Nancy Allen, William Forsythe, Tony Todd, Lamberto Bava, Ruggero Deodato, Barry Corbin, Danielle Harris, Michael Biehn, Tom Savini, and stars from The Walking Dead.

The 8th Texas Frightmare Weekend was held May 3–5, 2013, at the Hyatt Regency DFW Airport. Guests included Danny Trejo, Nick Castle, Tom Skerritt, Gary Busey, Virginia Madsen, Diane Franklin, Mariel Hemingway, Stuart Gordon, Heather Langenkamp, Jeffrey Combs, Bill Moseley, Lou David, Ted White, and stars from The Walking Dead.

The 9th Texas Frightmare Weekend was held May 2–4, 2014, at the Hyatt Regency DFW Airport. Guests included George A. Romero, Chandler Riggs, Sarah Wayne Callies, Scott Wilson, the Soska sisters, Tobin Bell, and the stars of The Blair Witch Project for the 15th anniversary of the film.

The 10th Texas Frightmare Weekend was held May 1–3, 2015, at the Hyatt Regency DFW Airport. Guests included Scream stars Neve Campbell and Skeet Ulrich for their first ever convention appearance, Tara Reid, Malcom McDowell, Rachel True, and Cassandra Peterson.

The 11th Texas Frightmare Weekend was held April 29-May 1, 2016, at the Hyatt Regency DFW Airport. Guests included George A. Romero, Robert Englund, Heather Langenkamp, Tony Todd, stars from both the Scream movie franchise and MTV show, Rose Mgcowan, David Arquette, Skeet Ulrich, Matthew Lillard, Bex Taylor Klaus, and Carlson Young. The program that year was modeled to look like the newspaper from Day of the Dead.

The 12th Texas Frightmare Weekend was held May 5–7, 2017, at the Hyatt Regency DFW Airport. Guests included the stars of Rob Zombie's 31, Italian horror master Dario Argento, Freddie Highmore, Ryan Hurst, Max Theriot, and Nestor Carbonell from Bates Motel, wrestlers Sting and Ric Flair, and Misfits member Doyle.

The 13th Texas Frightmare Weekend was held May 4–6, 2018, at the Hyatt Regency DFW Airport. Guests included the young cast of the 2017 It remake, Billy Zane, six actors who played Jason in the Friday the 13th franchise in costume, the Cenobite actors from Hellraiser, and the stars of Child's Play.

The 14th Texas Frightmare Weekend was held May 3–5, 2019, at the Hyatt Regency DFW Airport. Guests included Bruce Campbell, Tim Curry, Barbara Hershey, Nick Castle, the stars of A Nightmare on Elm Street, and Jenna Jameson. The Friday Night party was Evil Dead themed.

The COVID-19 pandemic caused the 2020 event to first move from May to September, but ended up ultimately postponed until 2021.

The 15th Texas Frightmare Weekend was held September 10-12, 2021, at the Hyatt Regency DFW Airport. Guests included Tony Todd, Danny Trejo, Dana DeLorenzo, Kane Hodder, Malcolm McDowell, and Corey Taylor from Slipknot (band).

The 16th Texas Frightmare Weekend was held April 29 - May 1, 2022, at the Hyatt Regency DFW Airport. Guests included Brad Dourif and Fiona Dourif from the Child's Play (franchise), Neve Campbell, Matthew Lillard and others from the Scream (franchise), the stars of A Nightmare on Elm Street 3: Dream Warriors, a reunion of the cast from The Monster Squad, and Carl Weathers. The Friday Night party was Scream (1996 film) themed.

The 17th Texas Frightmare Weekend was held May 26-28, 2023 at the new location Irving Convention Center. Guests included John Carpenter, director of films such as Halloween, The Thing, and Escape From New York, Quinn Lord from Trick 'r Treat, Amber Midthunder from the Predator prequel Prey (2022 film), and many others. The Friday Night party was titled 'Halloween in Haddonfield' and was Halloween (1978 film) themed.

The 18th Texas Frightmare Weekend was held May 17-19, 2024 at the Irving Convention Center. Guests included Jane Levy from The Evil Dead sequel, Eli Roth director of films such as Cabin Fever, Hostel, and Thanksgiving (2023 film), along with Lin Shaye from the Insidious (film series), and featured a reunion of the writer, actors, and behind the scenes heroes from the original The Texas Chain Saw Massacre. The Friday Night party was titled 'Full Moon Festival' and was Werewolf themed as an ode to An American Werewolf in London.
