= Chris Kobin =

American film producer

Chris Kobin is a screenwriter and film producer living in Los Angeles, California.

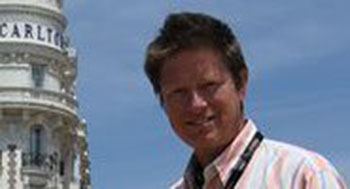
Chris Kobin in front of the Carleton Hotel at the 2010 Cannes Film Festival.

== Personal ==
Kobin, a graduate of Ridgewood High School (New Jersey), Macalester College and Loyola Law School, turned down an offer from a Century City law firm and became a car salesman while trying to break into Hollywood. The John Landis film Slasher: an IFC Original was based on Kobin's experiences traveling the country staging "slasher sales".

== Career ==
Kobin has produced the Made-For-TV Movies Payback ABC TV (1997), A Vision of Murder: The Story of Donielle CBS TV(2000), and Slasher: an IFC Original (2004). Feature Films which Kobin has written or co-written include Gothic Harvest (2019), 2001 Maniacs (2005), Snoop Dogg's Hood of Horror (2006), Driftwood (2006. and 2001 Maniacs: Field of Screams (2010).

== Film festival premieres ==
Kobin's films have premiered in the following film festivals:

- Screamfest Horror Film Festival: Gothic Harvest (2019)
- Telluride Film Festival: Hollywood Don't Surf! (2011) North American Premiere
- Cannes Film Festival: Hollywood Don't Surf! (2010)
- Screamfest Horror Film Festival: Snoop Doggs Hood of Horror (2006)
- South by Southwest: Slasher (2004)
- Slamdance Film Festival: The Girl Next Door (1999).

== Filmography ==
- The Hart Family Tragedy (2020)
- Gothic Harvest (2019)
- Hollywood Don't Surf! (2011)
- 2001 Maniacs: Field of Screams (2010)
- Driftwood (2006)
- Snoop Dogg's Hood of Horror (2006)
- 2001 Maniacs (2005)
- Slasher: an IFC Original (2004)
- A Vision of Murder: The Story of Donielle (2000)
- The Girl Next Door (1999)
- Payback (1997)

== Television series ==
- Flipping Vegas A&E Network (2011 - 2014)
