= Tim Sullivan (director) =

American film director, producer (born 1964)

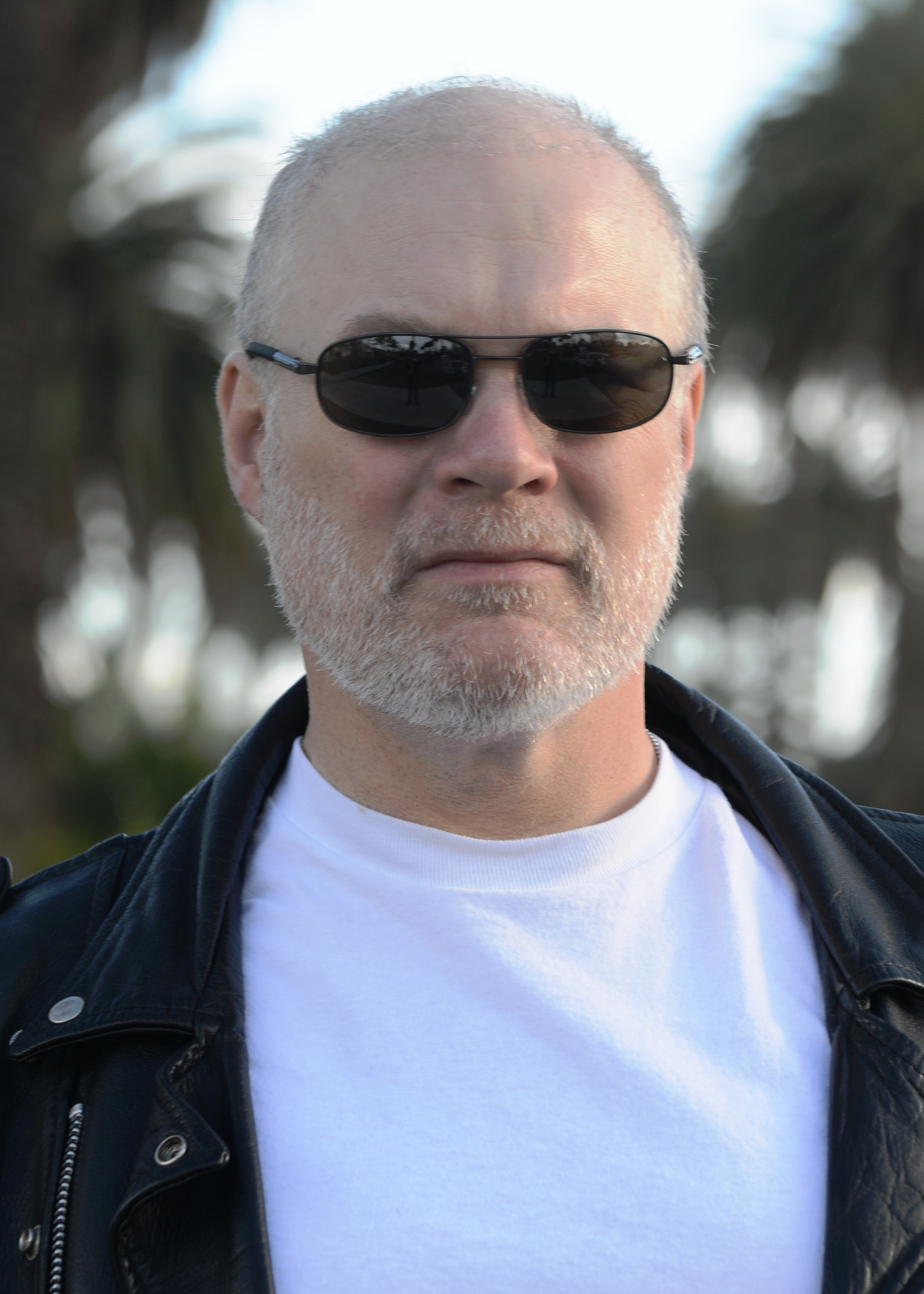
- Born: Timothy Michael Sullivan; July 2, 1964 (age 62); Plainfield, New Jersey, U.S.
- Occupations: Film director; screenwriter; songwriter; actor; producer

Timothy Michael Sullivan (born July 2, 1964) is an American film director, producer, actor, and screenwriter.

== Biography ==
=== Early career ===
Sullivan's career began as a teenager when he landed a job as a production assistant on the 1983 cult horror film Return of the Aliens: The Deadly Spawn. Sullivan majored in film studies at New York University, and his first writer/director/producer credit was the short A Christmas Treat (1985), for which he won Fangoria magazine's Short Film Search Award. While attending NYU, Sullivan wrote the music news for MTV. After graduating, he worked as a production assistant on award-winning films such as: Three Men and a Baby, Cocktail, Coming To America, and The Godfather Part III.

=== Career ===
He was production manager for the independent films If Looks Could Kill (1986) and America Exposed, (1990). After working in development at New Line Cinema for five years, Sullivan's mainstream directorial debut was the well-received Lion's Gate's horror-comedy, 2001 Maniacs (2005) starring Robert Englund and Lin Shaye. This was followed by Snoop Dogg's Hood of Horror (2005) (as co-writer and producer) and Driftwood (2006), a supernatural thriller about troubled youths at a reform camp, starring Raviv Ullman and Diamond Dallas Page.

Having released the MANIACS sequel 2001 Maniacs: Field of Screams (2010), Sullivan directed of Vh1's hit series Scream Queens (2010), as well as creator and host of Shock N Roll, his weekly talk and video blog on leading web network Fearnet.

Re-joining forces with Detroit Rock City director Adam Rifkin for the comedy/horror anthology Chillerama (2011), Sullivan contributed the musical segment I Was a Teenage Werebear starring Sean Paul Lockhart, followed by the Rifkin written and directed Burt Reynolds vehicle The Last Movie Star (2017), on which Sullivan earned an Associate Producer credit.

Sullivan then took an extended break from the industry (and Los Angeles) to focus on health, friends and family. It was during this time Sullivan formed his own production company, New Rebellion Entertainment., (with partners Diamond Dallas Page, Mike Markoff, Cooper Tomlinson and Nick Levay), creating and developing a variety of projects he will produce and direct in 2022, among them the George A. Romero’s version of Masque of the Red Death (in partnership with Dark Horse Entertainment and written by Steve Niles), and the Night Songs, which explores the paranormal romance between a music journalist and a vampiric young rock star featuring songs co-written by Sullivan with Doug Rockwell, Andreas Carlsson and Eric Singer of Kiss.

== Personal life ==
Sullivan is openly gay and an activist for equality and NOH8.

== Filmography ==
=== Actor ===
- If Looks Could Kill (1986) as Groom (uncredited)
- America Exposed as Biker
- Detroit Rock City (1999) as Kiss Concert Audience Member (uncredited)
- 2001 Maniacs (2005) as Coffin Harry
- Driftwood (2006) as Van Driver (uncredited)
- Famous Monster: Forrest J Ackerman (2007) as Himself
- The War Prayer (2007) as The Preacher
- Whore (2008) as Man in Black (uncredited)
- 2001 Maniacs: Field of Screams (2010) as Road Rascals Narrator (billed as Marc Ambrose)
- Scream Queens (2010) as Himself
- Chillerama (2011) as Coach Tuffman
- Chillerama: House of Psycho Charger (2011) as Sgt. Sullivan
- Bloody Bloody Bible Camp (2012) as Sister Mary Chopper
- Lost Soul: The Doomed Journey of Richard Stanley’s Island of Dr. Moreau (2014) as Himself
- Adi Shankar's Gods and Secrets (2016) as Red
- The Last Movie Star (2017) as Bouncer (uncredited)

=== Producer ===
- A Christmas Treat (1985)
- If Looks Could Kill (1986)
- America Exposed (1990)
- Detroit Rock City (1999) as associate producer
- Everclear: The Boys Are Back in Town Music Video (1999) as producer
- Snoop Dogg's Hood of Horror (2006)
- Killed on the Fourth of July (2010)
- Chillerama (2011) as executive producer
- Chillerama: House of Psycho Charger (PsychoCharger) Music Video (2011)
- One for the Road (2011) as executive producer
- Bloody Bloody Bible Camp (2012) as producer
- Cut/Print (2012) as producer
- The Last Movie Star (2017) as associate producer

=== Writer ===
- The Deadly Spawn (1983) Additional Dialogue
- A Christmas Treat (1985)
- 2001 Maniacs (2005)
- Snoop Dogg's Hood of Horror (2006)
- Driftwood (2006)
- 2001 Maniacs: Field of Screams (2010)
- Chillerama (segment I was a Teenage Werebear)(2011)

=== Director ===
- A Christmas Treat (1985)
- 2001 Maniacs (2005)
- Driftwood (2006)
- 2001 Maniacs: Field of Screams (2010)
- Chillerama (segment I was a Teenage Werebear)(2011)
- Chillerama: House of Psycho Charger (PsychoCharger) Music Video (2011)
- Mad World (Josh Brodis) 2012 Music Video (2012)
- Cut/Print LA Production (2012)
