= Social Capital Films =

Social Capital Films, a subsidiary of Social Capital Entertainment, is a media company based in Sausalito and Santa Monica, California. It was founded in 2004 by producer and real estate investor Martin Shore.

== Films ==
Social Capital Films recently produced and financed the psychological thriller, Tell-Tale, together with Ridley and Tony Scott. Tell Tale starred Josh Lucas, Lena Headey and Brian Cox, and was directed by Michael Cuesta (L.I.E., Dexter). They are soon to release 2001 Maniacs: Field of Screams, the highly anticipated sequel to 2001 Maniacs, the 2005 Lionsgate horror success that left genre fans demanding more.

Other previous films include the period drama The Countess (Julie Delpy's follow-up to 2 Days in Paris) and Hood of Horror (Lionsgate).

== Soundtracks ==
The company has also produced soundtracks for such films as Saw (Lionsgate), Saw II (Lionsgate), Rize (Lionsgate) and Rock School (Newmarket), as well as for television series including Summerland.
