= Slasher (2004 film) =

- DVD cover
- Directed by: John Landis
- Country of origin: United States
- Original language: English

Production
- Producers: Chris Kobin; Stephen Cantor; Daniel Laikand
- Running time: 85 minutes

Original release
- Network: Independent Film Channel
- Release: 2004

Slasher is a 2004 documentary film directed by John Landis for the Independent Film Channel. The film was produced by Chris Kobin, Stephen Cantor, and Daniel Laikand.

Shot over a weekend in Memphis, Tennessee, the film centers on uber-used car salesman Michael Bennett, a traveling master of the Slasher Sale, Kevin-the-DJ, and Mudd the closer, as they put on a tent-style used car sale.

== Reception ==
The film has met with critical acclaim, it currently holds an 80% score on Rotten Tomatoes.
