= As Good as Dead (2010 film) =

- Film poster
- Directed by: Jonathan Mossek
- Written by: Erez Mossek; Eve Pomerance
- Produced by: Edward Bass; Jordan Gertner; Eve Pomerance
- Starring: Andie MacDowell; Cary Elwes; Frank Whaley; Matt Dallas
- Cinematography: Frank Barrera
- Edited by: Julie Carr; Lee Percy
- Music by: Greg Arnold
- Distributed by: First Look Studios
- Release date: April 14, 2010 (Beverly Hills)
- Running time: 100 minutes
- Country: United States
- Language: English

As Good as Dead is a 2010 American crime thriller film directed by Jonathan Mossek and starring Andie MacDowell, Cary Elwes, Frank Whaley and Matt Dallas. It is Mossek's directorial debut.

The film premiered at the 2010 Beverly Hills Film Festival.

== Plot ==
Ethan Belfrage is a photojournalist who is separated from his wife. One afternoon he is confronted by two men, Aaron and Jake, who proceed to attack and kidnap him. They lock Ethan up and accuse him of being responsible for the death of their cult leader and pastor, who is the father of a third attacker, Helen Kalahan. Helen and Aaron claim that Ethan is one of the three assailants who killed the cult leader. When Ethan tries to contact his neighbor Sarah for help, they then kidnap her as well. Aaron, who has a neo-Nazi tattoo on his neck, hog-ties Sarah and begins questioning her. He asks if she and Ethan are in a relationship but she denies it.

The three attackers begin arguing and Helen angers Aaron by suggesting that he has psychological problems so he kills Sarah by injecting her with drugs. Aaron and Helen continue to torture Ethan until he confesses to murdering the pastor. They then make him write down the details of the pastor's murder but he refuses to cooperate, angering his attackers, who threaten to burn him alive. Ethan tries to delay them by telling them he has information containing details of the murder locked away. Aaron says that if Ethan can't find the information they will kill his daughter.

Based on the proof that was locked away, Helen realizes that Ethan is not responsible for the pastor's death and tells Aaron he must be set free. Furious at the idea of freeing Ethan, Aaron kidnaps Ethan's wife and daughter, holding them hostage. Jake intervenes to stop Aaron from killing the young girl and as such Aaron accidentally shoots him. Ethan is able to untie himself using a knife Helen had given him and kills both Aaron and Helen with Aaron's gun. The film ends with Ethan and his family free from the assailants with the house burning up in flames, and it is revealed that Ethan was responsible for the murder of the pastor after all.

== Cast ==
- Andie MacDowell as Helen Kalahan
- Cary Elwes as Ethan Belfrage
- Frank Whaley as Aaron
- Matt Dallas as Jake
- Nicole Ansari-Cox as Kate Belfrage
- Brian Cox as Reverend Kahalan
- Clark Middleton as Seth

== Reception ==
Jesse Cataldo of Slant Magazine gave the film one and a half stars.
