= Gothic Harvest =

2019 film

- Film poster
- Directed by: Ashley Hamilton
- Written by: Chris Kobin
- Produced by: Chris Kobin; Harvey Lowry; Rachel Meyer; Jeff Mullins
- Release date: August 1, 2019
- Country: United States
- Language: English

Gothic Harvest is a 2019 horror film shot in the French Quarter of New Orleans, Louisiana. It was directed by Ashley Hamilton, who also starred alongside Lin Shaye and Bill Mosley.

== Synopsis ==
The film follows the aristocratic, wealthy French Boudine family, who move to New Orleans in the mid-1800s to make their way in America, only to have their beautiful youngest daughter cross paths with the fiancé of the legendary Queen of Louisiana Voodoo, Marie Laveau. Their interlude results in a baby, which causes the entire family to become the focus of Laveau's most destructive curse.

== Cast ==
- Lin Shaye
- Bill Moseley
- Ashley Hamilton
- Sofia Mattsson
- Ashton Leigh
- Tanyell Q. Waivers
- Yohance Myles
- Michelle West
- Ciara Rizzo
- Ashton Mcclearin
- Abbie Gayle
- Mary Alice Risener
- Alex Biglae
- Carol Sutton
- David Kallaway
- Janee Michelle
- Gigi Zumbado
- Lashekia Armand

== Reception ==
The Los Angeles Times and Eye for Film were both critical of the movie, with the former stating "Most of this film consists of tedious scenes of partying and violence, with much of the latter being unpleasantly sexualized. Flashbacks and monologues attempt to explain the story’s roots in an ancient feud between vampires and voodoo priestesses, but no amount of lore — or bayou seasoning — can enrich this dull, derivative monster movie." WickedHorror questioned the presence of Lin Shaye and Bill Moseley in the movie, writing that "there’s a sense both Moseley and Shaye are above this kind of material, even if their presence makes the film significantly more palatable. None of the other performers makes an impression, save for the lady playing Laveau who gives it socks in her brief scene (take that, Ryan Murphy)."
