= Driftwood (2006 film) =

- Directed by: Tim Sullivan
- Written by: Tim Sullivan; Chris Kobin
- Produced by: Mike Richardson; Chris Kobin
- Starring: Raviv Ullman; Diamond Dallas Page; Talan Torriero; Connor Ross
- Cinematography: Steve Adcock
- Edited by: M. Scott Smith
- Music by: William Ross
- Distributed by: Image Entertainment; Dark Horse Indie
- Release dates: October 20, 2006 (Screamfest LA International Horror Film Festival); January 15, 2007 (United States)
- Running time: 90 minutes
- Country: United States
- Language: English

Driftwood is a 2006 horror film that was shown at the Screamfest LA International Horror Film Festival on October 20, 2006. The film was released on DVD on November 13, 2007. Driftwood was directed by Tim Sullivan and starring Raviv Ullman and Diamond Dallas Page.

== Plot ==
Riddled with guilt over the loss of his rock star older brother, 16-year-old David Forrester (Ricky Ullman) becomes obsessed with death, leading his misguided parents to send him to Driftwood, an "Attitude Adjustment Camp for Troubled Youths" run by the sadistic Captain Doug Kennedy (Diamond Dallas Page) and his brutal young henchman, Yates (Talan Torriero). Once there, David becomes haunted by the spirit of Jonathan (Connor Ross), a former inmate who met a mysterious end; a mystery whose resolution could very well be David's only way out.

== Cast ==
- Raviv Ullman as David Forrester
- Diamond Dallas Page as Captain Doug Kennedy
- Talan Torriero as Yates
- David Eigenberg as Norris
- Jeremy Lelliott as Noah
- Baelyn Neff as Myra
- Frankie Levangie as Boyle
- Connor Ross as Jonathan
- Cory Hardrict as Darryl
- David Skyler as K.C.
- Shahine Ezell as Cobey
- John Walcutt as Quails
- Lou Beatty Jr. as Doc
- Kim Morgan Greene as Mrs. Sherman
- Russell Sams as Dean Forrester
- Lin Shaye as Nancy Forrester
- Marc McClure as Rich Forrester
