= Oris Buckner =

American police detective (1951–2022)

Oris Benny Buckner III
- Born: July 16, 1951
- Died: June 1, 2022 (aged 70)
- Occupation: Police detective
- Known for: Revealing racism and violence in the New Orleans Police Department
- Relatives: Carol Sutton (sister)

Oris Benny Buckner III (July 16, 1951 – June 1, 2022) was an American police detective. He revealed the extensive culture of racism and violence in the New Orleans Police Department (NOPD). His testimony was the basis for a number of civil suits against 55 defendants, which resulted in a $2.8 million settlement by the city of New Orleans in 1986. He was the brother of actress Carol Sutton.

== Background ==
On November 9, 1980, officer Gregory Neupert was shot and killed in Algiers, New Orleans, and witnesses reported seeing two white men flee the scene. Police attention was immediately focused on the predominantly Black neighborhood where the shooting had taken place. Robert Davis and Johnny Brownlee were interrogated by police as potential witnesses. Police pressured the two Black men to identify two other Black men as the people who shot officer Neupert. After they refused, police beat and tortured Davis and Brownlee.

Detective Oris Buckner, the only Black homicide detective in the department, was invited to participate in the beatings. Buckner briefly took part by slapping Davis across the face once. After trying to stop other officers from continuing, Buckner was removed from the interrogation. The officers then brought Davis and Brownlee to a bridge, where they were further coerced into identifying James Billy Jr. and Reginald Miles as the people who shot officer Neupert.

After obtaining the coerced witness statements, police served warrants at Billy and Miles' houses. Buckner was outside Miles' home when the raid took place. Buckner reported hearing police start shooting immediately after entering the house. Police shot and killed Miles and Billy. They also killed Sherry Singleton, the pregnant girlfriend of Miles, who was shot by a shotgun and pistol while naked in the bathtub. Police also shot and killed Raymond Ferdinand during a separate raid related to the Neupert investigation.

Days after the raids that killed four Black people, Oris Buckner reported the crimes to a state Assistant District Attorney. An all white state grand jury declined indicting any of the officers. The decision not to indict sparked protests in the city. A federal grand jury indicted seven officers in July 1981, of civil rights violations. Due to the media attention and resignation of police superintendent James Parsons, the trial was moved to Dallas. In March 1983, three of the seven officers were found guilty, John E. McKenzie, Dale Bonura, and Stephen Farrar.

The killing of Gregory Neupert was never solved, and nobody was ever charged in the deaths in Reginald Miles, James Billy Jr., Sherry Singleton, or Raymond Ferdinand. After Buckner's death in 2022, the Louisiana state legislature passed a resolution offering condolences to the Buckner family.
