= Los Angeles Overnight =

- Film poster
- Directed by: Michael Chrisoulakis
- Written by: Guy J. Jackson
- Produced by: Michael Chrisoulakis; Kate Rees Davies; Camilla Jackson; Guy J. Jackson; Kimmie Yan
- Starring: Lin Shaye; Sally Kirkland; Peter Bogdanovich
- Cinematography: Stefan Colson
- Edited by: Melanie Annan; Michael Chrisoulakis
- Music by: Michael Lira
- Production company: High Noon Films
- Distributed by: Arena Cinelounge Releasing
- Release date: March 9, 2018
- Running time: 93 minutes
- Countries: United States; Australia
- Language: English

Los Angeles Overnight is a 2018 American-Australian thriller film directed by Michael Chrisoulakis and featuring Lin Shaye, Sally Kirkland and Peter Bogdanovich.

== Cast ==
- Lin Shaye
- Arielle Brachfield
- Azim Rizik
- Carey Fox
- Julian Bane
- Sally Kirkland
- Peter Bogdanovich
- Camilla Jackson
- Ashley Park

== Production ==
The film was shot entirely in Los Angeles.

== Release ==
The film was released in theaters on March 9, 2018. Then it was released in digital platforms on March 20 that same year.

== Reception ==
Bobby LePire of Film Threat graded the film a C.
