= Jessica Sonneborn =

American film producer

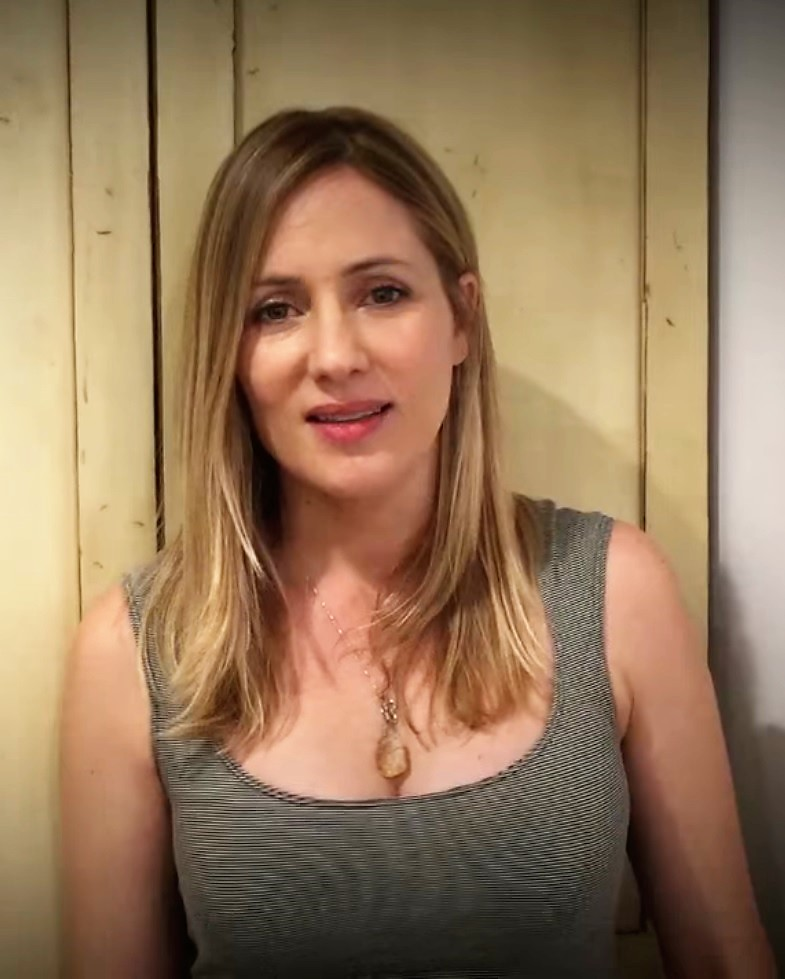
- Sonneborn interviewed in 2017
- Occupations: Actress, producer, writer, director, Stunt double
- Years active: 2004–present

Jessica Sonneborn is an American actress, writer, director and stunt double, who is known for starring roles in Bloody Bloody Bible Camp and Dorothy and the Witches of Oz.

== Career ==
Sonneborn worked on many independent films in New England before moving to LA and debuted in The Midnight Shorts Collection (2004) and since then regularly appeared in feature films, direct-to-video productions, TV series, TV mini-series and Short movies. Being a sought-after horror movie actress, she appeared in Detour into Madness Vol. 1, Camp Slaughter, School of Horror, A Lure: Teen Fight Club, Bloody Bloody Bible Camp and recently in House Across The Street (starring Eric Roberts), Piranha Sharks (starring Kevin Sorbo) and her self-written movie Alice D (starring Kane Hodder and Al Snow). She also appeared in popular TV series such as United States of Tara, Hello Ladies and Cuts.

Graduated from Wheaton College with a BA in Anthropology, and Lesley University with a Masters in Education.

== Filmography ==
=== Film ===
Year	Title	Role	Notes
2004	The Midnights Shorts Collection	Pheobe	Video
2005	Camp Slaughter	Elizabeth	Video
2005	Detour into Madness Vol. 1	Nikki/Carrie	Video
2006	Shadows Fall	Jillian Storm	Video
2006	Banana Bread	Jenny	Short
2007	Weapons	Girl #2	
2007	School of Horror	Tonya	Video
2007	The Cure	Secretary	TV movie
2008	The Dropout	Trixie/Czech Beatnik	Short
2008	Time	Rose	Short
2009	Spring Breakdown	Sorority Girl	Video
2010	Repo	Pacer Owner	
2010	A Lure: Teen Fight Club	Maggie/Kate	Video
2012	Dorothy and the Witches of Oz	Ev Locast	
2012	Noah	Townswoman (voice)	
2012	Bloody Bloody Bible Camp	Brittany	
2012	Money Shot	Lena Starr	
2013	The House Across the Street	Amy	
2013	Rabid Love	Julie Allen	
2013	American Girls	Dr. Monica Rourke	
2014	Alpha House	Stephanie	Video
2014	Alice D	Natasha	
2014	Never Open the Door	Tess	
2015	Pain Is Beautiful	Samantha Raymond	
2015	Silence	Leah	
2015	Extracurricular Activities	Maggie	
2016	Dog Eat Dog	Judge	
2016	One Night of Fear	Katie	
2017	Piranha Sharks	Raven	
2017	Dark Roads 79	Mackenzie Austin	
2017	The Basement	Carlee	
2019	The Letter Red	Margaret Banquo	
2019	Wild Boar	Sable	
2020	The Voices	Morgan	
2020	Disrupted	Crystal	
2020	Happy Horror Days	Jane/Betty	
2020	Death By Midnight	Agnes	
2022	Drawn Into the Night	Kate/Maggie	
2023	Britney Lost Her Phone	Maggie Youngman	

=== Television ===
Year	Title	Role	Notes
2006	Cuts	Penelope	Episode: "Carpal Kids"
2010	United States of Tara	Nay Nay	Episode: "From This Day Forward"
2011	The Witches of Oz	Ev Locast	Episode: "Episode #1.1"
2012	Love Squared	Samantha	Main Cast
2013	Hello Ladies	Casting Associate	Episode: "The Wedding"
2014	Tinker Steampunk	Fleur de Lis	Episode: "The Telephone Rang"
2014	Red Sleep	Katrina Long	Recurring Cast
2016	#15SecondScare	Jennifer Runner	Episode: "The Jogging Dead"

=== Music Videos ===
Year	Song	Artist	Role
2010	"Feel Better"	Nikki Lang	Girl in Black #3

== Awards ==
- 2014: Rhode Island International Horror Film Festival Award – Alice D – Best Feature (Won)
- 2014: Chicago Horror Film Festival Award- Alice D – Best Writer (Nomination)
- 2014 IFS Winner Best Horror Movie: Alice D
- 2014 Shawna Shae Film Festival, Best Horror Film: Alice D
