= Prom Wars =

- Theatrical release poster
- Directed by: Phil Price
- Written by: Myles Hainsworth
- Produced by: Brandi-Ann Milbradt
- Starring: Raviv Ullman; Alia Shawkat; Rachelle Lefèvre; Kevin Coughlin
- Cinematography: Michel St-Martin
- Edited by: Phil Price; David Eberts
- Production company: Philms Pictures
- Distributed by: Domino Film
- Release date: May 9, 2008 (Canada)
- Running time: 90 minutes
- Country: Canada
- Language: English
- Budget: C$3.5 million

Prom Wars is a 2008 Canadian teen comedy film directed by Phil Price and starring Raviv Ullman, Alia Shawkat, Rachelle Lefèvre, and Kevin Coughlin.

== Premise ==
The graduating class at Miss Aversham and Miss Cronstall's School for Girls find that they have – in defiance of the natural laws of probability – all blossomed simultaneously. Capitalizing on their unique status, and intent on teaching high school boys to never take girls for granted, they issue a challenge to the boys of Easthill's rival private schools, Selby and Lancaster. The winner in a series of designated competitions will be awarded exclusive rights to the girls as prom dates. Like the capricious and meddlesome gods of Greek mythology, the ACS girls pit the boys' schools against each other in a (secret) Prom War.

== Cast ==
- Raviv Ullman as Percy Collins
- Alia Shawkat as Diana Riggs
- Rachelle Lefèvre as Sabina
- Nicolas Wright as Joseph
- Kevin Coughlin as Geoffrey
- Chad Connell as Rupert
- Jesse Rath as Francis
- Yann Bernaquez as Hamish
- Cory Hogan as Jasper
- Noah Bernett as Kyle
- Alexandra Cohen as Maggie
- Meaghan Rath as Jen L.
- Mélanie St-Pierre as Jen Bergman
- Daniel Rindress-Kay as Northrop
- Keenan MacWilliam as Meg
