= Living the Dream (film) =

- DVD cover
- Directed by: Christian Schoyen; Allan Fiterman
- Written by: Screenplay: Christian Schoyen; Luis Fernandez Reneo
- Produced by: Allan Fiterman; Christian Schoyen; Christin Tellefsen
- Starring: Sean Young; Christian Schoyen; Danny Trejo
- Distributed by: Paramount (Europe)
- Release date: 2006
- Running time: 92 minutes
- Country: United States
- Language: English

Living the Dream is a 2006 comedy-drama film starring Sean Young, Christian Schoyen, and Danny Trejo. It was written by Christian Schoyen and Luis Fernandez Reneo from a story by Christian Schoyen and directed by Christian Schoyen and Allan Fiterman. It was produced by Allan Fiterman, Christian Schoyen and Christin Tellefsen. The production company was Rover Films.

The Los Angeles Times review said; "It's downright misanthropic ...farcical drama with the most hostile cinematic view of Los Angeles since Crash. There is undeniable heart in Living the Dream, with its implicit criticism of mercenary values".

== Plot ==
Living the Dream is a story about two friends, Brenda (Sean Young) and Jonathan (Christian Schoyen), who after being bullied as children become corrupt when growing up because they have been conditioned to believe that they need to achieve materialistic success to be 'accepted' and liked by others.

== Cast ==
- Sean Young as Brenda
- Christian Schoyen as Jonathan
- Danny Trejo as Chuck
- Matt Dallas as Michael
- Jeff Conaway as Dick
