= Joseph Ehrenkranz =

American rabbi (1926–2014)

Joseph Ehrenkranz (May 7, 1926 – February 23, 2014) was an American Orthodox rabbi.

== Life and career ==
Ehrenkranz was born in Newark, New Jersey on May 7, 1926. He received his ordination at Yeshiva University in 1949. He was the rabbi of Congregation Agudath Sholom in Stamford, Connecticut from 1948 until 1992.

From 1992 until his retirement in July 2007 he was the executive director of the Center for Christian-Jewish Understanding at Sacred Heart University in Fairfield, Connecticut, of which he was one of the co-founders.

Ehrenkranz was the Synagogue Council of America's representative to the United Nations in 1985.

== Family and death ==
Among his grandchildren is the actor Raviv Ullman.

Ehrenkranz died on February 23, 2014, at the age of 87.

== Publications ==
- Interfaith Dialogue: The Theory and the Practice (with Rabbi Eugene Korn)
- Religion, Woman and Family

== Sources ==
- "Congregation Agudath Sholom, Orthodox", The American Synagogue (Greenwood Publishing Group)
