= Matt Dallas =

American actor (born 1982)

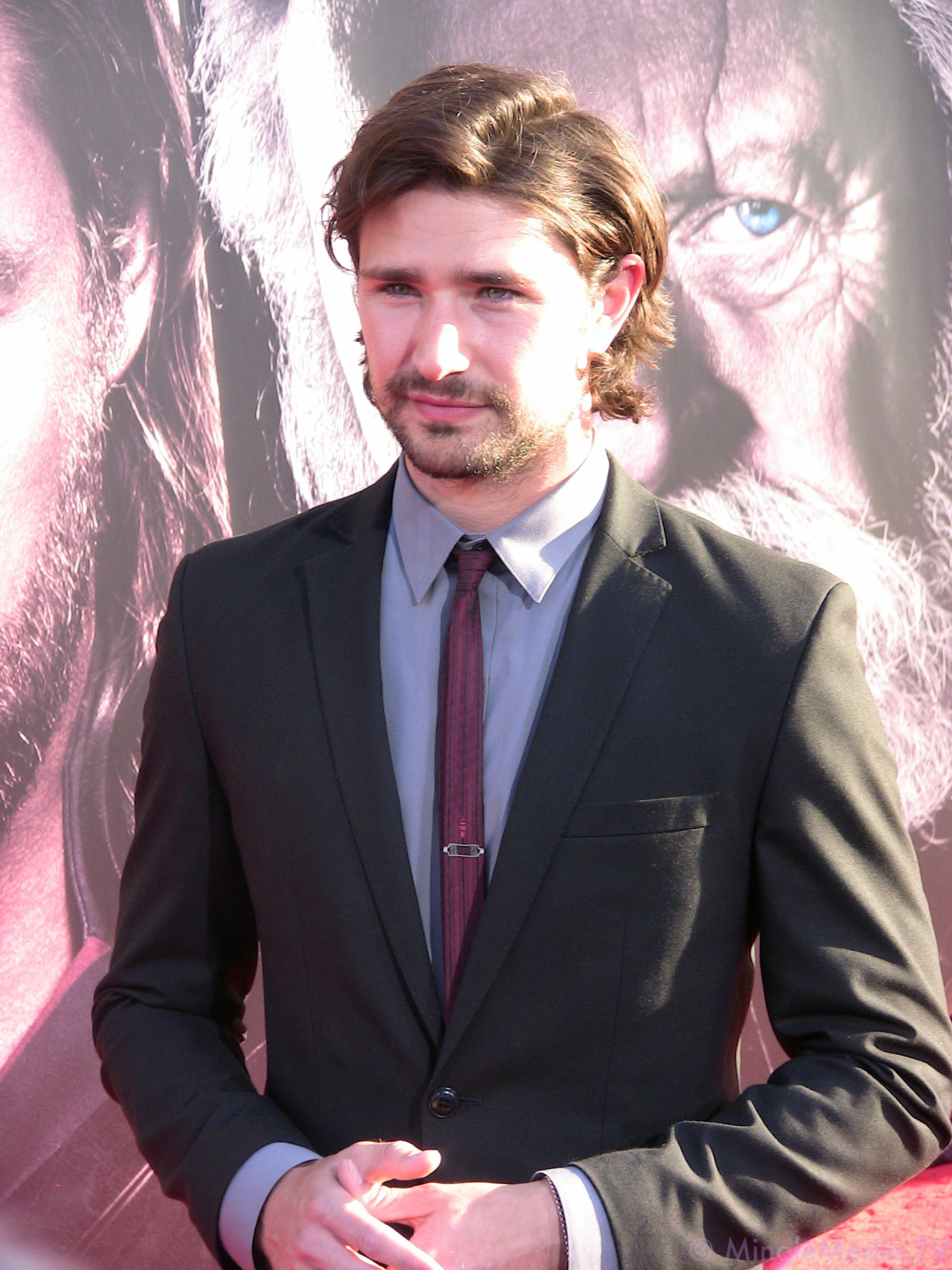
- Dallas at the world premiere for Thor in Hollywood Heights, Los Angeles, 2011
- Born: Matthew Joseph Dallas; October 21, 1982 (age 44); Phoenix, Arizona, U.S.
- Occupation: Actor
- Years active: 2004–present
- Spouse: Blue Hamilton (m. 2015)
- Children: 2

Matthew Joseph Dallas (born October 21, 1982) is an American actor, best known for playing the title character on the ABC Family series Kyle XY.

== Early life ==
Dallas was born in Phoenix, Arizona, briefly attending Arizona School for the Arts before graduating from Paradise Valley High School. He has two younger brothers and one younger sister. He became interested in acting at the age of 12, when his grandmother took him to a production of the play The Ugly Duckling at a local community theater called Desert Stages Theater.

== Career ==
Dallas has starred in several films, and has played the title character in the ABC Family television series Kyle XY for three seasons. The series ended on March 16, 2009, after it was canceled by ABC. Dallas also appeared in Camp Slaughter (2005), Living The Dream (2006), and Babysitter Wanted (2008). He has been a guest on the TV show Entourage.

In 2004, Dallas starred in Fan_3's music video for Geek Love. In 2005, Dallas starred with Mischa Barton in James Blunt's music video for Goodbye My Lover and in 2008 he starred in Katy Perry's music video for "Thinking of You".

Dallas was cast in ABC's Eastwick, playing Roxie's (Rebecca Romijn) love interest. In 2009, it was announced that Dallas would be appearing in the movie Beauty and the Briefcase with Hilary Duff. Dallas was in an indie western film called The First Ride of Wyatt Earp as Bat Masterson, which was released on March 6, 2012.

In 2012, Dallas starred as Max in the musical love story movie You, Me, & the Circus. He played the role of Bat Masterson in an action packed western movie Wyatt Earp's Revenge with Val Kilmer. He also starred as Lance Leigh in the Hallmark movie Naughty or Nice with Hilarie Burton. Dallas played the role of Scott Orenhauser in the indie sci-fi thriller film Life Tracker. Dallas had a recurring role in ABC Family show Baby Daddy, where he played Riley's (Chelsea Kane) love interest.

In 2014, Dallas starred in the horror comedy movie Ghost of Goodnight Lane. In 2015, Dallas starred as Jake in the web series Anne & Jake. The series was released on YouTube on November 11, 2015. In 2017, Dallas starred as Declan in the drama film Alaska is a Drag, written and directed by Shaz Bennett. He also starred as Frank Dean in the western film Painted Woman directed by James Cotten.

In 2018, Dallas starred as pastor John in supernatural horror film Along Came the Devil. In 2019, Dallas played the role of Greg Carlyle in the Lifetime thriller film A Daughter's Plan to Kill alongside Claire Coffee. He also co-starred as Bobby Browning in the romantic comedy Nearly Married starring Cassi Thomson.

== Personal life ==
Dallas is gay. On July 5, 2015, he married musician Blue Hamilton. On December 22, 2015, Dallas and Hamilton announced on their YouTube channel that they had adopted a then two-year-old, their son Crow. On July 16, 2022, via YouTube, the pair announced they had adopted their second child, Rosa.

== Filmography ==
=== Films ===
Year	Title	Role	Notes
2005	Way of the Vampire	Todd	
2005	Camp Slaughter	Mario	
2005	Wannabe	Monkee Dancer No. 1	
2006	Living the Dream	Michael	
2006	Shugar Shank	Evan	Short film
2007	The Indian	Danny	Monaco Film Festival Award for Best Newcomer
2008	Babysitter Wanted	Rick	
2010	As Good as Dead	Jake	
2010	In Between Days	Ashley	Short film
2010	Beauty & the Briefcase	Seth	Television movie
2011	The Story of Bonnie and Clyde	Henry Methvin	
2012	You, Me & The Circus	Max	
2012	Wyatt Earp's Revenge	Bat Masterson	
2012	Naughty or Nice	Lance Leigh	Television movie
2013	Into The Heart of America	Documentarian	Documentary
2013	Isolated	Ambassador	
2013	Life Tracker	Scott Orenhouser	
2014	The Ghost of Goodnight Lane	Ben	
2014	1% ERS (short)	Ryan	Short film
2017	Alaska Is a Drag	Declan	
2017	Painted Woman	Frank Dean	
2018	Along Came the Devil	Pastor John	
2019	Nearly Married	Bobby Browning	previous titled: Where Are You, Bobby Browning?
2019	A Daughter's Plan to Kill	Greg Carlyle	Lifetime movie
2023	Shoulder Dance	Ira	
2024	Sheepdog	Darryl Sparks	

=== Television ===
Year	Title	Role	Notes
2005	Entourage	Male model	Episode: "Chinatown"
2006–2009	Kyle XY	Kyle Trager / Young Adam Baylin	Main role Nominated—Saturn Award for Best Actor on Television (2007–08); Nominated—Teen Choice Award for Choice Drama Series
2009	Eastwick	Chad Burton	Recurring role (6 episodes)
2013–2014	Baby Daddy	Fitch Douglas	Recurring role (5 episodes)
2015	Anne & Jake	Jake	Web-series
2016	Worst Cooks in America	Himself	Reality competition show

=== Music videos ===
Year	Title	Role	Notes
2004	"Geek Love"	Geek	Music video by Fan 3
2005	"Goodbye My Lover"		Music video by James Blunt
2009	"Thinking of You"	Love interest	Music video by Katy Perry
2014	"It's My Belly Button"	Kyle XY	Music video by Rhett and Link
