= Camp Slaughter =

- DVD released by Screamkings Productions
- Directed by: Alex Pucci
- Screenplay by: Draven Gonzales
- Story by: Alex Pucci
- Produced by: Alex Pucci; Pete Jacelone
- Starring: Kyle Lupo; Matt Dallas; Miles Davis; Jon Fleming; Eric McIntire; Joanna Suhl; Bethany Taylor; Anika C. McFall
- Cinematography: Pete Jacelone; Jonathan Williams
- Edited by: James Conant; Jonathan Williams
- Music by: Brad Fowler
- Production company: Screamkings Productions
- Distributed by: Screamkings Productions; Lightning Home Entertainment
- Release date: June 20, 2005
- Running time: 94 minutes; 110 minutes (director's cut)
- Country: United States
- Language: English

Camp Slaughter (also known as Camp Daze) is a 2005 slasher film written and directed by Alex Pucci, and co-written by Draven Gonzales.

== Plot ==
During a sing-along at Camp Hiawatha in 1981, two revelers sneak away to have sex and are killed by an unseen assailant. Twenty-four years later, four friends (Angela, Jen, Mario, and Vade) are driving through the area on their way to Boston. The quartet becomes lost (passing the same sign several times) and their SUV breaks down after night comes unusually early. All the electronics fail to work, and the group is thrown into hysterics when screams emanate from the surrounding forest, and the vehicle is pelted with debris, prompting them to spend the night in it.

In the morning, the travelers are found by campers and counselors from Hiawatha, and invited to stay at the camp, which looks like it has not changed since the 1980s. As the quartet is shown around (noticing how anachronistic the place is) someone murders any campers who go off on their own or in a pair. That night, the killer rampages through the facilities, butchering everyone except the quartet. At dawn, the travelers awaken to discover that nothing appears to be wrong and that everyone is alive again.

Daniel and Ivan, a pair of counselors who are aware of what is going on, find the four, and explain that the camp is in a time loop, stuck repeating the day of the killing spree. To prove they are telling the truth, the counselors take the others to witness the first murder, a strangulation in the woods, which they have never been able to stop, despite their best efforts. The time-displaced four try to leave on their own, but the SUV will not appear until nightfall, and walking away just brings them back to Hiawatha. Daniel and Ivan state that they are limited in what they can do, but with the help of outsiders, they may be able to break the loop and move on to whatever fate awaits them.

The night of the massacre, it is revealed that Daniel and Ivan are the murderers and that they manipulated Michelle and Ruben, a pair of outcasts, into helping them with their thrill killing. The psychopaths intend to have the travelers take their place in the cycle, which they believe they can achieve by murdering them, so they can get out. Mario and Vade die, but Angela and Jen manage to kill Daniel and Ivan. The girls go to the SUV, where Lou, the groundskeeper, is attacking Michelle and Ruben. Lou snaps Michelle's neck and exposits that he took out the perpetrators of the original massacre minutes after it occurred. A wounded Ruben then shoots an arrow into Angela's chest and is stomped to death by Lou as Jen escapes in the SUV.

Three years later, Jen has become a successful writer, and while in her office one day, she receives an email. It is from Daniel and Ivan, who have written that they cannot wait to meet their "favorite author" soon.

== Cast ==
- Kyle Lupo as Daniel
- Anika McFall as Jen
- Joanna Suhl as Angela
- Jon Fleming as Ivan
- Eric McIntire as Vade
- Matt Dallas as Mario
- Bethany Taylor as Michelle
- Miles Davis as Ruben
- Ashley Gomes as Nicole
- Philip Jess as Jay
- Ikaika Kahoano as Patrick
- Jessica Sonneborn as Elizabeth
- Troy Andersen as Tommy
- Brendan Bradley as Paul Marq
- Kyle Langan as Wesley
- Jesse Gurtis as Mark
- Amanda Gallagher as Linda
- Jim Marlowe as Lou

== Production and release ==
Camp Slaughter was conceived as a low-budget homage to the slasher films of the 1980s. Director Alex Pucci and screenwriter Draven Gonzales incorporated elements associated with films such as Friday the 13th and Sleepaway Camp, while combining the summer-camp slasher setting with a time-loop premise. The film was made with a reported budget of approximately $100,000 and was shot digitally with a small crew and practical special effects. Actress Jessica Sonneborn later recalled that the film was her first feature-length production and first location shoot. She said that the production was known as Camp Slaughter during filming.

The film circulated under both Camp Slaughter and its original title, Camp Daze. Two cuts were released: a shorter version of approximately 94 minutes and a 110-minute director's cut. The DVD edition released by Screamkings Productions included behind-the-scenes footage, a featurette on the special effects, trailers and pre- and post-production teasers.

== Reception ==
Jeremy Wheeler of AllMovie reviewed the film under the title Camp Slaughter. Jay Seaver of eFilmCritic gave the film two out of five stars, criticizing its logic and characterization while saying that its appeal was largely limited to viewers interested in gore.

Felix Vasquez of Cinema Crazed regarded the film more favorably as a deliberate homage to 1980s slasher films. He praised its use of genre conventions, gore and horror-comedy elements, but criticized its acting, editing, characterization and plot inconsistencies. Francis Barbier of DeVilDead considered the central time-loop idea inventive but criticized the direction, performances, characterization, cinematography and sound. He nevertheless identified its references to 1980s slasher films as one of its more effective elements.

== See also ==
- List of films featuring time loops
