= Room for Rent (2019 film) =

2019 mystery film directed by Tommy Stovall

- Film poster
- Directed by: Tommy Stovall
- Written by: Stuart Flack
- Produced by: Marc S. Sterling; Tommy Stovall
- Starring: Lin Shaye; Oliver Rayón; Valeska Miller; Ryan Ochoa; Linda Cushma
- Cinematography: Ben Brahem Ziryab
- Music by: Joseph Bishara
- Production company: Pasidg Productions Inc.
- Distributed by: Uncork'd Entertainment
- Release date: February 23, 2019 (Sedona International Film Festival)
- Running time: 81 minutes
- Country: United States
- Language: English

Room for Rent is a 2019 mystery-horror film written by Stuart Flack, directed by Tommy Stovall and starring Lin Shaye. The movie was produced by Pasidg Productions Inc. and distributed by Uncork'd Entertainment. Room for Rent was released on February 23, 2019, at the Sedona International Film Festival in Sedona, Arizona. The film concerns an aging widow who rents a room in her house in order to make some money. Things take a deadly turn when she becomes strangely obsessed with one of her new tenants.

== Plot ==
Elderly housewife Joyce Smith (Lin Shaye) is left distraught after her husband Fred mysteriously dies in a slip and fall accident while fixing the roof. Her probate attorney tells her that he owed a substantial amount of money on a loan, and apart from $2,200 in savings, he left no other assets in his name.

While in the library, Joyce notices a magazine that teaches homeowners how to turn their properties into a bnb (bed and breakfast), and later converts her property. A young writer, Sarah, and her husband Edward become the first lodgers. Joyce bonds with Sarah but Edward is put off by her demeanor; they promptly leave but she and Sarah stay in touch via letters.

Soon after, a handsome young man named Robert moves into Joyce's house. She becomes infatuated with him, making special dinners, dressing up to impress him, and even gets a satellite dish so he can watch an all-football channel. After divorcing Edward, Sarah visits Joyce and shares an intimate night with Robert, causing a rift between herself and Joyce.

Joyce's neighbor Gladys tells Sarah she fell out with Joyce a while back due to her split-thinking and abandonment issues. Gladys also tells her that Fred forced Joyce to abort a baby. After Sarah leaves, Joyce visits Gladys and suffocates her with a pillow. When Robert asks Joyce where Sarah went, she lies and claims she has returned home to her husband, making Robert feel worthless. He later catches Joyce going through his belongings and confronts her; she tells him he reminds her of her son who died years ago. Robert accepts the lie but remains cautious.

Joyce makes Robert a home-cooked meal but spikes his food and then rapes him while he is unconscious. She later finds money and cocaine in his belongings, suggesting he is a drug trafficker. After awakening, Robert finds a letter from Sarah, revealing Joyce's lies and manipulations. He confronts Joyce and then collects his belongings, intending to move out, but Joyce bludgeons him with a frying pan, killing him. She reads the rest of Sarah's letter to Robert, in which Sarah reveals that she is pregnant.

Joyce, who has always wanted a child, invites Sarah to stay at her home while Joyce takes a vacation using Robert's drug money. Joyce buries Robert's remains in the backyard and gets rid of his personal items. Sarah goes to Robert's old room but finds it locked. Unbeknownst to Sarah, Joyce has redesigned the room into a nursery, leaving behind a welcoming sign from grandma, foreboding her return after Sarah has given birth.

== Cast ==
- Lin Shaye as Joyce
- Oliver Rayón as Robert
- Valeska Miller as Sarah
- Ryan Ochoa as Wayne
- Linda Cushma as Gladys
- Casey Nicholas Price as Edward
- Tonya June Moore as Sheila

== Release ==
=== Reception ===
On review aggregator Rotten Tomatoes, Room for Rent has an approval rating of 83% based on 12 reviews. Frank Scheck of The Hollywood Reporter called it "essential viewing for Lin Shaye fans" and wrote: "The supporting characters are not nearly as well-developed or interesting, feeling more like plot devices and reducing the film's overall impact. And director Stovall (Aaron's Blood), although certainly competent, doesn't infuse the proceedings with the sort of cinematic stylishness that would have elevated Room for Rent above B-movie status. Nonetheless, it's essential viewing for Lin Shaye fans, and that's more than enough." Maria Lattila writing for the "Film Inquiry" told about the film: "Room For Rent is a lovely little thriller gem, a real diamond in the rough. It's not a class A film or cinema at its purest, but it explores some fascinating themes and one of Lin Shaye's best performances. Alex Saveliev from the online publication Film Threat gave the movie 7 out of 10 stars and stated: "Tommy Stoval's unpretentious descent into madness has a mercifully short running time. Fun and chilling, this bed-and-breakfast gets an extra star for its committed hostess.
