= Bloody Bloody Bible Camp =

2012 film directed by Vito Trabucco

- Directed by: Vito Trabucco
- Written by: Vito Trabucco, Shelby McIntyre
- Produced by: Reggie Bannister, David C. Hayes
- Release date: May 5, 2012 (Texas Frightmare Weekend)
- Running time: 90 minutes

Bloody Bloody Bible Camp is a 2012 American horror-comedy/splatter film. The film was directed by Vito Trabucco and produced by Reggie Bannister, who stars as Father Richard Cummings. The film also features Tim Sullivan as a cross dressing nun and Ron Jeremy as Jesus.

== Plot ==
In 1977, a group of young people are massacred at the hands of Sister Mary Chopper at the Happy Day Bible Camp. Only two people survive the slaughter, Millie and Dwayne, the latter of whom was left with brain damage. Seven years later, Father Richard Cummings leads a group of teenagers to the camp, despite warnings from a concerned local about the camp, now dubbed 'Bloody Bloody Bible Camp'. Accompanying Father Cummings is Millie, who is keeping her past history with the camp a secret despite her ongoing trauma over the event. Eventually, Sister Mary Chopper resumes her slaughter, eventually leaving only Father Cummings and goth camper Jennifer alive. Father Cummings has a near death experience where he meets Jesus, who tells him that while it is OK to be homosexual, it is not OK that he brought the teenagers here and that he must save the camp. It is revealed that the killer is actually Eugene, a goth local who had been at a convenience store that the campers had stopped at earlier in the film. Tormented by an abusive nun who raised him as a girl and led him to believe that sin must be physically punished with death, Father Cummings manages to defeat Sister Mary Chopper and bring an end to the chaos.

== Cast ==
- Reggie Bannister as Father Richard Cummings
- Tim Sullivan as Sister Mary Chopper / Eugene
- Ron Jeremy as Jesus
- Ivet Corvea as Millie
- Matthew Aidan as Tad
- Jessica Sonneborn as Brittany
- Deborah Venegas as Jennifer
- Jeff Dylan Graham as Dwayne
- Elissa Dowling as Betty
- David C. Hayes as JJ
- Daniel Schweiger as Brother Beau
- Christopher Raff as Timmy
- Chris Staviski as Skunk
- Jay Fields as Brother Zeke
- Troy Guthrie as Vance
- Gigi Fast Elk Porter as Mother Mary (as Gigi Bannister)

== Reception ==
HorrorNews.net reviewed the film, stating that it may be "offensive to some, trash to others" but that they enjoyed the movie and hoped that it would become a cult movie. ComingSoon.net also reviewed the movie, criticizing the length of time that the movie took to get to the main killings but stating that it "does a good job of recapturing the feel of late-'70s/early-'80s horror films".
