= Payback (1997 film) =

- DVD cover
- Directed by: Ken Cameron
- Written by: Dennis Nemec
- Produced by: Ed Asner; Ann Kindberg; Chris Kobin
- Starring: Mary Tyler Moore; Ed Asner
- Cinematography: James L. Carter
- Music by: Mark Snow
- Release date: 1997
- Running time: 94 minutes
- Country: United States
- Language: English

Payback is a 1997 thriller TV film starring Mary Tyler Moore and Ed Asner, marking the first time they were on screen together for 20 years. It aired on the ABC network in February.

== Plot ==
Kathryn Stanfill witnesses some police officers beating a suspect. After Internal Affairs investigator Jack Patkanis convinces her to testify, she and her family begin to be targeted by the police.

== Production ==
Filming began in Portland, Oregon in September 1996. In November, after seeing a rough cut, Moore "disowned" the film. By the time it aired she would not talk about it, citing a lawsuit coming after earlier negative comments.

== Cast ==
- Mary Tyler Moore as Kathryn Stanfill
- Ed Asner as Jack Patkanis
- Denis Arndt as Neil Stanfill
- Fredric Lehne as Sgt. Brian Kaleen
- Adam Scott as Adam Stanfill
- Beverly Sanders as Barbara

== Reception ==
The film received poor reviews. In the Los Angeles Times Steve Linan says "The persuasive Moore and Asner handle their roles in this watchable yet improbable thriller with ease, and it’s satisfying to see them together again after all these years, but the bottom line on “Payback” is that it may leave you feeling slightly shortchanged." Pete Schulberg in The Oregonian said "The story, while choppy and bordering on the simplistic, is engaging enough for wanting to spend part of an evening with Asner and Moore in unfamiliar roles. Unfortunately, their characters come up short in the depth department — or do I dare say it, lacking the necessary chemistry you'd expect in the TV reunion since The Beatles anthology." Ed Barks' review in the Anniston Star says, "But the plot begins congealing when it should thicken. And absent any galvanizing moments between the two stars, that's enough to make "Payback" an IOU." Hal Boedeker in the Daily Record writes "There's lots to criticize. Asner should have given himself more to do. The sociopathic cop (played by Fredric Lane) is too boldly evil to be believable. The gloomy film muffles whatever serious points it's trying to make about citizen responsibility or police not being above the law."
