= Searching for David's Heart =

1998 novel by Cherie Bennett

- Author: Cherie Bennett
- Language: English
- Genre: Young adult fiction
- Publisher: Scholastic
- Publication date: November 1998
- Publication place: United States
- Pages: 220 pgs.
- ISBN: 0-590-30673-1
- OCLC: 40161125

Searching for David's Heart is a 1998 young-adult novel by Cherie Bennett. The author is a screenwriter, novelist, playwright, and columnist for the San Diego Union-Tribune and other Copley newspapers.

== Plot summary ==
Darcy Deeton is a twelve-year-old girl who loves her older brother, David. After becoming jealous when he falls in love with Jayne Evans, Darcy inadvertently leads David to his death in a car accident. The Deetons decide to donate David's most important organ, his heart. Darcy is so guilt-ridden about his death that she is determined to find the person who has his heart so she can find some closure. Darcy embarks on a wild adventure with her best friend, Sam. She goes on a journey with Sam and finds the recipient of David's heart, Winston Pawling.

== Film adaptation ==
Searching for David's Heart was made into a made-for-TV movie that premiered on ABC Family in November 21, 2004. It is about a teenage girl, Darcy Deeton (played by Danielle Panabaker), who is dealing with the death of her brother, David. She goes on a journey with her best friend Sam (played by Ricky Ullman) to find the person who received David's heart. In the movie, Darcy's brother is killed after he is hit by a car on his sister Darcy's birthday. Darcy's mother and father decide to donate his heart to a transplant organization. She and her best friend Sam find out David and the one who received his heart are nothing alike, which becomes very devastating to Darcy. However, the experience helps bring the shattered family back together and start to heal. For her critically acclaimed performance, Panabaker won a Young Artist Award for Best Performance in a TV Movie, Miniseries or Special – Leading Young Actress. The film was directed by Paul Hoen. This marked the second collaboration between Panabaker and English after both previously starring in the 2004 TV movie Stuck in the Suburbs.

=== Cast ===
- Danielle Panabaker as Darcy Deeton
- Ricky Ullman as Sam Weiss, Darcy's best friend
- Jayne Brook as Claire Deeton, Darcy's mother
- Billy Aaron Brown as David Deeton, Darcy's older brother
- Jeffrey Nordling as Bill Deeton, Darcy's father
- Kendré Berry as Winston Pawling, Darcy & Sam's neighbor
- Corri English as Jayne Evans, David's girlfriend
