= Tell-Tale (film) =

Tell Tale
- Theatrical release poster
- Directed by: Michael Cuesta
- Written by: David Callaham
- Based on: "The Tell-Tale Heart" by Edgar Allan Poe
- Produced by: Ridley Scott; Tony Scott; Martin Shore; Christopher Tuffin; Michael Costigan
- Starring: Josh Lucas; Lena Headey; Brian Cox; Beatrice Miller; Ulrich Thomsen; Dallas Roberts
- Cinematography: Terry Stacey
- Edited by: Kane Platt; Billy Rich
- Music by: David Buckley
- Production companies: Social Capital Films; Scott Free Productions; Artina Films; Oceana Media Finance
- Distributed by: Genius Products
- Release date: April 24, 2009 (Tribeca)
- Running time: 93 minutes
- Countries: United Kingdom; United States
- Language: English
- Budget: $12 million

Tell-Tale is a 2009 science fiction horror film inspired by Edgar Allan Poe's 1843 short story "The Tell-Tale Heart". It is directed by Michael Cuesta and stars Josh Lucas, Lena Headey, and Brian Cox and is produced by Tony Scott and Ridley Scott. A man's recently transplanted heart leads him on a frantic search to find the donor's killer before a similar fate befalls him.

== Plot ==
In Providence, a husband and his wife die in a botched robbery; we see flickers of his last memories. His heart goes to Terry Bernard, a single father raising a girl with a rare degenerative disease. After the operation, Terry has flashes of memory from the last moments of the dead donor's life. Then, he recognizes one of the donor's killers and follows him into an alley. Within days, Terry becomes an unwilling avenger, with a police detective on his trail. Meanwhile, he begins a romance with his daughter's doctor, his moods complicated by memory flashes, the donor's deepening presence in both Terry's mind and body, and the unexplained bond among the donor's killers.

== Cast ==
- Josh Lucas as Terry Bernard
- Brian Cox as Detective Phillip Van Doran
- Lena Headey as Elizabeth Clemson
- Beatrice Miller as Angela Bernard
- Dallas Roberts as The Surgeon
- Ulrich Thomsen as Dr. Lethe
- Pablo Schreiber as Bernard Cochius
- Jamie Harrold as Kevin Stanovich
- Tom Riis Farrell as Legethon
- Julia Ryan as Museum Docent
- Michael K. Williams as Acherton
- Scott Winters as Dr. Averman
- John Timothy Botka as Police Officer
- Cassandra Fiering as Frances Vieillard
- Karan Lund as Nurse
- Allison Alexander as Reporter
- Peg Saurman Holzemer as Elderly woman in wheelchair
- Tom Kemp as Detective Hatzis

== Release ==
The film received a DVD and Blu-ray Disc release on 25 May 2010.
