= Raviv Ullman =

Israeli actor (born 1986)

- רביב אולמן
- Born: Raviv Chanan Ullman; 24 January 1986 (age 40); Eilat, Israel
- Other name: Ricky Ullman
- Occupation: Actor
- Years active: 1997–present
- Spouse: Julia Pott (m. 2023)
- Children: 1
- Relatives: Joseph Ehrenkranz (grandfather)

Raviv Chanan "Ricky" Ullman (Hebrew: רביב חנן "ריקי" אולמן; born 24 January 1986) is an Israeli actor. He is best known for playing Phil Diffy, the main character in the Disney Channel series Phil of the Future.

== Early life ==
Ullman was born in Eilat, Israel, to American Jewish parents Laura Ullman (née Ehrenkranz), a teacher, and Brian Ullman, a printer. He has a younger sister and younger brother named Tali and Nadav, respectively. After his first birthday, his family left their kibbutz in Israel for Norwalk, Connecticut, United States, and then to Fairfield, Connecticut, the following year.

Ullman was raised Orthodox Jewish. His maternal grandfather, Joseph Ehrenkranz, was an Orthodox rabbi in Stamford, Connecticut. Ullman is a first cousin, twice removed, of former Connecticut Senator Joe Lieberman. Lieberman's mother and Ullman's matrilineal great-grandmother were sisters.

Ullman taught himself how to play the trombone. Ullman was selected to attend the Hugh O'Brian Youth Leadership Foundation (HOBY) youth leadership program of Connecticut in March 2002 where he was selected as the "outstanding ambassador" enabling him to attend the HOBY World Leadership Congress in the summer of 2002. He went to Hillel Academy and is a graduate of Fairfield Warde High School. He was active in National Conference of Synagogue Youth.

== Career ==
=== Early career: 1997–2003 ===
Ullman's first professional role was as Louis in the national touring company of The King and I along with Jesse McCartney. Other productions he worked on include Peter Pan at the Polka Dot Playhouse, The Music Man with the New England Repertory Company, and Just People at the Long Wharf Theatre. He received a 1998–1999 Best Actor nomination from the Connecticut Critics' Awards for his character Stanley in Stamford Theater Work's A Rosen by Any Other Name. He had small roles in film and television shows, notably portraying Christopher Knight in the 2000 movie Growing Up Brady.

=== Television: 2004–2009 ===
==== Phil of the Future and Disney ====
Ullman is best known for his starring role as Phil Diffy, a teen from the year 2121 on Disney Channel's Phil of the Future, a series that debuted June 2004. He also starred as Roscoe in Disney's made-for-television film Pixel Perfect. During this period, Ullman appeared in other Disney Channel programming, such as a guest role on That's So Raven, and was an identified member of the Disney Channel Circle of Stars, appearing with other members of the Circle in the music video for "A Dream is a Wish Your Heart Makes," where he sang as well as played the drums.

==== Rita Rocks and other television and film ====
In 2004, Ullman starred as Sam in ABC Family's television film Searching for David's Heart. He appeared in a string of independent films including The Big Bad Swim and Driftwood (2006), Normal Adolescent Behavior (2007), and Prom Wars (2008). During this period, he guest-starred in TV shows like Big Love and Law & Order: Special Victims Unit.

Ullman was cast as Kip in the Lifetime sitcom Rita Rocks, which premiered in 2009. His character was the drummer in the titular character's band and her daughter's boyfriend. The show was canceled after two seasons.

While Ullman previously went by the stage name Ricky, he started using his real name in 2006 when he guest-starred on an episode of House and continued to use Raviv on all projects since.

==== Music ====
In June 2006, Ullman and a few of his friends created parody hip-hop music videos under the name the Webee Boys. In December 2006, Ullman met actor Douglas Smith of Big Love fame and together they formed a band called Goodbye Ian. The group expanded to seven people and later changed its name to His Orchestra. Ullman plays drums and glockenspiel in the band, which released its debut album, Field Guide to the Wilds, on 24 February 2009.

=== Post-television career: 2009–present ===
==== Theater ====
From January 2012 to 24 March 2012, Ullman starred as the character Alex in the New Group's production of Russian Transport Off-Broadway in New York. On 30 April 2012, it was announced that Ullman joined the cast of Alena Smith's new Off-Broadway play The Bad Guys. It began performances on 22 May at the McGinn/Cazale Theater on the Upper West Side in New York City. In 2014, Ullman acted opposite of Holly Hunter and Richard Chamberlain in the first revival of Sticks and Bones. Sticks and Bones opened 6 November 2014 and closed 14 December 2014.

Ullman starred in the 2017 benefit play Right Before I Go at The Town Hall.

In 2018, Ullman performed in the Roundabout Theatre Company Underground's production of Usual Girls by Ming Peiffer.

==== Music ====
Ullman was a musician with Soko on her 2012 tour. Ullman was a member of the band Reputante, which released their 2013 debut on Julian Casablancas' record label Cult Records. He departed the band sometime in 2015. With Reputante members James Levy and Jimmy Giannopoulos, Ullman helped form the band Lolawolf with actress Zoë Kravitz. He left Lolawolf before the release of their first full-length record, Calm Down, in October 2014.

==== Filmmaking ====
In October 2016, Ullman announced his project Standing Ground, a documentary that explores the Standing Rock Sioux Nation, the North Dakota Access Pipeline and the fossil fuels industry. Production of the film took place throughout 2017.

==== Podcasting ====
Ullman, along with Rabbi Adam Greenwald, hosts The Study, a podcast focused on exploring, questioning, and applying the Torah. The trailer was released in late September 2020, and the first episode came out on 2 October 2020.

== Personal life ==
Ullman is an environmentalist and has called himself "a fourth generation activist". He works with TAP (Teens AIDS Prevention).

Ullman lived in Brooklyn, New York, until 2020, then he moved to Los Angeles, California.

On 13 May 2023, Ullman married British animator Julia Pott.

== Filmography ==
=== Film ===
Year	Film	Role	Notes
1998	Crossfire	Aziz	
2000	Growing Up Brady	Christopher Knight	TV movie
2001	The Boys of Sunset Ridge	John Burroughs at 13	
2004	Pixel Perfect	Roscoe	TV movie
2004	Searching for David's Heart	Sam Weiss	TV movie
2004	Costume Party Capers: The Incredibles	Himself	TV movie
2005	Kim Possible Movie: So the Drama	Eric	Voice
2005	Totally Suite New Year's Eve	Himself	TV movie
2006	The Big Bad Swim	Hunter McCarthy	
2006	Driftwood	David Forrester	
2006	That Guy	Logan	TV movie
2007	Normal Adolescent Behavior	Price	
2007	The Violin	David	Short
2008	Prom Wars	Percy Collins	
2008	Mother Goose Parade	Himself	
2010	How to Make Love to a Woman	Scott Conners	
2010	The Trouble with Cali	Lois	
2011	A Sense of Humor	Laughing Man	Short
2013	Contest	Rip	
2026	Drag	—N/a	Director and writer
TBA	The Other Side	Jacob	In Development
TBA	Spring Break '83	Billy	Filming completed in 2007; release postponed.

=== Television ===
Year	Show	Role	Notes
2002	Guiding Light	Jacky	Episode dated 16 May 2002
2002	Law & Order: Criminal Intent	1st Boy	Episode: "Crazy" (13 January 2002)
2004–2006	Phil of the Future	Phil Diffy	Lead role
2004	Law & Order: Special Victims Unit	Danny Spencer	Episode: "Obscene" (12 October 2004)
2005	That's So Raven	Jake Haskell	"On Top of Old Oaky" (22 April 2005)
2006	Big Love	Donna's Makeout Partner	Episode: "Eclipse" (2 April 2006)
2006	House	Jeremy	Episode: "Fools for Love" (31 October 2006)
2007	Cold Case	Phil DiPreta, '98	Episode: "That Woman" (30 September 2007)
2007	Phineas and Ferb	Additional Voices	Episode: "Rollercoaster/Candace Loses Her Head" (17 August 2007)
2008	The Middleman	Derek	Episode: "The Obsolescent Cryogenic Meltdown" (11 August 2008)
2008–2009	Rita Rocks	Kip	Main cast; 40 episodes
2011	Criminal Minds: Suspect Behavior	Ben	Episode: "The Time Is Now" (4 May 2011)
2015	Broad City	Reginald Carolla	Episode: "In Heat" (14 January 2015)
2018	Strangers	Rory	Recurring; 3 episodes

=== Stage ===
Year	Play	Role	Venue	Notes
1997	The King and I	Louis Leonowens	National tour	
1999	A Rosen By Any Other Name	Stanley		
2005	Dead End	Tommy	Ahmanson Theatre	
2012	Russian Transport	Alex	The New Group @ Theatre Row	
2012	The Bad Guys	Paul	McGinn/Cazale Theatre	
2014	The Loneliness of the Long Distance Runner	Gunthorpe	Stage 2	
2014	Deathtrap	Clifford Anderson	Bucks County Playhouse	
2014	Sticks and Bones	Rick	The Pershing Square Signature Center	
2015	Bad Jews	Jonah	Geffen Playhouse	
2015	Choice	Hunter	Huntington Theatre	
2018	Right Before I Go		The Town Hall	One-night benefit
2018	Usual Girls	Rory	Roundabout Underground Black Box Theatre	
2024	Galilee, 34	Saul of Tarsus	South Coast Repertory	World Premiere
