= Hood of Horror =

2007 film directed by Stacy Title

- Directed by: Stacy Title
- Written by: Jacob Hair; Chris Kobin; Jonathan McHugh; Tim Sullivan
- Produced by: Jonathan McHugh; Martin Shore; Christopher Tuffin; Tim Sullivan; Ted Chung
- Starring: Snoop Dogg; Ernie Hudson; Danny Trejo; Anson Mount; Daniella Alonso; Brande Roderick; Aries Spears; Diamond Dallas Page; Jason Alexander; Billy Dee Williams
- Cinematography: Claudio Rocha
- Edited by: Luis Colina; Jason Resmer
- Music by: Patrick Copeland
- Production companies: Social Capital Films; BloodWorks; Snoopadelic Films
- Distributed by: Xenon Pictures
- Release dates: June 27, 2006 (Los Angeles Film Festival); November 4, 2006 (United States)
- Running time: 84 minutes
- Country: United States
- Language: English
- Budget: $5 million
- Box office: $25,900

Hood of Horror (a.k.a. Snoop Dogg's Hood of Horror) is a 2006 American comedy horror anthology film directed by Stacy Title, and written by Jonathan McHugh, Tim Sullivan, Jacob Hair and Chris Kobin.

The film consists of three different short stories, each set within the same inner-city neighbourhood, and which are presented within a framing narrative featuring Snoop Dogg as a local gang member-turned-spirit, responsible for deciding where those featured in the short stories will go to in the afterlife. The film's ensemble cast also includes Danny Trejo, Daniella Alonso, Ernie Hudson, Anson Mount, Jason Alexander and Billy Dee Williams.

The film was the "secret" ninth film screened in the 8 Films to Die For film festival on November 19, 2006. It opened worldwide in theaters on May 4, 2007.

== Plot ==
=== Animated Prologue ===
Devon (Snoop Dogg), a local gangbanger, gets involved in a vehicular shoot-out with a rival gang in a car chase that travels throughout the neighborhood. After successfully managing to kill the leader of the gang, Liore, however, Devon discovers that his little sister was killed by a stray bullet he fired during the shoot-out.

Devastated after being disowned by his mother, Devon decides to take a walk through the neighborhood by himself, only to abruptly encounter Liore, who has been resurrected as some sort of demon. Liore says he can bring Devon's sister back, but only if Devon trades his own life by slitting his own throat. Devon proceeds to do so, and Liore keeps up his end of the deal.

Impressed with Devon's willingness to redeem himself, Liore resurrects Devon and sears a "HOH" symbol on the back of Devon's neck, making him a "Hound of Hell". Liore then tells Devon that he has now granted him the ability to decide where people will go in the afterlife, and instructs him to use it responsibly.

Throughout the rest of the film, Devon serves as the film's narrator, speaking directly to the audience and frequently interjecting himself into the film's three main stories.

=== "Crossed Out" ===
Posie Santana is a young local graffiti artist who has been commissioned by Pastor Charlie to create a flower mural for the neighbourhood on the wall of the local high school. However, she also displays a firm hatred against gang members, following a traumatic childhood incident in which she witnessed her father murder her mother before killing himself.

One day, after insulting a trio of gang members for covering up her tag, Posie is chased throughout a rundown section of the neighbourhood, only to suddenly get kidnapped by a mysterious derelict, who inks a tattoo on her arm and tells her to "behold the power that [she] now carries". The next morning, whilst wandering the neighbourhood, Posie notices a tag spray-painted on the wall belonging to "Fatcap", one of the gang members she had insulted the day prior. Out of spite, she spray-paints an "X" over the tag. Later, however, Posie learns that Fatcap was killed after his gun discharged in his pocket.

Realising that she now has power over life and death, Posie decides to get back at the other two gang members, Streako and Nib, by crossing out their tags, causing them both to die in similarly bizarre freak accidents. Posie then goes on to cross out a few more tags that she finds.

That night, Posie goes to start working on the mural she promised for Charlie. Suddenly, however, the derelict appears, and accuses Rosie of 'misusing her power'. Posie gets defensive, assuming that the derelict (who, by this point, is revealed to be another Hound of Hell) had given her her powers in order to help him "clean up the streets". However, the derelict instead tells her that she was supposed to use her powers to paint her mural, which would've thus brought peace and harmony to the neighbourhood. Furious at her for having failed, the derelict summons the zombies of Fatcap, Nib and Streako, who corner her against the wall and ruthlessly kill her by impaling her spray can into her head.

The next morning, Pastor Charlie (believing Posie kept her promise) unveils the flower mural to his congregation, which, unbeknownst to anyone (aside from Devon and the derelict, who are silently watching on), is actually made of the bloody remains of Posie herself.

=== "The Scumlord" ===
Tex Woods Jr., a racist Southern yuppie, and his similarly racist girlfriend Tiffany are at the will reading for Tex Jr.'s father Tex Woods Sr., a former commanding officer who "died mysteriously" (in reality, he was run down by his son as revenge for trying to "shut [him] out" of the will). During the reading, Tex and Tiffany are told that, in order to receive their share of the inheritance, they will have to spend one year living with four black Vietnam War vets who served under and were friends with Tex Sr. Tex is dismayed at first, but then realizes that all the inheritance will go to him after the Vets pass away.

Tex and Tiffany introduce themselves to the Vets—Roscoe, Jackson, Stevens and Vance, and Tex quickly gets to using his father's relationship with the Vets to his advantage; ordering them to demolish their separate bedrooms upstairs in favor of constructing an expensive master bedroom for him and Tiffany (thus forcing the Vets to sleep in the basement), lying about the Vets going over their "grocery allowance" and forcefully lowering it (with the hope that it will make them starve to death), and deliberately not paying the heating bills.

Some time passes, and Wanda, a young nurse and friend of the Vets, expresses anger over Tex's mistreatment of the Vets, especially given how it is severely impacting Stevens's health. She decides to personally confront Tex and Tiffany, threatening to call the authorities, but Tex ends up sexually assaulting her, before Tiffany suffocates her to death with a pillow. That night, with Stevens's condition getting worse, Roscoe tries to confront Tex and Tiffany as well, only to get rebuffed. Shortly after, Roscoe discovers Wanda's body in the freezer, and then discovers that Stevens has died from his illnesses.

Furious, the vets decide to get revenge, breaking into Tex's room and beating him unconscious. After forcing Tex to endure Chinese water torture, they bound him to Stevens' wheelchair and force him to witness them kill Tiffany by using a vacuum to force-feed her the caviar she was buying with the Vet's stolen money, ultimately causing her stomach to explode. The vets then send Tex rolling down the stairs in the wheelchair, where he gets his neck impaled on his own spiky hood ornament. Having gotten their money back, the Vets all hold a Christmas party in honour of Stevens.

=== "Rapsody Askew" ===
Aspiring hip-hop/rap artist Martin (nicknamed SOD, an acronym for "succeed or die"), prays to God in a church, promising to serve him eternally and become a better person if he helps him succeed in the music industry. Mere minutes later, SOD runs into another aspiring musician named Quon, and the two strike up a close friendship after Quon shows off his composition talents.

Some time passes, and SOD is shown to have earned huge success, winning a Breakthrough Artist award during a ceremony, although it is mentioned that Quon has died at this point. Following the ceremony, SOD holds a party in his VIP room to celebrate with his entourage. Suddenly, however, SOD encounters another Hound of Hell named Clara, and his entourage mysteriously disappears from the room. Clara reprimands SOD for breaking his promise to God, and forces him to watch a selection of videos from throughout the previous year.

The first video displays SOD and Quon in a meeting with their record dealer, during which SOD tries to get the executives to buy him expensive jewelry and cars, and leaves the room in anger when his requests get turned down. Quon awkwardly tries to brush SOD's behaviour aside, and the dealer, frustrated with SOD's attitude, tries offering Quon a solo career. Quon refuses, however, and as the video ends, Clara scolds SOD for not appreciating Quon's contributions nor his dedication to keeping the team together.

The next video brings up a scandal involving SOD having sex with a girl who turned out to be underage, which caused further strain in his relationship with Quon. The final video shows the night that Quon died, after being shot by a gunman during a general store robbery. After the video ends, Clara summons a zombified Quon before leaving him in the room with the horrified SOD. The undead Quon reveals that the general store robbery was actually set up by SOD as a way for him to get rid of Quon and gain all the fame for himself; SOD had been wearing a bulletproof vest during the attack, and the gunman had actually been SOD's bodyguard Jersey in disguise. Despite this, however, SOD continually insists that he doesn't regret his actions.

Jersey suddenly enters the room, and gets killed by Quon in front of SOD. Due to him being the only one able to see Quon, SOD ends up being framed for Jersey's murder after his groupies walk in. Realizing his career is over, SOD decides to "go out in a blaze of glory" and starts firing at the police officers who get brought in, getting gunned down in an elevator for doing so.

=== Epilogue ===
Devon and his demon servant Half Pint gather the souls of Posie, Tex Jr., Tiffany and SOD, before taking them onto an elevator that rapidly descends them all into Hell. Devon informs the audience that all four individuals had the potential to do good, but instead chose to do evil for the sake of their own needs. He then warns the audience to be wary of their own actions that ride the line between good and evil.

== Cast ==
Intro & Wraparounds:

- Snoop Dogg as Devon
- Gabriel Pimentel as "Half Pint"
- Hawthorne James as Liore (voice)
- Tayshaun Prince as "Footloose"
- Stephanie Leon as Young Demon Girl
- Robyn Shore as Gucci Demon
- Mateo Baker as Stroking Demon

Crossed Out:

- Daniella Alonso as Posie Santana
- Danny Trejo as Derelict
- Teyo Johnson as "Streako"
- Noel Gugliemi as Francis "Fatcap"
- Jeffrey Licon as "Nib"
- Andrea Leon as Mrs. Santana
- Justin Fargas as Mr. Santana
- Cleo King as Miss Williams
- Billy Dee Williams as Pastor Charlie

The Scumlord:

- Anson Mount as Tex Jr.
- Brande Roderick as Tiffany
- Chuck Hicks as Tex Sr., Vietnam Veteran
- Ernie Hudson as Roscoe Lee
- Richard Gant as Jackson
- Tucker Smallwood as Stevens
- L. Kenneth Richardson as Vance
- Sydney Tamiia Poitier as Wanda
- Cricket The Chihuahua as Pootie The Dog

Rhapsody Askew:

- Pooch Hall as "SOD"
- Aries Spears as "Quon"
- Diamond Dallas Page as "Jersey"
- Lin Shaye as Clara
- Method Man as himself
- Lamar Odom as himself
- Deance Wyatt as Kid
- Jason Alexander as British Record Mogul
- Jonathan McHugh as Record Executive
- Martin Shore as Record Executive
- Gabriel Alexander as Executive Assistant
- Jillian DiFusco as Hot Girl
- Shana Montanez as Groupie
- Dawn Gonzalez as Groupie

== Production ==
The animated segments were produced by the Japanese studio Madhouse.

== Soundtrack listing ==
1. Snoop Dogg - "Welcome to the Hood"
2. Flii Stylz - "Beaztly"
3. Al Kapone - "My Dead Homie"
4. Rainman - "Out Here"
5. Snoop Dogg feat. Young Walt, Terrace Martin and Tiffany Fox - "Shake That Shit"
6. The North Mississippi Allstars - "Goin Back to Dixie"
7. Percy Sledge - "24-7-365"
8. Rednex - "Cotton Eye Joe"
9. C-Ride feat. Dre - "Get Ghost"
10. Young Hugg and CJ - "Da Hood"
11. Ill Bill feat. Skam2 - "Thousand to M's"
12. Flii Stylz feat. Dap Daniel - "Clownin' Out"
13. Lordikim - "Stay Up"
14. Cool and Dre feat. Aries Spears and Pooch Hall - "Sod and Quon's Theme (Dramacydal)"
15. Al Kapone - "Derelict's Lair"

(Not on CD) Tangled Thoughts - "I'm A Rebel"
