= 2001 Maniacs: Field of Screams =

- Promotional poster
- Directed by: Tim Sullivan
- Written by: Tim Sullivan; Chris Kobin; Christopher Tuffin
- Produced by: Christopher Tuffin; Mike Greene; Martin Shore; J.D. Lifshitz; Jimmy Evans
- Starring: Bill Moseley; Lin Shaye; Christa Campbell; Andrea Leon; Nivek Ogre
- Cinematography: Mike Karasick
- Edited by: Adam Robitel
- Music by: Patrick Copeland; Clifford Allen Wagner
- Production companies: BloodWorks; Social Capital Films; Ambergreen Entertainment; Tax Credit Finance
- Distributed by: First Look Studios (US), Anchor Bay Entertainment (UK)
- Release date: February 27, 2010 (Fright Fest)
- Running time: 84 minutes
- Country: United States
- Language: English

2001 Maniacs: Field of Screams is a 2010 comedy horror film written and directed by Tim Sullivan. It is a sequel to his earlier film 2001 Maniacs. The story and characters are based on Herschell Gordon Lewis' original film Two Thousand Maniacs. The film stars Bill Moseley, Lin Shaye, Christa Campbell, Andrea Leon, and Nivek Ogre.

== Plot ==
When this year's round of unsuspecting Northerners fail to show up for their annual Guts N’ Glory Jubilee because the Feds are investigating the disappearances of Northerners over the years, the residents of Pleasant Valley take their twisted carnival on the road and head to Iowa, where they encounter spoiled heiresses, Rome and Tina Sheraton, and the cast and crew of their Road Rascals reality show. They begin killing the cast and crew.

At the end, the residents of Pleasant Valley get an idea to use a TV commercial to lure in their victims.

== Cast ==
- Bill Moseley as Mayor George W. Buckman
- Trevor Wright as Falcon
- Lin Shaye as Granny Boone
- Christa Campbell as Milk Maiden
- Ahmed Best as Crow
- Adam Robitel as Lester
- Nivek Ogre as Harper Alexander
- Andrea Leon as Val Turner

== Production ==
Unlike the first film Raw Nerve was not involved with the production.

On October 21, 2009 2001 Maniacs: The Beverly Hellbillys was retitled to 2001 Maniacs: Field of Screams announced Tim Sullivan in Santa Monica, California a short time before to movie start on American Film Market.

== Release ==
The finished film was unveiled at 2010's FRIGHT FEST in Glasgow, Scotland on February 26 and three other film festivals in the UK. The DVD release in the United Kingdom is set with the July 5, 2010. The domestic Blu-ray release, with the unrated version is set for the July 20, 2010. The film had his US premiere on April 29, 2010 as part of the Texas Frightmare Weekend and is acquired by First Look Studios. The West Coast release is set for the July 17, 2010. The New Jersey release on July 17, 2010 was hosted by Tim Sullivan.

== Soundtrack ==
"Mayor Buckman" actor Bill Moseley had a duet with Rani Sharone as Spider Mountain on the soundtrack.

=== Track list ===
- Clifford Allen Wagner – "Killers on the Highway"
- Spider Mountain – "Lord, Let Me Help You Decide Who to Kill"
- Clifford Allen Wagner and Ahmed Best – "The South's Gonna Rise Again"
- Clifford Allen Wagner and Ahmed Best – "Rot in Hell"
- Clifford Allen Wagner and Ahmed Best – "Hey Hey Howdy Howdy Hey"
- Clifford Allen Wagner and Ahmed Best – "Fun, Games and Feastin'"
- Patrick Copeland & Lin Shaye – "Cannibals"
- Clifford Allen Wagner and Ahmed Best – "Building From the Ground Up"
- Psycho Charger – "The South's Gonna Rise Again"

== Reception ==
Scott Weinberg of Fearnet called it "a merciless chore to get through." R. L. Shaffer of IGN rated it 3/10 stars and called it derivative and dull. David Harley of Bloody Disgusting rated it 0.5/5 stars and described it as "a film which makes absolutely no sense, has no real plot, and is peppered with jokes that seem to be going for being merely crude and offensive rather than funny."
