= Slasher Sale =

Slasher Sale is a promotional event used by car dealerships to sell pre-owned vehicles, by drastically reducing pricing for a limited time.

The Slasher Sale is an automotive promotional event popular with dealerships in the United States, Mexico and Canada. "Slasher Sales" or "Slash-It" Sales were started circa 1989 and since have gained the reputation as being the most profitable automotive "themed event" for new and used car dealerships. There are a number of promotional companies that claim to be the originator of the Slasher Sale, but the Eleventh Circuit Federal Court (case number: Civil #04-00561 HG-KSC) has upheld Caliber Promotions' claim that the term, "Slasher Sale" or "Slash-It" Sale is trademarked.

== Marketing techniques ==
The majority of Slasher Sales use a variety of advertising and marketing techniques to create a high energy environment, in a carnival style atmosphere. To draw large crowds for the event, low prices are advertised along with free gifts and prizes using traditional and modern advertising mediums. For example, a Slasher Sale may be promoted by:

Traditional marketing:

- direct mailers and postcard offerings
- radio spots and live broadcasting
- television commercials
- newspaper advertising
- onsite flyers at participating dealership
- sign walkers
- billboards

Modern marketing:

- online banners
- social media
- email newsletters
- websites

== How a Slasher Sale works ==
The marketing strategy for a "Slasher Sale" or "Slash-It" Sale revolves around slashing prices on surplus, pre-owned inventory. All vehicles will be on display in a secured area at the dealership. However, in many cases a group of dealerships will collectively participate in a Slasher Sale that takes place in an offsite area; sometimes advertised as a, "Tent Event." In either case (onsite or offsite) on each day of the event, all vehicles will be opened so buyers may inspect the vehicles for one hour prior to price slashing.

On the windshield of each vehicle the pre-selling price will be displayed. When the sale begins, whoever is sitting behind the wheel in the vehicle when the posted price is slashed will have the first chance to purchase the vehicle at the slashed price. The price of the vehicle will be slashed one time. Typically, the dealership will have one to three pre-owned vehicles available at the $88 price.

The Slasher Sale, or Slash-It Sale event is not limited to customers will good credit, all credit situations are welcome. Financing and approval is done on site with a paycheck stub or proof of income and a utility bill. The customer should be prepared for on the spot delivery.

== Federal Court Documents ==
Civil #04-00561 HG-KSC
