= Total Community Action =

Total Community Action, Inc. (TCA) is a non-profit community agency in New Orleans founded in 1964 to address the needs of disadvantaged residents.

TCA services include early childhood development, utility assistance, home weatherization, job counseling and guidance, transportation for the elderly and disabled, food distribution, youth work experiences, and a telephone tape library.

TCA administers a Head Start program. Recent federal grants to TCA include $300,000 in 2004 from the Administration for Children and Families for an Assets for Independence program, which provides matching contributions intended for post-secondary education, business capitalization, or homeownership.
