= Lin Shaye =

American actress (born 1943)

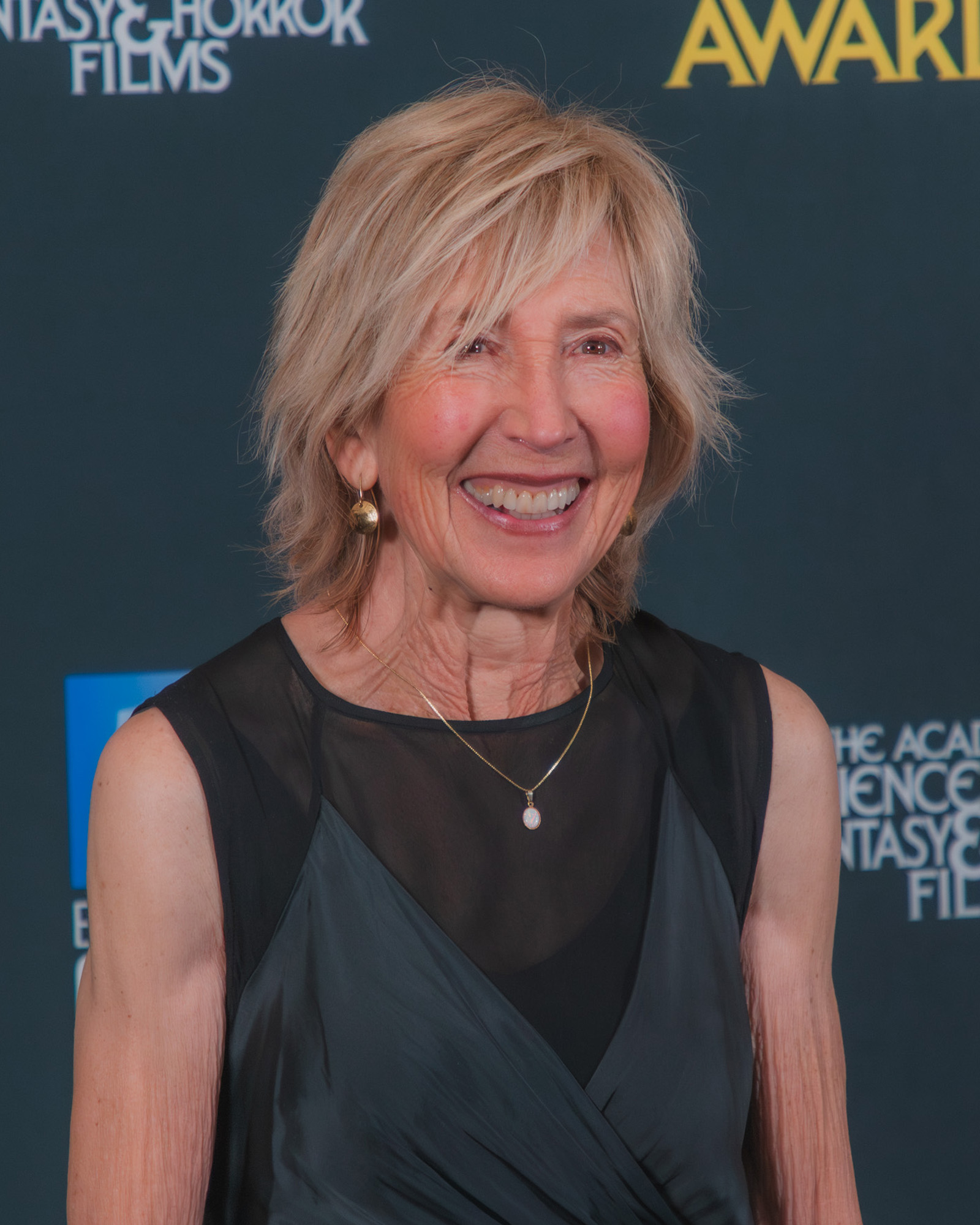
- Shaye in 2026
- Born: October 12, 1943 (age 83); Detroit, Michigan, U.S.
- Education: University of Michigan
- Occupation: Actress
- Years active: 1975–present
- Spouse(s): Marshall Rubinoff (m. 19??; died 1968) Clayton Landey (m. 1988; div. 2003)
- Children: 1
- Relatives: Robert Shaye (brother)

Lin Shaye (born October 12, 1943) is an American actress. In a career spanning over 50 years, Shaye has appeared in more than a hundred feature films. She is regarded as a scream queen due to her roles in various horror productions, which include the films Alone in the Dark (1982), A Nightmare on Elm Street (1984), Critters (1986) and its sequel Critters 2: The Main Course (1988), Amityville: A New Generation (1993), Wes Craven's New Nightmare (1994), Dead End (2003), 2001 Maniacs (2005) and its sequel 2001 Maniacs: Field of Screams (2010), Ouija (2014) and its prequel Ouija: Origin of Evil (2016), Tales of Halloween (2015), Abattoir (2016), The Final Wish (2018), Room for Rent (2019), The Grudge (2020), Ted Bundy: American Boogeyman (2021), and the Insidious film series (2010–2026).

Lin Shaye is also well known for her comedic roles in numerous films by the Farrelly brothers, including Dumb and Dumber (1994), Kingpin (1996), There's Something About Mary (1998), Detroit Rock City (1999), Me, Myself & Irene (2000), Stuck on You (2003), and The Three Stooges (2012).

== Early life ==
Lin Shaye was born on October 12, 1943 in Detroit, Michigan. She is the sister of film executive Robert Shaye. Her family is Jewish; her mother was born in Russia, and her paternal grandparents were from Romania, and settled in Michigan.

Shaye studied art history at the University of Michigan before she moved to New York to appear in Off Broadway productions. In 1977, she moved to Los Angeles to pursue her acting career.

== Career ==
In 1975, Shaye made her film debut with a small role in Hester Street, followed by small roles in several movies and television shows. In 1978, she appeared in the Jack Nicholson-directed Western Goin' South. "I got a call saying, 'Mr. Nicholson wants you in Mexico for two weeks for this small role called The Parasol Lady'. It was so much fun." She has since appeared in a large number of character roles.

From 1980 to 1996, she has appeared in four films by director Walter Hill: The Long Riders, Brewster's Millions, Extreme Prejudice and Last Man Standing. In 1984, Shaye played a teacher in A Nightmare on Elm Street. The film was distributed by New Line Cinema, the company founded by the actress' older brother Robert Shaye. She has admitted the family connection helped her a little. "My brother said, 'Put my sister in your movie!'" She had roles in other horror films around the same time including Alone in the Dark (1982), Critters (1986) and its sequel Critters 2: The Main Course (1988), Amityville: A New Generation (1993), and Wes Craven's New Nightmare (1994).

In 1994, Shaye had her breakout comedy role of Mrs. Neugeboren in the Farrelly Brothers' Dumb and Dumber. The film was released on December 16, 1994. Despite receiving mixed reviews from critics, it was a commercial success and developed a cult following in the years since its release. The Farrellys then subsequently cast her as Woody Harrelson's gruesome landlady in 1996's Kingpin. Next they gave her a role as Cameron Diaz's character's overtanned neighbor Magda in the 1998 hit There's Something About Mary. The Farrellys said, 'We want her to look like an old leather bag,' " recalled Shaye. "It was four hours every time they put on the makeup." The film was a sleeper hit, and was the highest-grossing comedy of 1998 in North America as well as the fourth-highest-grossing film of the year. For her performance, Shaye was nominated for a Blockbuster Entertainment Award for Favorite Supporting Actress – Comedy. She followed this with 1999's Detroit Rock City as an uptight mother waging a personal war against the band Kiss. She had a role in the Farrelly Brothers' 2000 film Me, Myself & Irene, however her scenes were cut, but appeared as Makeup Babe in their 2003 film Stuck on You.

In 2003, Shaye appeared alongside Cuba Gooding Jr. and Horatio Sanz in Boat Trip as Sonya, a horny tanning coach who becomes obsessed with Sanz's character. That same year she co-starred with Ray Wise and Alexandra Holden in the cult horror film Dead End as Laura Harrington; Shaye received positive reviews and was nominated for a Fangoria Chainsaw Award for Best Supporting Actress. In 2004, she starred as Jenny Buono, the mother of 1970s Los Angeles serial killer Angelo Buono in The Hillside Strangler.

In 2005, Shaye appeared in the film 2001 Maniacs as Granny Boone and again in the sequel 2001 Maniacs: Field of Screams. The next year she had a supporting role in the thriller Snakes on a Plane, playing Grace, the senior flight attendant who acts as the flight's purser. In 2007, she appeared in the short films Sponsored By, Under The Gun, Midnight Snack, Time Upon a Once, Old Home Boyz, Backseat Driving Test, and The Yes Men which were directed by contestants on the reality show On the Lot.

In 2011, Shaye played medium Elise, a supporting role, in the horror film Insidious. "It scared the daylights out of me," said Shaye. "I read it in bed, and when I finished, I took it downstairs and locked it in the closet. I really was chilled to the bone by the story." The film was released on April 1, 2011, and received positive reviews. It grossed a total of $97,009,150 worldwide. It was the most profitable film of 2011. Shaye received positive reviews and was nominated for a Fangoria Chainsaw Award for Best Supporting Actress, a Fright Meter Award for Best Supporting Actress, and a Saturn Award for Best Supporting Actress. In 2012, she again appeared in a Farrelly Brothers film as a nurse in The Three Stooges. In November 2012, it was officially announced that Shaye, Patrick Wilson, and Rose Byrne would reprise their roles from the first film in Insidious: Chapter 2. The film was released September 13, 2013. It received mixed reviews and was a box office success.

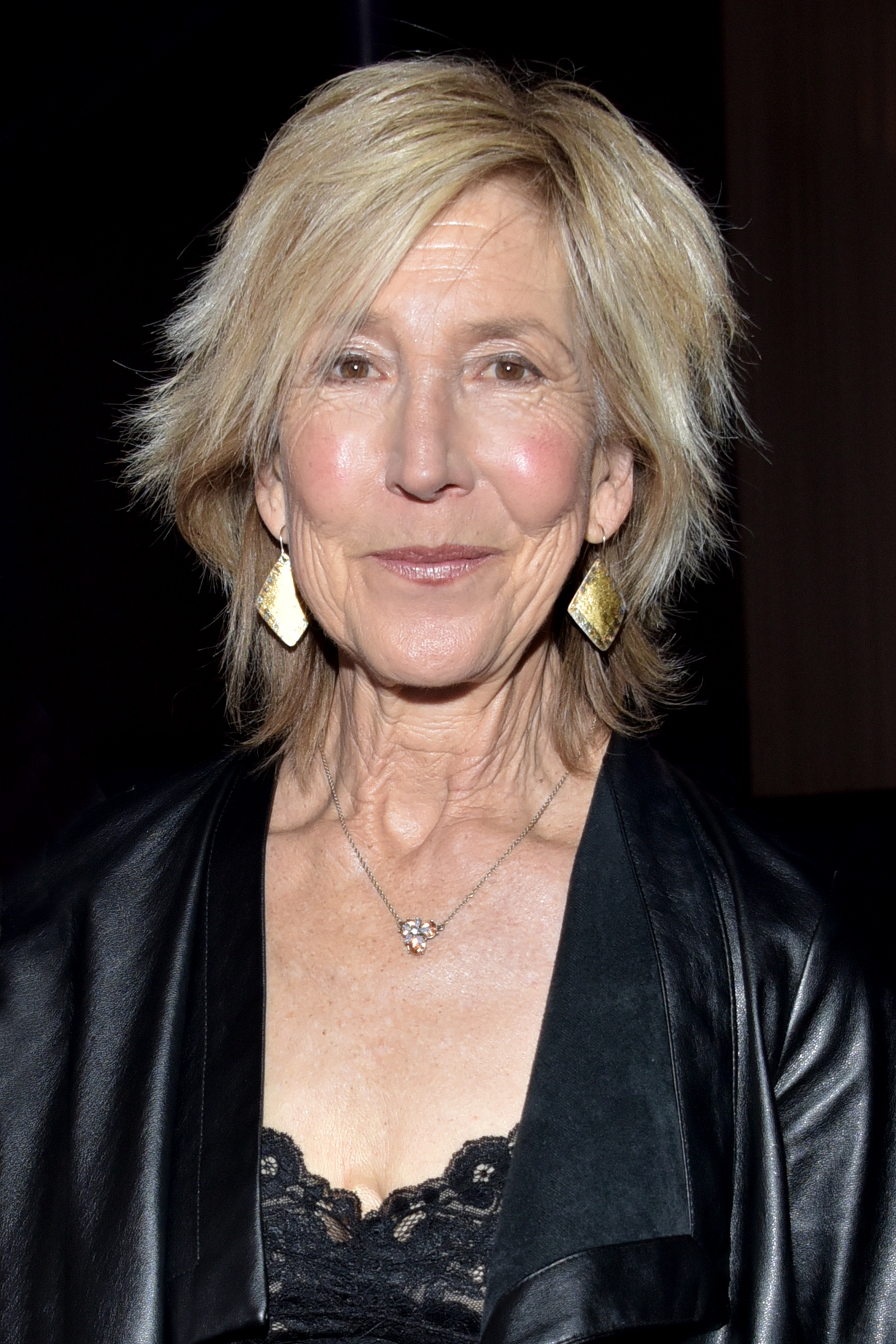
Shaye in 2017

Shaye returned as Elise, this time in the leading role, in the third and fourth installments of the Insidious franchise, Insidious: Chapter 3 (2015) and Insidious: The Last Key (2018). Speaking of the role in the third film, Shaye said "Elise has become this sort of bad ass in this installment, I can't even tell you how much fun that was for me. I'm not taking names!" Insidious: Chapter 3 received a mixed response from critics, and Shaye's performance was well-received by critics and audiences. Rotten Tomatoes lists a 59% approval rating, with the site's critical consensus reading "Insidious: Chapter 3 isn't as terrifying as the original, although it boasts surprising thematic depth and is enlivened by another fine performance from Lin Shaye." A writer from The Wrap opined that Shaye "shines" in the film. The Oakland Post Online said, "Shaye is able to give the film most of its heart. Many of the horror scenes rely on her to be either the calming voice or the badass heroine, and Shaye plays both of those roles perfectly," also adding, "Insidious: Chapter 3 could have been a disaster, but thanks to some genuinely scary moments and veteran acting from Lin Shaye, the film is able to be mostly enjoyable." Later horror films in which Shay appeared include Ouija (2014) and its prequel Ouija: Origin of Evil (2016), Tales of Halloween (2015), Abattoir (2016), The Final Wish (2018), Room for Rent (2019), The Grudge (2020), and Ted Bundy: American Boogeyman (2021).

In 2020, Shaye received the Daytime Emmy Award for Outstanding Guest Performer in a Digital Drama Series for her guest role on the dark comedy web series EastSiders.

== Personal life ==
Shaye has been married twice. Her first husband, writer and musician Marshall Rubinoff, died in 1968 at age 24. In 1988, she married actor Clayton Landey, with whom she appeared in 2002's Wish You Were Dead. The couple had one child before divorcing in 2003.

== Filmography ==
=== Film ===
Year	Title	Role	Notes
1975	Hester Street	Whore	
1977	A Secret Space	Amy	
1978	Goin' South	Parasol lady	
1980	The Long Riders	Kate	
1982	Alone in the Dark	Receptionist at haven	
1982	Jekyll and Hyde... Together Again	Nurse with telegram	
1984	A Nightmare on Elm Street	Teacher	
1985	Brewster's Millions	Journalist at rally	
1986	Critters	Sally	
1987	My Demon Lover	Anemic counter girl	
1987	Extreme Prejudice	Employment office clerk	
1987	Slam Dance	Librarian	
1987	The Hidden	Carol Miller	
1987	The Running Man	Propaganda officer	
1988	Critters 2: The Main Course	Sal	
1988	Lucky Stiff	Bratty kid's mom	
1990	Book of Love	Mrs. Flynn	
1990	Pump Up the Volume	PTA parent #3	
1992	Roadside Prophets	Celeste	
1993	Loaded Weapon 1	Witness	
1993	The Temp	Rosemary	
1993	Three of Hearts	Operator	
1993	Brainsmasher... A Love Story	Makeup artist	
1993	Amityville: A New Generation	Nurse Turner	
1993	Even Cowgirls Get the Blues	Rubber Rose maid	
1994	Corrina, Corrina	Repeat nanny	
1994	Wes Craven's New Nightmare	Nurse	
1994	Dumb & Dumber	Mrs. Margie Neugeboren	
1995	The Nature of the Beast	Carol Powell	
1996	Kingpin	Landlady	
1996	Last Man Standing	The Madame	
1997	Trading Favors	Darla	
1998	Living Out Loud	Lisa's nurse	
1998	There's Something About Mary	Magda	
1998	Behind the Zipper with Magda	Magda	Short film
1999	Detroit Rock City	Mrs. Bruce	
2000	Me, Myself & Irene	Mrs. Caleron	Scenes deleted
2000	Attention Shoppers	Libby	
2001	Say It Isn't So	Nurse Bautista	
2001	A Letter from My Father	Elise	
2001	Without Charlie	Unknown	
2002	Wish You Were Dead	Jinny MacIntosh	
2002	Contagion	Laura Crowley	
2002	Man of the Year	Flora	
2002	Boat Trip	Coach Sonya	
2002	Who's Your Daddy?	Ms. Harding	
2003	Manfast	Marge	
2003	National Lampoon's Barely Legal	Tequila	
2003	Dumb and Dumberer: When Harry Met Lloyd	Margie Neugeboren	
2003	Dead End	Laura Harrington	
2003	Stuck on You	Makeup babe	
2004	The Almost Guys	Repo boss	
2004	Cross Bronx	Barbara Green	
2004	The Latin Lover	Emilia	Short film
2004	A Cinderella Story	Mrs. Wells	
2004	Cellular	Exotic car driver	
2004	Wear Something Nice	Mom	Short film
2004	The Hillside Strangler	Jenny Buono	
2005	Hate Crime	Kathleen Slansky	
2005	Confessions of an Action Star	Samantha Jones	
2005	2001 Maniacs	Granny Boon	
2005	Drop Dead Sexy	Ma Muzzy	
2005	Born Killers	Willow	
2005	Jesus, Mary and Joey	Lulu	
2006	Unbeatable Harold	Jeannie	
2006	Hoboken Hollow	Mrs. Brodrick	
2006	Bachelor Party Vegas	Cassandra	
2006	Hood of Horror	Clara	
2006	Snakes on a Plane	Grace	
2006	Surf School	Larry's mom	
2006	Down the P.C.H.	Wendy O'Hara	
2006	Driftwood	Nancy Forrester	
2006	National Lampoon's Pledge This!	Miss Prin	
2007	The Election	The Wife	Short film
2007	Chasing Robert	Martha, the Bookie	
2007	Homo Erectus	Museum guide	
2007	Kush	Susan	
2008	Killer Pad	Marge	
2008	Asylum	String's mother	
2008	Chronic Town	Nurse	
2008	Doggie Heaven	Woman	Short film
2009	My Sister's Keeper	Nurse Adele	
2009	American Cowslip	Lou Anne	
2009	Stuntmen	"Bumble" Jackson	
2009	Dark Moon Rising	Sunny	
2009	Yellow Brook	Narrator	Short film
2010	2001 Maniacs: Field of Screams	Granny Boone	
2010	The Penthouse	Frances	
2010	Pickin' & Grinnin'	Bonnie Johnson	
2010	Small Town Saturday Night	Phyllis	
2010	The Accidental Death of Joey by Sue	Mrs. Rawlings	
2010	The Land of the Astronauts	Mrs. Harris	
2010	Insidious	Elise Rainier	
2010	Killer by Nature	Leona Whitmore	
2010	VideoDome Rent-O-Rama	The Lush	Short film
2010	Sex Tax: Based on a True Story	Lydia Friedman	
2011	Sedona	Claire	
2011	Losing Control	Dolores	
2011	A Good Old Fashioned Orgy	Dody	
2011	Chillerama	Baglady / Nurse Maleva	
2011	Take Me Home	Jill	
2011	Rosewood Lane	Mrs. Hawthorne	
2011	Red & Blue Marbles	Janitor	
2011	Jackie Goldberg: Private Dick	Violet	
2011	Dead of Nowhere 3D	Meemaw	Short film
2011	Black Velvet	Pool lady	
2012	The Three Stooges	Nursery nurse	
2012	FDR: American Badass!	Eleanor Roosevelt	
2012	Jewtopia	Dr. Sutton	
2012	3 Days of Normal	May	
2012	Noobz	Mrs. Theodore	
2012	Life's an Itch	Gloria	
2012	Dr. 420	Dr. 420	Short film
2013	Insidious: Chapter 2	Elise Rainier	
2013	All American Christmas Carol	Barbara Belnap	
2013	Crazy Kind of Love	Denise Mack	
2013	Big Ass Spider!	Mrs. Jefferson	
2014	Lost Time	Mysterious woman	
2014	The Signal	Mirabelle	
2014	Grace: The Possession	Helen	
2014	Ouija	Paulina Zander	
2015	Don Quixote	The Grand Lady	
2015	Insidious: Chapter 3	Elise Rainier	
2015	Tales of Halloween	Lynn's mother	Segment: "Grim Grinning Ghost"
2015	Sick People	Waitress / Sandra	
2015	Helen Keller vs. Nightwolves	Helen Keller	
2016	Texas Heart	Mrs. Smith	
2016	Director's Cut	Captain Wheeler	
2016	Jack Goes Home	Teresa	
2016	Abattoir	Allie	
2016	Buster's Mal Heart	Pauline	
2016	The Midnight Man	Anna Luster	
2016	Ouija: Origin of Evil	Paulina Zander	
2017	Mountain Top	Muriel Miller	
2017	Grow House	Mrs. Gilliam	
2017	All About the Money	Mrs. Womack	
2017	The Black Room	Mrs. Black	
2018	Insidious: The Last Key	Elise Rainier	
2018	Los Angeles Overnight	Cousins	
2018	Gothic Harvest	Griselda	
2018	The Final Wish	Kate Hammond	
2018	The Old World!	The Aunt (voice)	Short film
2019	Room for Rent	Joyce	Also producer
2019	Get Gone	Mama Maxwell	
2019	Ambition	Lady Bum	
2019	Bayou Tales	Margot	
2020	The Grudge	Faith Matheson	
2020	Dreamkatcher	Ruth	Also executive producer
2020	The Voices	Vagabond	
2020	Darkness Falls	Angela Anderson	
2020	Max Reload and the Nether Blasters	Mrs. Wylder	
2020	The Call	Edith Cranston	
2021	Ted Bundy: American Boogeyman	Mrs. Bundy	
2021	Frank and Penelope	Ophelia	
2022	We Are Gathered Here Today	Jean Cole	
2023	Insidious: The Red Door	Elise Rainier	
2024	Scared to Death	Max	
2024	The Last Stand of Ellen Cole	Ellen Cole	
2026	Insidious: Out of the Further	Elise Rainier	
TBA	Killing Winston Jones	Madeline Jones	
TBA	The Gnashing	Julie	Post-production
TBA	Devoted	TBA	Post-production

=== Television ===
Year	Title	Role	Notes
1977	Sex and the Married Woman	Sandra	Television film
1977	Eight Is Enough	Bandmember	Episode: "The Return of Auntie V"
1979	The Triangle Factory Fire Scandal	Freida	Television film
1979	The Seeding of Sarah Burns	2nd nurse	Television film
1980	A Cry for Love	Unknown	Television film
1984	Why Me?	Unknown	Television film
1984	Summer Fantasy	Woman on beach	Television film
1985	The Twilight Zone	Kate Simmons	Episode: "Chameleon"
1986	Cagney & Lacey	Secretary	Episode: "DWI"
1986	Falcon Crest	Smoking female prisoner	Episode: "Unholy Alliances"
1987	Who's the Boss?	Mrs. Padnick	Episode: "Mona"
1987	Mistress	Woman customer	Television film
1988	Highway to Heaven	Lila Barnes	Episode: "A Mother's Love"
1991	Life Goes On	Parent #2	Episode: "Life After Death"
1992	Her Final Fury: Betty Broderick, the Last Chapter	Inmate	Television film
1992	Roseanne	Cynthia	Episode: "Breaking Up Is Hard to Do"
1993	Torch Song	Teamster	Television film
1993	Sisters	Nightmare host #2	Episode: "Sleepless in Winnetka"
1994	In the Line of Duty: The Price of Vengeance	Foreman #2	Television film
1994	My So-Called Life	Parent #2	Episode: "Guns and Gossip"
1995	Sketch Artist II: Hands That See	Bonnie	Television film
1995	Trial by Fire	Phyllis Cardell	Television film
1996	Project ALF	Waitress	Television film
1996	Frasier	Anne	Episode: "The Focus Group"
1997	Perversions of Science	The Nurse	Episode: "Dream of Doom"
1998	Breakfast with Einstein	Miss Desmond	Television film
1998	Becker	Mrs. Cooper	Episode: "Take These Pills and Shove 'Em"
2000	Arliss	Unknown	Episode: "The Value of Honesty"
2004	Crossing Jordan	Leather Lauren	Episode: "Is That Plutonium in Your Pocket, or Are You Just Happy to See Me?"
2006	My Name Is Earl	Paul's mom	Episode: "Number One"
2007	On the Lot	Various roles	Unknown episodes
2007	Dirty Sexy Money	Leslie Donovan	Episode: "The Game"
2009	ER	Margaret	Episode: "And in the End..."
2010	Next Stop Murder	Detective Reeson	Television film
2010	Farewell Mr. Kringle	Zelda	Television film
2012	Matchmaker Santa	Debbie	Television film
2012	Waffle Hut	Jerrie Wolf	Television film
2013	Private Practice	Mrs. Taylor	Episode: "Full Release"
2013	Kroll Show	Unknown	Episode: "Soaked in Success"
2015	Things You Shouldn't Say Past Midnight	Mrs. Abramson	3 episodes
2016	Still the King	Ruthie	Episode: “Mother Trucker”
2016	American Gothic	Lila	Episode: "The Artist in His Museum"
2016	Grip and Electric	Glenda	4 episodes
2019	EastSiders	Diane	2 episodes
2020	Penny Dreadful: City of Angels	Dottie Minter	6 episodes

=== Video games ===
Year	Title	Voice role	Notes
2000	Code Blue	Leslie Miller	
2022	The Quarry	Constance Hackett	Voice, motion capture and likeness

== Awards and nominations ==
Year	Award	Category	Work	Result
1999	Blockbuster Entertainment Awards	Favorite Supporting Actress – Comedy	There's Something About Mary	Nominated
2002	Method Fest Independent Film Festival	Best Supporting Actress	—N/a	Won
2004	Peñíscola Comedy Film Festival	Best Actress	Dead End	Won
2005	Breckenridge Festival Of Film	Best Supporting Actress	Hate Crime	Won
2005	Fangoria Chainsaw Awards	Best Supporting Actress	Dead End	Nominated
2011	Fright Meter Awards	Best Supporting Actress	Insidious	Won
2012	Cyber-Horror Awards	Best Supporting Actress	Insidious	Nominated
2012	Fangoria Chainsaw Awards	Best Supporting Actress	Insidious	Won
2012	Saturn Awards	Best Supporting Actress	Insidious	Nominated
2014	Fright Meter Awards	Best Ensemble Cast	Insidious: Chapter 2	Nominated
2016	Fright Meter Awards	Best Leading Actress	Insidious: Chapter 3	Nominated
2019	HorrorHound Film Fest	Legend Award	Herself	Won
2019	Fright Meter Awards	Best Actress	Room for Rent	Nominated
2019	Action On Film International Film Festival	Best Supporting Actress	Get Gone	Nominated
2020	Daytime Emmy Awards	Outstanding Guest Performer in a Digital Drama Series	Eastsiders	Won
