= 2001 Maniacs =

2005 American comedy horror film directed by Tim Sullivan

- Pre-production promotional poster
- Directed by: Tim Sullivan
- Written by: Chris Kobin; Tim Sullivan
- Based on: Two Thousand Maniacs! by Herschell Gordon Lewis
- Produced by: Boaz Yakin; Scott Spiegel; Eli Roth; Christopher Tuffin; Brett W. Nemeroff
- Starring: Robert Englund; Lin Shaye; Giuseppe Andrews; Jay Gillespie
- Cinematography: Steve Adcock
- Edited by: Michael Ross
- Music by: Nathan Barr
- Production companies: Raw Nerve; Velvet Steamroller
- Distributed by: Lions Gate Films
- Release dates: July 9, 2005 (Fantasia); October 21, 2005
- Running time: 87 minutes
- Country: United States
- Language: English
- Budget: $1.5 million

2001 Maniacs is a 2005 American comedy horror film directed by Tim Sullivan and starring Robert Englund, Lin Shaye, Jay Gillespie, Dylan Edrington, and Matthew Carey. It is a remake of the 1964 film Two Thousand Maniacs! written and directed by Herschell Gordon Lewis. The film is distributed by Lions Gate Entertainment. It was filmed in Westville, Georgia.

== Plot ==
College students Anderson, Nelson, and Cory become lost while heading to Daytona Beach for spring break, and follow a 'Detour' sign that leads them to the southern town of Pleasant Valley, led by eccentric mayor Buckman. Three other travelers - Ricky, Kat, and Joey - arrive shortly afterwards, and Buckman tells them that for the next two days they will be honored guests at the town's annual 'Guts N Glory Jubilee.' They are joined by two other travelers, biker couple Malcolm and Leah, and all are given rooms at an inn run by Granny Boone and her son Hucklebilly.

Soon after settling in, Kat is killed by being drawn and quartered, her body being served as a dish for the others. Later in the evening, Nelson is killed when he drinks battery acid, thinking it's moonshine. The following day, the group are separated and go off into different areas of the town.

Leah is dressed in a southern dress and motioned to come up to the podium during a celebration, where Granny Boone pulls a rope and crushes her with a large bell. Ricky sees this and runs off to alert the others, but he is accosted by Buckman's son and held down as two female residents impale him with a large poker.

Joey finds Kat's dog tags and the group realizes that both Kat and Nelson have been gone for a long time. They make a plan to find their missing friends and belongings, and then get out of town, but are stopped by Buckman making subtle threats.

Malcolm sets off to find Leah and is lured to a cotton press, where he is killed after being crushed. Cory and Joey head to the hotel to get their belongings, but Cory forgets his phone and leaves Joey to go get it. Joey finds a cabinet filled with jars of different body parts and dates reflecting many years of Jubilees, but before she can run off, she is captured. Cory returns to his room and is seduced by one of the townsfolk. He sits down, thinking that she is going to perform oral sex, but instead she puts on metal fangs and mauls his crotch, killing him.

Anderson finds Malcolm's motorbike being guarded by Hucklebilly in the barn, and although he attempts to goad him into giving him the keys, Hucklebilly knocks him out. Later that night, Anderson and Joey find themselves tied up by the townsfolk, who taunt them for coming into their town. Buckman shows the two their friend's severed heads and tells them that their bodies are the barbecue the townsfolk will feast upon. Buckman offers to spare Anderson if he kills Joey, since he was originally from the South, but he refuses. Anderson and Buckman have a battle that ends with Anderson ripping Buckman's eyepatch off, revealing it to be an empty hole with maggots inside. Buckman pleads with Anderson not to take his other eye and lets him and Joey go.

The next day, Anderson and Joey go to the local authorities, who are skeptical, but follow them to Pleasant Valley. When they get there, the town has disappeared and is nothing more than a graveyard. Anderson reads a plaque that reveals that during the Civil War, a group of Union troops came and massacred everybody in the town, now the residents will not rest until they avenge their deaths, revealing that the residents that the group met were the vengeful ghosts of the townsfolk.

As the two drive away on their motorcycle, they are decapitated by barbed wire, which was placed by Hucklebilly. He picks up their heads and vanishes as he walks down the road.

== Cast ==
- Robert Englund as Mayor George W. Buckman
- Lin Shaye as Granny Boone
- Giuseppe Andrews as Harper Alexander
- Jay Gillespie as Anderson Lee
- Matthew Carey as Cory Jones
- Peter Stormare as Professor Ackerman
- Marla Malcolm as Joey
- Gina Marie Heekin as Kat
- Brian Gross as Ricky
- Mushond Lee as Malcolm
- Dylan Edrington as Nelson Elliot
- Bianca Smith as Leah
- Brendan McCarthy as Rufus
- Adam Robitel as Lester
- Christa Campbell as Milk Maiden
- Wendy Kremer as Peaches
- Cristin Michele as Glendora
- Kodi Kitchen as Hester
- Ryan Fleming as Hucklebilly Boone
- Eli Roth as Justin
- Bill McKinney as Chef
- Kane Hodder as Jason

== Production ==
Filming took place on November 3, 2003, in Westville then located in Lumpkin, Georgia and ended on December 1, 2003. Eli Roth, who produced the film, reprised his role of Justin from his own film, Cabin Fever.

== Release ==
The film was released May 12, 2005. The film was released on DVD in 2007.

== Sequel ==
On the official Facebook page for the film, the sequel 2001 Maniacs: The Beverly Hellbillys was announced (later renamed to 2001 Maniacs: Field of Screams). Mayor Buckman and Harper Alexander were portrayed in the sequel by Bill Moseley and Nivek Ogre respectively.

== See also ==
- List of ghost films
