= Blood Feast 2: All U Can Eat =

2002 American slasher splatter film directed by Herschell Gordon Lewis

- DVD cover
- Directed by: Herschell Gordon Lewis
- Written by: W. Boyd Ford
- Produced by: Jacky Lee Morgan; W. Boyd Ford; Penelope Helmer; Melissa Morgan; Brian Pitt; Steven Teagle; Jimi Woods; David F. Friedman
- Starring: John McConnell; Mark McLachlan; Melissa Morgan; Toni Wynne; J.P. Delahoussaye
- Cinematography: Chris W. Johnson
- Edited by: Steven Teagle
- Distributed by: Queso Grande Productions Inc. Shriek Show (DVD) (U.S.)
- Release date: March 31, 2002
- Running time: 92 minutes 99 minutes (director's cut)
- Country: United States
- Language: English

Blood Feast 2: All U Can Eat is a 2002 slasher splatter film directed by Herschell Gordon Lewis and starring John McConnell, Mark McLachlan, Melissa Morgan, Toni Wynne, and J.P. Delahoussaye. It is the sequel to the 1963 film Blood Feast. Filmed under a working title of Blood Feast 2: Buffet of Blood and using the same grindhouse style as its predecessor, the film continues the story began in the original film, where a grandson of Fuad Ramses attempts to restart his grandfather's catering business. The film depicts the killer falling victim to spirit possession by the goddess Ishtar.

The film was completed a year before its release but had trouble finding a distributor.

== Plot ==
Fuad Ramses III returns to Miami to reopen his grandfather's defunct catering company. This arouses the suspicions of Detective Loomis who was the young investigating officer during his grandfather’s notorious murder spree in 1963.

When Fuad III is asked by local socialite Mrs. Lampley to cater her daughter Tiffani’s wedding to Detective Myers ( Loomis' partner), Fuad III jumps at the opportunity in hopes of redeeming his family’s name and win favor with the well connected Mrs. Lampley whose coveted recommendation would keep him booked for months.

Also while working with Tiffani and her mother on the menu, he begins a flirtatious back-and-forth with Tiffani’s maid of honor and best friend Bambi Deere leading for the two of them to realize the possibility of an actual romantic connection.

Just as things are looking up for Fuad III, he discovers his grandfather’s statue of Ishtar, an Egyptian Babylonian goddess, tucked away in a utility closet and immediately becomes possessed by a malevolent spirit who sets out to complete the “Blood Feast” his grandfather failed to finish decades ago.

To create the “Blood Feast” large amounts of human flesh, organs and blood are required as the main ingredients. To construct the vessel for Ishtar’s return: the head, torso and various limbs of nubile young women are needed.

Fuad III consequently targets Tiffani's bridal party for the ingredients as well as using the remaining parts and pieces of the unsuspecting bridesmaids: Misti, Trixie, Brandi, Candi and Laci to rebuild Ishtar's new body with the maid of honor - Bambi - to serve as the head.

In the following days leading up to the wedding, Fuad III begins hunting down the bridesmaids one by one:

- When Laci takes a sensuous, relaxing shower after a long day, Fuad III breaks into her home and proceeds to disembowel and dismember her.

- Trixie is lured to Fuad III’s shop where she is stabbed to death and tossed in a meat grinder.

- During Tiffani’s lingerie bridal shower - Candi and Misti sneak off for tipsy girl on girl action when they are brutally hacked to pieces by Fuad III who takes off into the night with their remains.

- Bambi and Tiffany are kidnapped after being forced to watch Brandi get flayed with a knife while alive as Fuad III pulls the skin from her head and neck over her head as she screams.

With the last of the bridal party now missing, Detective Myers and Loomis discover the two girls have been marked to be the horrific final act for the "Blood Feast” and race against time to save the girls and put an end to Fuad III's gruesome rampage.

== Cast ==
- J.P. Delahoussaye as Fuad Ramses III
- John McConnell as Detective Dave Loomis
- Mark McLachlan as Detective Mike Myers
- Toni Wynne as Tiffani Lampley
- Christy Brown as Bambi Deere
- Melissa Morgan as Mrs. Lampley
- Cindy Roubal as Brandi Alexander
- Christina Cuenca as Misti Morning
- Michelle Miller as Laci Hundees
- Kristi Polit as Trixie Treater
- Jill Rao as Candi Graham
- Chris Mauer as Mr. Lampley
- Veronica Russell as The Secretary
- John Waters as Reverend
- Penelope Helmer as Officer Pippi
- Stevie Leininger as "Stripey"
- Billy Slaughter as Best Man

== Release ==
The film had its world premiere at the 2001 Butt-Numb-A-Thon in Austin, Texas. It had its UK premiere at the Dead by Dawn Edinburgh Horror Film Festival in Edinburgh, Scotland on 31 March 2002, and was released on DVD by Media Blasters' horror label Shriek Show on 29 July.

== Reception ==
A review in TV Guide stated "The expectations for Blood Feast 2 were high, but Lewis hasn't let his fans down. With this career-capping tribute to himself and his audience, Lewis manages to simultaneously satisfy and parody the sick lusts that have made his film career possible".
