= Time Served =

Time Served may refer to:

- Time served, a criminal law term
- Time Served (film), a 1999 American prison film
- Time Served (album), an album by Moneybagg Yo
- Time Served (General Hospital: Night Shift)
