= Neil Travis =

American film and television editor

- Born: Herbert Neil Travis; October 12, 1936; Los Angeles, California
- Died: March 28, 2012 (aged 75); Arroyo Grande, California
- Occupation: film editor

Herbert Neil Travis (October 12, 1936 – March 28, 2012) was an American film and television editor with about 28 feature film credits from 1970–2007. He is best known for editing the television miniseries Roots (1977) and the feature film Dances with Wolves (1990).

Travis was born in Los Angeles, California, and received a bachelor's degree in film and theater arts from the University of California, Los Angeles.

Travis won the Primetime Emmy Award for Outstanding Film Editing In A Drama Series for the first part of the television miniseries Roots (1977), and he and James Heckert were nominated for the award for the second part as well. Travis won the Academy Award for Best Film Editing and the American Cinema Editors Eddie for the film Dances with Wolves (directed by Kevin Costner-1990). Travis had been selected as a member of the American Cinema Editors, and received the Career Achievement Award in 2010.

In 2010, Travis was interviewed about his career by Karen Herman for the Archive of American Television.

== Filmography ==
Editor
Year	Film	Director	Notes	Ref.
1970	The Traveling Executioner	Jack Smight		
1972	The Cowboys	Mark Rydell	Second collaboration with Mark Rydell	
1978	Jaws 2	Jeannot Szwarc		
1979	Hot Stuff	Dom DeLuise		
1980	Die Laughing	Jeff Werner		
1980	Nights at O'Rear's	Robert Mandel		
1980	The Idolmaker	Taylor Hackford		
1981	Nobody's Perfekt	Peter Bonerz		
1983	Second Thoughts	Lawrence Turman		
1983	Cujo	Lewis Teague		
1984	The Philadelphia Experiment	Stewart Raffill		
1985	Marie	Roger Donaldson	First collaboration with Roger Donaldson	
1987	No Way Out	Roger Donaldson	Second collaboration with Roger Donaldson	
1988	Cocktail	Roger Donaldson	Third collaboration with Roger Donaldson	
1990	Dances with Wolves	Kevin Costner		
1991	Deceived	Damian Harris		
1992	Patriot Games	Phillip Noyce	First collaboration with Phillip Noyce	
1993	Bopha!	Morgan Freeman		
1994	Clear and Present Danger	Phillip Noyce	Second collaboration with Phillip Noyce	
1995	Outbreak	Wolfgang Petersen		
1996	Moll Flanders	Pen Densham		
1997	The Edge	Lee Tamahori	First collaboration with Lee Tamahori	
1998	Stepmom	Chris Columbus	First collaboration with Chris Columbus	
1999	Bicentennial Man	Chris Columbus	Second collaboration with Chris Columbus	
2001	Along Came a Spider	Lee Tamahori	Second collaboration with Lee Tamahori	
2002	The Sum of All Fears	Phil Alden Robinson		
2003	Terminator 3: Rise of the Machines	Jonathan Mostow		
2007	Premonition	Mennan Yapo		

Editorial department
Year	Film	Director	Role	Notes
1965	Billie	Don Weis	Assistant editor	
1968	Hell in the Pacific	John Boorman	Assistant editor	
1969	The Reivers	Mark Rydell	Associate film editor	First collaboration with Mark Rydell
2004	I, Robot	Alex Proyas	Additional editing	

TV movies

Editor
Year	Film	Director	Notes
1971	They Call It Murder	Walter Grauman	
1972	Climb an Angry Mountain	Leonard Horn	
1973	The Bait	Leonard Horn	
1974	Men of the Dragon	Harry Falk	
1976	The Dark Side of Innocence	Jerry Thorpe	
1977	Snowbeast	Herb Wallerstein	Uncredited
1977	Alexander: The Other Side of Dawn	John Erman	
1985	The Atlanta Child Murders	John Erman	
1988	Hot Paint	Sheldon Larry	
1989	Shannon's Deal	Lewis Teague	

TV pilots

Editor
Year	Film	Director
1975	Black Bart	Robert Butler

TV series

Editor
Year	Title	Notes
1973	Roll Out	6 episodes
1974−76	Harry O	15 episodes
1977	Roots	2 episodes
1979	Roots: The Next Generations	2 episodes
1984	The Master	1 episode
1985	The Atlanta Child Murders	2 episodes
1987	Out on a Limb	1 episode
2006	Brotherhood	1 episode

Additional crew
Year	Title	Role	Notes
1966−67	Please Don't Eat the Daisies	Assistant to the producer	28 episodes

Writer
Year	Title	Notes
1967	Please Don't Eat the Daisies	1 episode

TV specials

Editor
Year	Title
2007	79th Academy Awards

== Awards ==
=== Academy Awards 1991, USA ===
Award	Person
Academy Award for Editing 'Dances with Wolves'	Neil Travis

=== Primetime Emmy Awards 1977, USA ===
Award	Person
Outstanding Film Editing in a Drama Series 'Roots'	Neil Travis

=== American Cinema Editors 2010, USA ===
Award	Person
Career Achievement Award	Neil Travis
