= Premonition (2007 film) =

2007 film by Mennan Yapo

- Theatrical release poster
- Directed by: Mennan Yapo
- Written by: Bill Kelly
- Produced by: Ashok Amritraj; Jon Jashni; Adam Shankman; Jennifer Gibgot; Sunil Perkash
- Starring: Sandra Bullock; Julian McMahon; Nia Long; Kate Nelligan; Amber Valletta; Peter Stormare
- Cinematography: Torsten Lippstock
- Edited by: Neil Travis
- Music by: Klaus Badelt
- Production companies: TriStar Pictures; Metro-Goldwyn-Mayer Pictures; Hyde Park Entertainment; Offspring Entertainment
- Distributed by: Sony Pictures Releasing (North America); Hyde Park International (International)
- Release date: March 16, 2007
- Running time: 96 minutes
- Country: United States
- Language: English
- Budget: $20 million
- Box office: $84.1 million

Premonition is a 2007 American supernatural psychological thriller directed by Mennan Yapo and starring Sandra Bullock in the lead role, with Julian McMahon, Nia Long, Kate Nelligan (in her final film role), Amber Valletta and Peter Stormare. The film's plot depicts homemaker Linda experiencing the days surrounding her husband's death in a non-chronological order and attempting to save him from his impending doom. Premonition was released on March 16, 2007 by Sony Pictures Releasing in North America and by Hyde Park International in international markets. The film received negative reviews from critics and grossed $84.1 million against a $20 million budget.

== Plot ==
Jim and Linda Hanson are married with two daughters, Megan and Bridgette, but their relationship is faltering. Shortly after Linda listens to his voicemail from Jim, who is away on a business trip, Sheriff Reilly informs her that Jim died in a car crash the previous day (Wednesday). Linda's mother Joanne comes to help, and Linda falls asleep in the living room.

Linda awakens in bed the following morning, only to discover that is Monday, two days before the fatal crash, and finds Jim alive downstairs. While she is out driving, Sheriff Reilly pulls her over without recognizing her.

Linda next awakens on Friday, two days after Jim’s fatal crash, and finds an empty bottle of lithium prescribed by Dr. Norman Roth. She then goes downstairs to Jim’s wake, and when she goes outside, she sees their daughters on the swings. When Bridgette turns toward her, Linda notices cuts on Bridgette’s face.

After awakening on Saturday, three days after Jim’s death, Linda arrives at his funeral at the same time as his casket. She demands that the funeral director open it to confirm that he is inside; there is a scuffle, and Jim's severed head falls from the casket.

At Jim's burial, Linda notices an unknown woman, who flees when approached. Linda finds Dr. Roth's number, but his office is only open on weekdays. Roth later commits her to a mental-health facility. He confides in Reilly that Linda told him Jim was dead the day before the accident, suggesting that she murdered him and scarred Bridgette's face.

The "next" day (Tuesday, a day before Jim's death), Linda awakens in bed with Jim in the shower. After taking the girls to school, she can't find the lithium bottle. She goes to Dr. Roth's office, but he doesn't recognize her, and she tells him about her premonitions. Not believing her, he prescribes her lithium.

At Jim's office, Linda meets the stranger from the funeral, Claire Francis. She observes Jim and Claire's interaction and chemistry. At home, Linda empties the lithium into the sink.

As Linda and the girls bring in the laundry from a storm, Bridgette crashes through the glass door, severely cutting her face and hands. Linda rushes her to the emergency room, and when Jim arrives he blames her.

Suddenly, she realizes that her days are unfolding out of order. She creates a calendar of events and records Tuesday as the current day. Before Jim goes to bed, she begs him not to go on the business trip. She makes him promise to wake her on Wednesday morning before he leaves.

On Friday morning (the wake day again), Linda's mom is there. She updates the calendar, then goes to Claire's house, where Claire confesses to the almost-affair. Linda finds an insurance policy in their safe-deposit box Jim had updated two days earlier, tripling the benefits.

Linda visits their priest, then the funeral home. Returning home to her mother and daughters, she announces she just made Saturday funeral arrangements. Linda asks her mom if she "lets" Jim die, is it the same as killing him? Her mother replies, "Jim is already dead.”

The "next" day (the Sunday beginning the week when Jim dies), Linda suggests that Jim spend time with the girls while she visits their priest. He talks about other cases where people have had premonitions and explains that she needs to have faith. She then drives to mile marker 220, Jim's accident site, to see what might have happened.

Jim and the girls return home, and Linda insists that he tell them he loves them before bed. Outside in the rain, she pleads with him about their relationship, saying they're running out of time. When lightning strikes a power line, it kills the crow she had found dead previously (on the Monday before the Wednesday Jim was due to die while she'd been hanging out the laundry). That night (still the Sunday), she tells him her dream about his death. Jim insists that it was only a dream, and they spend the night together.

Linda wakes up on THE Wednesday. Jim's note says he has taken the kids to school and will be back tomorrow. Jim is seen at the bank with the insurance agent. Linda finds that their kids are already at school. Jim calls Claire at the hotel and ends it. Then he leaves the message from the beginning of the film.

As Jim nears the accident site, Linda reaches him by cell phone and they reconcile. She tries to get him to avert the accident, but an oncoming fuel-tanker truck jackknifes, takes off the car's roof, and explodes, killing both drivers.

The final scene occurs a few months later. Linda recalls the priest's words about faith. In the last frame, Linda is seen pregnant.

== Cast ==
- Sandra Bullock as Linda Hanson
- Julian McMahon as James "Jim" Hanson
- Nia Long as Annie
- Kate Nelligan as Joanne
- Amber Valletta as Claire Francis
- Peter Stormare as Dr. Norman Roth
- Courtney Taylor Burness as Bridgette Hanson
- Shyann McClure as Megan Hanson
- Marc Macaulay as Sheriff Reilly
- Jude Ciccolella as Father Kennedy
- Mark Famiglietti as Doug Caruthers
- Marcus Lyle Brown as Bob
- E.J. Stapleton as Model Home Salesman
- Matt Moore as Young Priest
- Irene Zeigler as Mrs. Quinn
- Laurel Whitsett as School Aide
- Kristin Ketterer as Receptionist
- Jason Douglas as Emergency Room Doctor
- Dave Shaffer as Doctor's Assistant
- Floriana Tullio as Nurse

== Production ==
Principal photography mostly took place in Minden and Shreveport, Louisiana. This film is the first to be co-distributed by TriStar Pictures and Metro-Goldwyn-Mayer.

== Release ==
The film was first released in the United States on March 16, 2007. It was not released theatrically in Norway, but it was released direct-to-video on January 2, 2008 there.

=== Home media ===
The film was released on Blu-ray and DVD on July 17, 2007 by Sony Pictures Home Entertainment.

== Reception ==
=== Box office ===
Premonition opened in 2,831 theaters and came in third place behind 300 and Wild Hogs, opening with $17,558,689 with a $6,202 average. The film stayed in theaters for 7 weeks and grossed $47,852,604 in the United States and $84,146, 832 worldwide.

=== Critical reception ===
Premonition was panned by critics. Review aggregator Rotten Tomatoes reports that 8% of 160 critics gave the film a positive review, with a rating average of 4.00/10. The site's general consensus is that "Overdosing on flashbacks, and more portentous than profound, the overly obtuse Premonition weakly echoes such twisty classics as Memento, The Sixth Sense, and Groundhog Day." On Metacritic, which assigns a normalized rating out of 100 to reviews from film critics, the film is considered to have "generally unfavorable reviews" with a rating score of 29 based on 30 critics. Critic James Berardinelli gave the movie 2-1/2-stars (out of five) stating, "There's some interesting material in the film about pre-destination and questions about whether it's possible to change fate." Expressing similar thoughts of blasé opaque contributions of the main characters wife Linda Hanson (Sandra Bullock) and husband James Hanson (Julian McMahon). Despite the bad reviews, several critics, including Rex Reed, commended Sandra Bullock for her performance.
