= Soundless =

- Theatrical release poster
- Directed by: Mennan Yapo
- Written by: Mennan Yapo; Lars-Olav Beier
- Produced by: Stefan Arndt; Tom Tykwer
- Starring: Joachim Król; Nadja Uhl
- Cinematography: Torsten Lippstock
- Edited by: Dirk Vaihinger
- Music by: Gary Marlowe; Ben Mono
- Distributed by: X Verleih AG (through Warner Bros.)
- Release date: 29 April 2004
- Running time: 94 minutes
- Country: Germany
- Language: German

Soundless (German: Lautlos) is a 2004 German crime film directed by Mennan Yapo.

== Plot ==
Victor is a meticulous and silent hitman. During a contract, he falls in love with a blonde woman and spares her life, later saving her from danger. Nina finds Victor again but also leads Lang, a police profiler, to his trail. Victor and Nina attempt to escape while Lang and the police pursue them in a cat-and-mouse chase.

== Cast ==
- Joachim Król as Viktor
- Nadja Uhl as Nina
- Christian Berkel as Lang
- Rudolf Martin as Der junge Polizist
- Lisa Martinek as Die Ermittlerin
- Peter Fitz as Martin Hinrich
- Wilhelm Manske as Der Russe
- Gertraud Jesserer as Grundschullehrerin
- Mehmet Kurtuluş as Sicherheitschef des Russen
- Murat Yilmaz as Killer des Russen
- Jale Arıkan as Freundin des Russen
