= John McConnell (actor) =

American actor

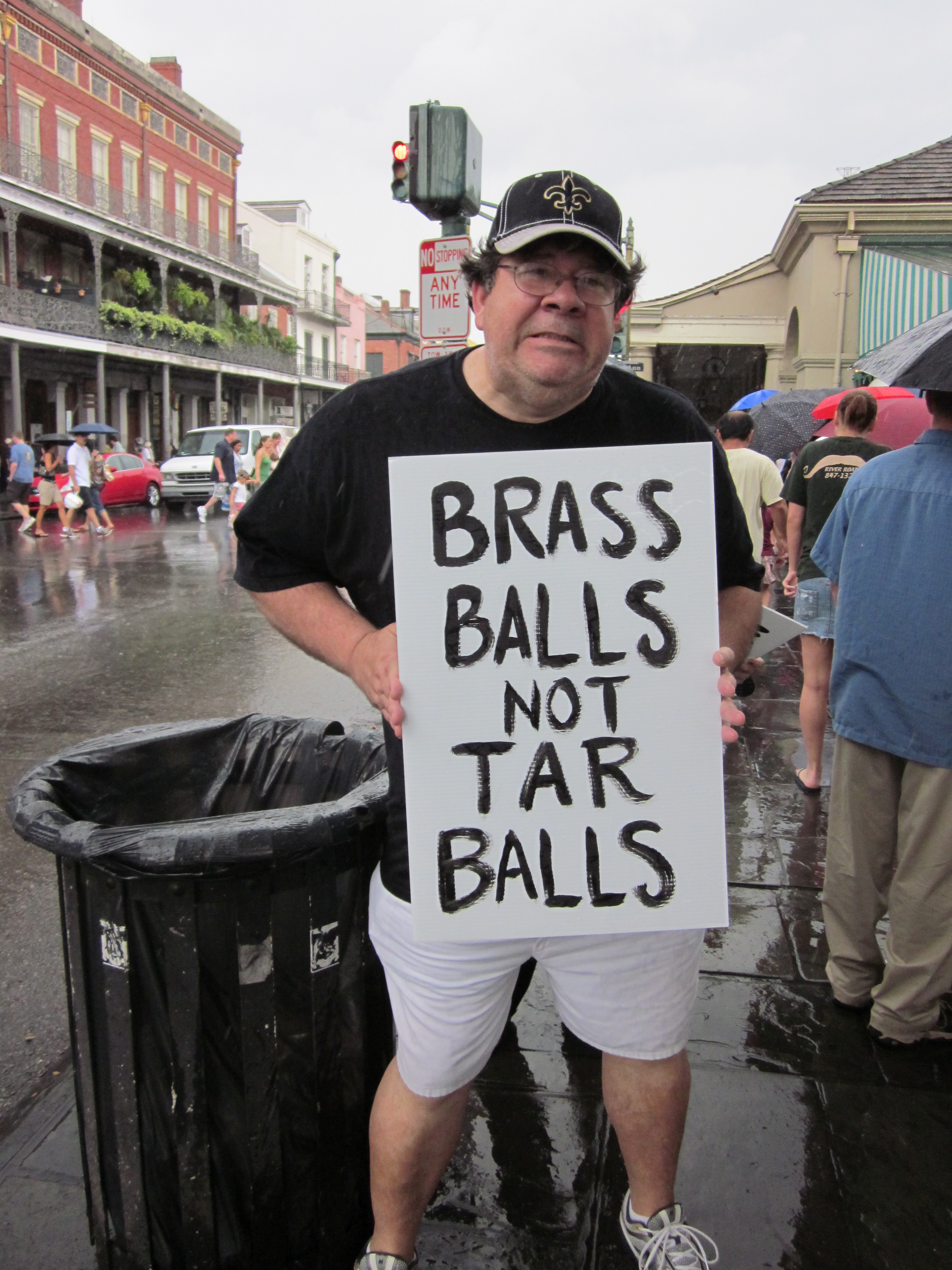
- McConnell at the "BP Oil Flood" protest in New Orleans
- Born: November 13, 1958 (age 67); Baton Rouge, Louisiana, U.S.
- Occupation: Actor

John "Spud" McConnell (born November 13, 1958) is an American actor and television/radio personality based in New Orleans, Louisiana. He is married to actor/producer Maureen Brennan.

McConnell is a character actor who has appeared in more than 40 films, ranging from obscure independent films (mostly filmed locally in New Orleans, or elsewhere set in the Gulf Coast region) to major cinematic release movies such as O Brother, Where Art Thou?, Django Unchained, 12 Years a Slave, and Interview with the Vampire. McConnell has also appeared in numerous plays, including an off-Broadway run in the one-man show The Kingfish, wherein he portrays colorful Louisiana Governor Huey P. Long. He is perhaps best known for having portrayed Ignatius J. Reilly from the Pulitzer Prize-winning novel A Confederacy of Dunces, and in that role was the model for a life-sized bronze statue of the fictitious character on historic Canal Street in downtown New Orleans.

On television, McConnell has had recurring roles in several series, among them Underground and Hap & Leonard. He also made several appearances over three seasons of Roseanne, with good friend and colleague John Goodman. McConnell was also featured in a recurring role on the FX series The Riches, and on the HBO series Treme as a (fictional) disc jockey at (real life) radio station WWOZ.

For 11 years McConnell was the #1 afternoon radio personality in the Gulf South, hosting a daily call-in talk show, "The Spud Show", on WWL 870 AM and 105.3 FM.

In early 2019, McConnell began hosting the morning drive show on KKND (FM). Like his earlier show on WWL, it was also called "The Spud Show" but featured music, in the station's classic hits format, and less politics and talk. On September 8, 2020, KKND switched to hot adult contemporary and dropped McConnell's morning show.

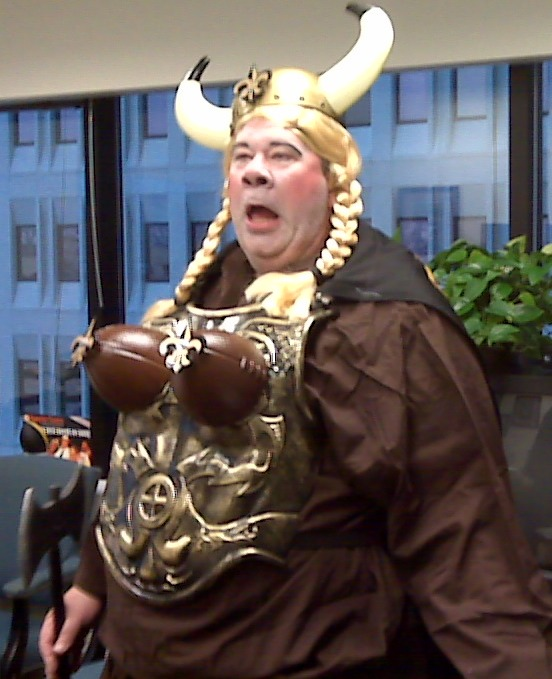
Super Saints fan John "Spud" McConnell, just prior to Super Bowl XLIV

== Filmography ==
=== Film ===
Year	Title	Role	Notes
1990	Miller's Crossing	Officer Bryan	
1991	Firehead	Computer Man	
1991	Convicts	Guard #1	
1992	Delta Heat	LaSalle	
1992	The Lady in Waiting	Extra	Short film
1993	King of the Hill	Patrolman Burns	
1994	Mutant Species	Redneck	
1994	Interview with the Vampire: The Vampire Chronicles	Gambler	
1995	Body Count	Truck Driver	
1995	Born Wild	Sheriff	
1997	Baby Ghost	The Mayor	
2000	Tony Bravo in Scenes from a Forgotten Cinema	Tony "Two Horns"	
2000	O Brother, Where Art Thou?	Woolworths Manager	
2001	Malpractice	Walter	
2001	Above & Beyond	"Whitey"	
2001	Monster's Ball	Harvey Shoonmaker	
2002	Love Liza	High School Principal #1	
2002	Hometown Legend	Rock Hill Coach	
2002	The Scoundrel's Wife	Dance Hall Owner	
2002	Blood Feast 2: All U Can Eat	Detective Loomis	
2002	The Badge	Ornell	
2004	The Ladykillers	Deputy Sheriff	
2004	Mr. 3000	Hall of Fame President	
2005	Because of Winn-Dixie	Store Manager	
2006	Glory Road	Exhibition Game Tournament Director	
2006	The Novice	Luther	
2006	The Last Time	Barney	
2006	Déjà Vu	Sheriff Reed	
2007	Flakes	Ashton Hale	
2007	The Reaping	Mayor Brooks	
2008	Leatherheads	Bullhorn Fireman	
2009	Beyond a Reasonable Doubt	Vernon Green	
2009	Alabama Moon	Mr. Mitchell	
2010	Jonah Hex	Stunk Crick Sheriff	
2011	The Mechanic	Vaughn	
2011	Love, Wedding, Marriage	Grateful Husband	
2011	Colombiana	Smith	
2011	Seeking Justice	Liquor Store Clerk	
2012	Killing Them Softly	Bartender #2	
2012	Abraham Lincoln: Vampire Hunter	Scroll Official	
2012	The Baytown Outlaws	Representative Hawkins	
2012	The Alternatives	Detective Starch	Short film
2012	Stolen	Drunk Businessman	
2012	Django Unchained	Unknown Role	
2013	2 Guns	Officer Dave	
2013	12 Years a Slave	Jonus Ray	
2013	Humidity	Captain Morgan	
2014	Elsa & Fred	Main In Window	
2014	13 Sins	Detective	
2014	Cat Run 2	Guy Mancini	
2014	Black or White	Vertell	
2014	Left Behind	Big Man	
2015	Socialwerk	The Bishop	Short film
2015	Return to Sender	Choking Man	Direct-to-video
2016	Abattoir	McDermott	
2016	The Duel	Saul	
2016	Nigel and Oscar Vs. The Sasquatch	Chuck	

=== Television ===
Year	Title	Role	Notes
1989	False Witness	Police Officer	Television movie
1991	This Gun for Hire	Lieutenant Leoville	Television movie
1991	Doublecrossed	Mr. Lambert	Television movie
1992	Unsolved Mysteries	Huey Long	Episode: 5.3
1995	Jake Lassiter: Justice on the Bayou	Remmy	Television movie
1995	Kingfish: A Story of Huey P. Long	Television movie	
1996	The Big Easy	"Skank"	Episode: "Stodermeyer"
1994-1996	Roseanne	Bob	11 episodes
1997	Orleans	1st FBI Agent	Episode: "Baby-Sitting"
2001	Going to California	Homicidal Elvis	Episode: "Taking Care of Biscuits"
2004	Miracle Run	Unknown Role	Television movie
2004	Pop Rocks	Cop	Television movie
2004	Torn Apart	Detective	Television movie
2004	Growing Pains: Return of the Seavers	Foreman	Television movie
2004	The Brooke Ellison Story	Mr. Jacobs	Television movie
2004	The Madam's Family: The Truth About the Canal Street Brothel	The Bartender	Television movie
2005	Elvis	Disc Jockey	2 episodes
2005	Pizza My Heart	Customer #2	Television movie
2006	The Year Without a Santa Claus	Dog Catcher	Television movie
2007	The Riches	Mick O'Malley	2 episodes
2007	Ruffian	Tony Pappas	Television movie
2009	Midnight Bayou	Oscar	Television movie
2010	Memphis Beat	Karl King	1 episode
2010-2011	Treme	DJ Jeffy Jeff	7 episodes
2015	Scream Queens	Bailiff	1 episodes
2016	Underground	Schafer	2 episodes
2016-2017	Hap and Leonard	Judge Beau Otis	6 episodes
2020	Filthy Rich	Virgil Love	Recurring

=== Stage ===
Opening Date	Production	Role	Theatre	Notes
March 15, 1991	The Kingfish	Huey P. Long	John Houseman Theatre, New York, NY	Also credited as: Designer
January 12, 1993	Henry V	Pistol	Theater at St. Clement's Church, New York, NY	
June 24, 1997	Always...Patsy Cline		Variety Arts Theatre, New York, NY	Production Stage Manager
