= Hoboken Hollow =

- Theatrical release poster
- Directed by: Glen Stephens
- Written by: Glen Stephens
- Produced by: Patrick Durham
- Starring: Jason Connery; Rudolf Martin; C. Thomas Howell; Dedee Pfeiffer; Greg Evigan; Randy Spelling; Matt Cedeño; Robert Carradine; Dennis Hopper; Michael Madsen; Mark Holton
- Cinematography: John-Paul Beeghly
- Edited by: Steven Dieveney
- Music by: Evan Evans
- Production company: Molding Clay Productions
- Distributed by: Pumpjack Entertainment
- Release dates: 17 April 2006 (United Kingdom(DVD premiere); 24 April 2007 (United States, DVD Premiere)
- Running time: 98 minutes
- Country: United States
- Language: English
- Budget: $1.1 million

Hoboken Hollow is a 2006 American horror film directed by Glen Stephens, and starring Jason Connery, Rudolf Martin, C. Thomas Howell, Dedee Pfeiffer, Greg Evigan, Randy Spelling, Matt Cedeño, Robert Carradine, Dennis Hopper and Michael Madsen. It is loosely based on the real-life Texas Slave Ranch.

== Plot ==
As Trevor drifts through Texas he is still haunted by the evils of the war he recently returned from and a promise he failed to keep. When a stranger offers a ride, Trevor finds himself battling the brutal homegrown evil of the Broderick family at Hoboken Hollow, a remote West Texas ranch that many have visited but few ever leave.

== Cast ==
- Jason Connery as Trevor Lloyd
- Rudolf Martin as Howie Beale
- C. Thomas Howell as Clayton Connelly
- Mark Holton as Weldon Brodrick
- Lin Shaye as Mrs. Brodrick
- Randy Spelling as Parker Hilton
- Dennis Hopper as Sheriff Greer
- Michael Madsen as J.T. Goldman
- Robert Carradine as Thad Simmons
- Greg Evigan as Tom Stockwell
- Dedee Pfeiffer as Rhonda Simmons
- Jonathan Fraser as Junior Broderick

== Release ==
=== Home media ===
The film was released on DVD by Slam Dunk on February 19, 2007; later that year on April 24, it was released by Triumph Marketing. On September 29, 2008, it was released by In2Film. It was re-released numerous times by Echo Bridge Entertainment, first as a single-feature on August 3, 2010; and later that year until 2013 as a part of several multi-feature film collections.

== Reception ==
Hoboken Hollow received mostly negative reviews from critics upon its release, with many calling it "exploitive" of the events it was based on. Joe Leydon from Variety panned the film, writing: "Hoboken Hollow may very well be, as its opening credits insist, based on real-life events. But that doesn't prevent this indifferently made and luridly gory exploitation pic from coming off like formulaic fiction of the most repulsive sort". Sean Badgley from The Austin Chronicle gave the film one out of five stars, criticizing the film's one-dimensional and unsympathetic characters, "empty and ineffective" violence, and lack of scares. Phil Davies Brown from Horror Asylum offered the film similar criticism, calling the film "one of the worst films of the year", panning the film's acting, soundtrack, and perceived racism.

Alternately, Geno McGahee from ScaredStiffReviews gave the film a positive review, writing: "Hoboken Hollow proves that you do not need a big budget to create a good film. There is a 1970's feel to this film and it is paced very well, never letting up and building and building until the surprising conclusion".
