= Texas Slave Ranch =

Texas ranch that utilized illegal slave labor in the 1980s

Coordinates: 30.179°N 99.368°W

Location in Texas

The Texas Slave Ranch is the name popularly given to a ranch near Mountain Home, Texas where workers who had been abducted were forced to work without pay making cedar keychains that sold throughout the Texas Hill Country. The ranch was raided in 1984 and the operation shut down.

== Raid and trial ==
On April 6, 1984, more than 30 federal, state and local lawmen raided a 3,500-acre (14 km^{2}) ranch near the Texas Hill Country town of Mountain Home. The officers were responding to reports that workers on the ranch, kidnapped from Interstate 10, were being forced to work and that at least one worker had died and was cremated on the premises. Among the items seized in the search were human bone fragments and audiotapes of torture sessions in which a cattle prod can be heard as it is used to shock the victim. The ranchers were arrested and charged with aggravated kidnapping and the case became widely known as "the Texas Slave Ranch."

The 1986 trial lasted three months, made national news, featured the celebrated Texas defense attorney Richard "Racehorse" Haynes and resulted in the conviction of ranchers Walter Wesley Ellebracht, 55, Walter Ellebracht Jr., 33, and ranch foreman Carlton Robert Caldwell, 21, on charges of conspiracy to commit aggravated kidnapping but acquitted of murder in the death of Anthony Bates, an Alabama man who worked on the ranch in 1984.

There was little physical evidence linking anyone in the death of Bates because a body was never found on the ranch. And though multiple possible murder weapons were present, it was impossible without a body to determine what might have been used to slay Bates .

Prosecutor Ronald Sutton sought life sentences for the three defendants. Walter Ellebracht Sr. received probation, Walter Jr. remained free while his 15-year sentence was appealed and Caldwell served less than three years of his 14-year sentence.

== In popular culture ==
In 2006, Glen Stephens directed the film Hoboken Hollow, which is loosely based on the events that occurred at the Texas Slave Ranch. The film stars Jason Connery, C. Thomas Howell, Dennis Hopper, Greg Evigan, and Michael Madsen.

A book was written about the ranch, The True Story of the Texas Slave Ranch — How a Degenerate Ranching Family Got Away With Murder.
