= Connie Mason =

American model and actress (born 1937)

Playboy centerfold appearance
- June 1963
- Preceded by: Sharon Cintron
- Succeeded by: Carrie Enwright

Personal details
- Born: Connie Snow; August 24, 1937 (age 88) Washington, D.C., U.S.
- Height: 5 ft 8 in (1.73 m)

Connie Mason (born August 24, 1937) is an American model and actress who was Playboy magazine's Playmate of the Month for its June 1963 issue. Mason then acted in the gore movies pioneered by Herschell Gordon Lewis, Blood Feast and Two Thousand Maniacs! Her centerfold was photographed by Pompeo Posar. She was also a Playboy Bunny at the Chicago club.

== Biography ==
Mason was born in 1937 in Washington, D.C. and began her career in the early 1960s. She attended a private school for girls in Danville, Virginia. At the age of 17, she moved to Florida with her family. She was managing the cosmetics department for Jordan Marsh in Miami.

There, her parents went to the opening of the new Playboy Club. They were guests of their friend Tony Roma. Roma suggested to her father (who built custom homes) that his daughter apply to be a bunny at the newly opened Playboy club. Playboy clubs were all the rage across the country and in London, England. He said they were looking for pretty girls with great personalities and good figures. Mason was hired as the "camera bunny" and was a huge hit with all the customers because of her "bubbly personality".

Mason then moved to Chicago and met Hugh Hefner and moved into his mansion and went to work at the club as the bunny photographer. He asked her if she would be interested in testing with the magazine's staff photographer, to be featured as center fold for the popular Playboy magazine. She was chosen by Hefner to be Playboy magazine's Playmate of the Month for its June 1963 issue. Then, one night when she was working, Mason was introduced to fashion designer Oleg Cassini, Jackie Kennedy's personal designer. Cassini encouraged her to come to New York City, where he introduced her to the Eileen Ford Agency. The agency signed Mason, thus beginning a career in fashion modeling and national TV commercials.

Mason was discovered by director Herschell Gordon Lewis in 1963; she was cast in the starring role to work in the horror movie Blood Feast (1963) directed by him the same year. This was followed by the leading part in the film Two Thousand Maniacs! (1964), also directed by Lewis.

She met and married Shelly Kasten in New York City, who was the entertainment director for all the Playboy Clubs. Mason had previously been married to actor Tony Young from 1958 to 1962.

== Filmography ==
- Walk Like a Dragon (1960) (uncredited) as Diane
- Blood Feast (1963) as Suzette Fremont
- Two Thousand Maniacs (1964) as Terry Adams
- Tell Me That You Love Me, Junie Moon (1970) (uncredited) as Extra
- Lovers and Other Strangers (1970) (uncredited) as Extra
- Made for Each Other (1971) (as Connie Snow) as Ingrid
- Diamonds Are Forever (1971) (uncredited) as Woman at Whyte House
- Rolling Man (1972) as Connie
- The Godfather: Part II (1974) (uncredited) as Extra
- Sudden Death (1977) (uncredited)
- Doctors' Private Lives (1978) as Anne
- Tangiers (1982) (uncredited)

== See also ==
- List of people in Playboy 1960–1969

Judi Monterey	Toni Ann Thomas	Adrienne Moreau	Sandra Settani	Sharon Cintron	Connie Mason
Carrie Enwright	Phyllis Sherwood	Victoria Valentino	Christine Williams	Terre Tucker	Donna Michelle
