= Gary Marlowe =

German musician

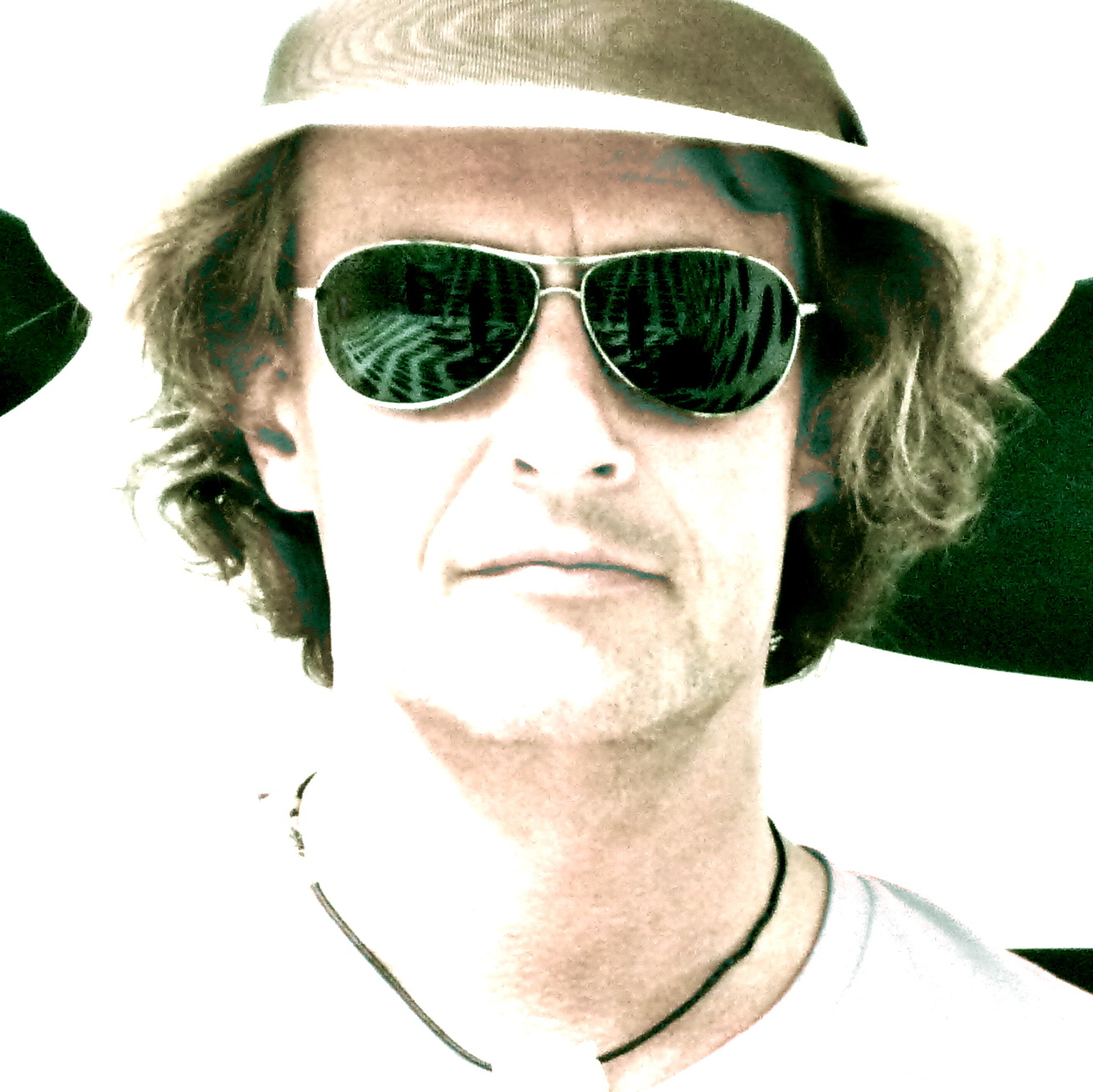
Gary Marlowe (2011)

Gary Marlowe (born March 7, 1967, in Berlin) is a German musician, composer and music producer.

== Life ==
Crystal Pine Award winner Gary Marlowe began playing piano at four. He started as a professional musician in 1980s Berlin, as a composer and synthesizer specialist, and soon went on to become a No.1 hit songwriter and a Gold Record-winning music producer. He studied Composition for Film with the Oscar winners Luis Bacalov and Nicola Piovani at the Accademia Musicale Chigiana in Siena, Italy.

=== Musician, composer and producer ===
With his ensemble Echoes of Space, Gary Marlowe creates immersive 3D Audio live concerts, co-produced with 2025 Grammy winner Hans-Martin Buff (Peter Gabriel).

Gary Marlowe´s body of work includes many record releases, among them a No. 1 hit single and various Top Ten chart entries, recordings with progressive thrash metal acts Coroner and Rage, sharing the stage with Iggy Pop and The Ramones, compositions for art exhibitions like the Biennale di Venezia, and performances with international orchestras such as the Brussels Philharmonic and various Italian ensembles.

Gary Marlowe’s film scores include award-winning features such as “Everything Will Change” (with Wim Wenders), “Lautlos”, “Planeta 5000”, and the documentaries “The Milk System”, “A Place Called Los Pereira”, and “Alcohol”. He also composed music for series like “Inside the Stones” (with Nine Inch Nails and Moby), and the prime time drama series “Tatort”.

In 2018, Gary Marlowe officially received the title Steinway Artist.

In 2025, Gary Marlowe won the Crystal Pine Award at the International Sound and Film Music Festival in Varazdin, Croatia, with his compositions for the film “Hydrogen - Revolution or Illusion?”.

He is a Berlinale Talent Alumnus, a member of the World Soundtrack Academy, the Ivors Academy, and the European Film Academy.

=== Installations ===
Marlowe developed his concept of aural frames, ambient music installations for indoor and outdoor spaces, in collaboration with painters, sculptors and video artists. Those were exhibited also by the Biennale di Venezia (music for a Richard Nonas exhibition) and Scatola Bianca ("requiem | repeat", personal exhibition in collaboration with Gianni Moretti).

== Work and filmography ==
- 2025
  - H2 concept album inspired by “Hydrogen - Revolution or Illusion?” (with ECHOES OF SPACE)
- 2024
  - Hydrogen - Revolution or Illusion? (dir. Andreas Pichler)
  - WINNER CRYSTAL PINE AWARD 2025 INTERNATIONAL SOUND AND FILM MUSIC FESTIVAL
- 2023
  - Gary Marlowe: ECHOES OF SPACE, 3D audio concerts, world premiere at FMF Kraków Festival (prod. Gary Marlowe and Hans-Martin Buff)
- 2022
  - A Special Breakfast (dir. Sarah Timm, Savo Cubrilovic)
- 2021
  - Everything Will Change (dir. Marten Persiel)
  - WINNER 43. FILM FESTIVAL MAX OPHÜLS PREIS 2022
- 2020
  - Alkohol (dir. Andreas Pichler)
  - NOMINATION CRYSTAL PINE AWARDS 2020
  - Tatort: Der Welten Lohn (dir. Gerd Schneider)
  - Planeta 5000 (dir. Carlos Val)
  - WINNER BEST MOVIE, PREMIOS SIMÓN 2020
- 2019
  - Alkohol (dir. Andreas Pichler)
  - NOMINATION CRYSTAL PINE AWARDS 2020
  - Tatort: Für immer und Dich (dir. Julia von Heinz)
  - WINNER DEUTSCHER FERNSEHFILMPREIS 2019
  - Al-Hadira - The Hangar (dir. Eyas Al Mokdad)
- 2018
  - Pete's Last Dance (dir. Benjamin Teske)
- 2017
  - The Milk System / Das System Milch (dir. Andreas Pichler)
  - WINNER 11th International Fünf Seen Film Festival
  - When Paul came over the Sea (dir. Jakob Preuss)
  - WINNER 20th Shanghai International Film Festival
  - NOMINATION BEST FILM MUSIC 38th Max Ophüls Preis Festival
  - NOMINATION BEST FILM MUSIC, 6th GERMAN DOCUMENTARY FILM MUSIC AWARDS 2018
- 2016
  - Strawberry Bubblegums.
  - Scrappin'. Winner 37th Max Ophüls Preis.
  - Sex & Crime.
  - Treffen sich zwei.
- 2015
  - Winnetous Sohn. Winner 31st Warsaw Film Festival.
  - Escape. Jerry Goldsmith Awards 2015 finalist.
- 2014
  - Autumn Tingles: Speed Dating for Silver Hairs. Grimme Preis 2015.
  - Mordsfreunde, Jerry Goldsmith Awards 2014 finalist.
- 2013
  - concert with The Brussels Philharmonic Orchestra in Gent, Belgium.
  - The Old, the Young and the Sea, winner Cologne & Munich Surf Film Festivals, winner Cape Town Wavescape Film Festival.
  - additional music for Houston, in competition at Sundance Festival, winner Hofer Filmtage.
  - Jedes Jahr im Juni.
  - Sogar die Nacht.
  - Jerry Goldsmith Awards finalists.
- 2012
  - UNESCO web series Inside the Stones, music by Nine Inch Nails, Gary Marlowe and Moby.
  - Hollywood Music In Media Awards nomination.
  - Jerry Goldsmith Awards 2012 finalist.
- 2011
  - 1949, German predicate of special merit, Nominee Berlin Shortcutz Awards.
  - Stubbe - Querschläger.
- 2010
  - personal exhibition requiem | repeat, aural frames installation in Venice.
  - Jerry Goldsmith Awards 2010 finalist.
- 2009
  - Heisse Spur.
  - A Place Called Los Pereyra.
  - aural frames installation the forest of st. elena, Venice Art Biennale, Richard Nonas exhibition.
- 2008
  - Das Echo der Schuldl.
- 2007
  - Schuld und Unschuld, three Nominations Film&TV Music Awards in Los Angeles.
- 2006
  - Kunstfehler, Nomination Film&TV Music Awards Los Angeles.
  - Celebration Of Flight, winner Gloria Festival; Thin Line Festival, U.S.A., winner Dijon.
- 2005
  - Lautlos (Soundless), Grand Prix Cognac Film Festival; winner Houston Film Festival, U.S.A.
- 2004
  - Lautlos.
  - Styx.
- 2001
  - Birth:day
- 1999
  - Framed, Nomination Deutscher Filmpreis Award.
- 1998
  - Fool Moon.
- 1995
  - Für mich soll's rote Rosen regnen (music consultant).
- 1987-89
  - Teenage Mutant Ninja Turtles (TV Series) (title song co-producer).
- 1989
  - Vera und Babs (TV Series) (music performance and actor).
  - Die Didi-Show (TV Series) (ZDF).
- 1985
  - Gefahr für die Liebe – AIDS (title song) ... aka A.I.D.S. Trop jeune pour mourir (France).
- 1984
  - The Bear (animated film).

== Awards and nominations ==
Gary Marlowe is a 2025 Crystal Pine Award winner, a five times Jerry Goldsmith Awards Finalist (2015, 2014, 2013, 2012, 2010), and was nominee at the Hollywood Music in Media Awards 2012.

- 2025: “Hydrogen - Revolution or Illusion?”: WINNER CRYSTAL PINE AWARD, INTERNATIONAL SOUND AND FILM MUSIC FESTIVAL, Varazdin, Croatia
- 2022: “Everything Will Change”: WINNER AUDIENCE AWARD 43. FILM FESTIVAL MAX OPHÜLS PREIS 2022
- 2020: “Alkohol”: NOMINATION CRYSTAL PINE AWARDS 2020

“Planeta 5000”: WINNER PREMIOS SIMÓN 2020

- 2019: “TATORT: Für immer und Dich”: WINNER DEUTSCHER FERNSEHFILMPREIS 2019

NOMINATION DEUTSCHER FERNSEHKRIMI PREIS 2019.
NOMINATION GRIMME PREIS 2019 for “When Paul came over the Sea”.

- 2018: NOMINATION BEST FILM MUSIC, 6th German Documentary Film Music Awards.

     Official acknowledgement as a “STEINWAY ARTIST” by Steinway & Sons.

- 2017: “The Milk System”: WINNER 11th International Fünf Seen Film Festival.

WINNER 51st German Economy Film Award 2018, WINNER German Environmental Film Award 2018.

     “When Paul came over the Sea”: WINNER 20th Shanghai International Film Festival.
      NOMINATION BEST FILM MUSIC 38th Filmfestival Max Ophüls Preis, Germany.

- 2017: NOMINATION BEST FILM MUSIC 38th Max Ophüls Preis Festival.
- 2016: “Schrotten!”: Winner 37th Max Ophüls Preis, Germany.
- 2015: “Winnetous Sohn”: Winner 31st Warsaw Film Festival, Poland.

“Autumn Tingles: Speed Dating for Silver Hairs”: Winner Grimme Preis, Germany.
“Mordsfreunde”: Jerry Goldsmith Awards Finalist, Spain.

- 2014: Jerry Goldsmith Awards Finalist for “The Old, the Young & the Sea”.
- 2013: Jerry Goldsmith Awards Finalist for “Sogar die Nacht”.
- 2012: Nomination Hollywood Music In Media Awards as “Best Score Commercial Advertisement”.

Jerry Goldsmith Awards Finalist as “Best Music for Advertisement”.

- 2011: Nomination “Best Original Music”, Berlin Shortcutz Awards, for “1949”.
- 2010: Jerry Goldsmith Awards Finalist with “A Place Called Los Pereyra”.
- 2007: Four nominations for the Film&TV Music Awards in Los Angeles:

Best Use of a Song in a Television Program: Gary Marlowe, “Rise” - “Kunstfehler”
Best Score for a Dramatic TV Program: Gary Marlowe - “Schuld Und Unschuld”
Best Instrumental Performance by an Orchestra: Orchestra Sinfonica di Trieste - “Schuld Und Unschuld”
Best Instrumental Performance by a Soloist in a Film Score: Gary Marlowe - “Schuld und Unschuld”

- 2006: Celebration of Flight: Winner Gloria Film Fest Utah, U.S.A. Winner Thin Line Film Festival, Texas, U.S.A. Grand Prix Audience Dijon Film Festival, France.
- 2005: “Lautlos” won the Grand Prix at the 23rd International Film Festival of Cognac, France.

Platinum Award at the 38th Houston International Film Festival, U.S.A.
The Berlinale Festival chose Gary Marlowe for the “Berlinale Talent Campus”.

- 2003: Winner Emma Contestabile Award.
- 2000: „framed“: Nomination for the Deutscher Filmpreis Award.
- Marlowe had a Europe-wide No.1 hit single and many Top Ten chart entries, as well as international Platinum and Gold Record Awards.
