= Belizaire the Cajun =

1986 film directed by Glen Pitre

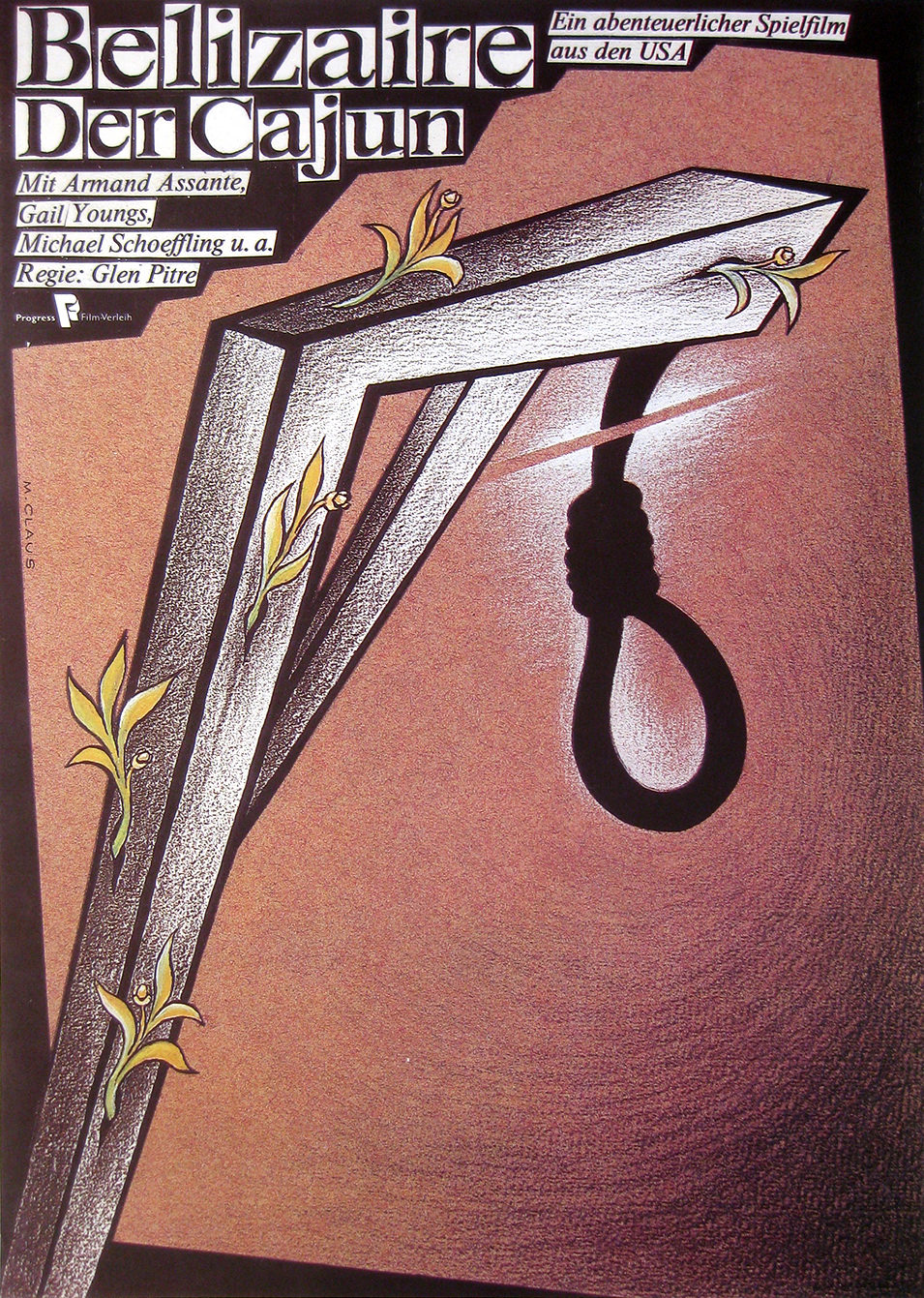
- Poster by Matthias Claus
- Directed by: Glen Pitre
- Written by: Glen Pitre
- Starring: Armand Assante
- Release date: June 13, 1986
- Running time: 103 minutes
- Country: United States
- Language: English
- Box office: $1,142,243

Belizaire the Cajun is a 1986 film directed by Glen Pitre and starring Armand Assante. It was screened in the Un Certain Regard section at the 1986 Cannes Film Festival.

It chronicles the story of Belizaire Breaux, a village healer (traiteur) in Acadiana in 1859, who becomes entangled in a violent conflict between Cajuns and the new Anglophone arrivals to Southwest Louisiana.

== Cast ==
- Armand Assante as Belizaire Breaux
- Gail Youngs as Alida Thibodaux
- Michael Schoeffling as Hypolite Leger
- Stephen McHattie as James Willoughby
- Will Patton as Matthew Perry
- Nancy Barrett as Rebecca
- Loulan Pitre, Sr. as Sheriff
- Andre Delaunay as Dolsin
- Jim Levert as Amadee Meaux
- Ernie Vincent as Old Perry
- Paul Landry as Sosthene
- Allan Durand as Priest
- Robert Duvall as The Preacher
- Bob Edmundson as Head Vigilante
- Charlie Goulas as Vigilante
