= Color Me Blood Red =

- Film poster
- Directed by: Herschell Gordon Lewis
- Written by: Herschell Gordon Lewis
- Produced by: David F. Friedman
- Starring: Gordon Oas-Heim (as Don Joseph); Candi Conder; Elyn Warner; Pat Lee (as Patricia Lee); Jerome Eden
- Cinematography: Herschell Gordon Lewis (as Herschell G. Lewis)
- Edited by: Robert L. Sinise (as Robert Sinise)
- Production company: Box Office Spectaculars
- Distributed by: Box Office Spectaculars
- Release date: October 13, 1965
- Running time: 79 minutes
- Country: United States
- Language: English
- Budget: $50,000 (estimated)

Color Me Blood Red is a 1965 American splatter film written and directed by Herschell Gordon Lewis about a psychotic painter who murders people and uses their blood as paint. It is the third part of what the director's fans have dubbed "The Blood Trilogy," including Blood Feast (1963) and Two Thousand Maniacs! (1964).

== Plot ==
Adam Sorg is a struggling artist who lives at a house near the beach and suffers from anger issues as a result of his critics making fun of his poor use of color. He thus often takes out his frustrations on those around him, chief among them his girlfriend, Gigi. Adam's struggles are mainly derived from his inability to find the perfect shade of red.

One day, local gallerist Mr. Farnsworth has a meeting with Adam at Adam's house, which ends after Adam smashes one of his paintings in frustration. After Farnsworth leaves, Gigi accidentally cuts her finger on a nail whilst picking up the broken painting, and she stains the painting with her blood. Suddenly, Adam realizes that this is the red tinge he's been looking for, and he asks Gigi to spill more of her blood from her wound. She reluctantly does so, and he immediately begins working on an unfinished painting using her blood. As his obsession grows more and more, Adam cuts his fingers with a razor blade to obtain more blood, and he continues working feverishly until he collapses from anemia.

The next day, Gigi chastises Adam over his usage of blood for paint and also gets mad at him for coaxing Farnsworth into giving a positive review of a painting of his that he hasn't even finished. In a fit of rage, Adam stabs Gigi with a painting knife, killing her, before proceeding to use her blood to finish his painting. The next morning, after disposing of Gigi's body, Adam heads to the gallery and unveils his new painting to Farnsworth. Art critic Gregorovich, who had previously considered Adam unworthy as a painter, offers high praise and declares it to be Adam's masterpiece, and he asks Adam to create another painting.

Returning home, Adam prepares to draw blood for his new work of art, when he sees a couple out on the beach riding his own hydrocycles. Adam gets into a motorboat and speeds after the couple, murdering them and using their blood to create a new painting that he exhibits at the gallery the next morning.

Some time later, local teenage girl April Carter goes on a trip to the beach with her boyfriend, Rolf, and her friends Jack and Sydney. Whilst getting changed, April encounters Adam, whom she recognises. She tells him about how her mother has been desperate to purchase one of Adam's paintings, despite his repeated claims that they are "not for sale". Adam tells April that he is "looking for a model", and that he will give her mother a painting of his for free if she poses for his latest work. After some consideration, April agrees. After letting her inside, Adam ties April's wrists to a rope suspended over a ceiling beam, telling her that it will help her hold the desired pose.

Meanwhile, Jack and Sydney end up discovering Gigi's decomposing corpse in the sand, and Rolf goes to the house to call the police. There, he discovers a crazed Adam preparing to kill April with an axe. In the ensuing scuffle, Rolf grabs a shotgun from the mantle and shoots Adam in the face, killing him. The scene fades to Farnsworth burning one of Adam's paintings, which mysteriously appears to bleed as the movie ends.

== Cast ==
- Gordon Oas-Heim as Adam Sorg
- Candi Conder as April Carter
- Iris Marshall as Mrs. Carter
- Elyn Warner as Gigi
- Scott H. Hall as Mr. Farnsworth
- William Harris as Gregorovich
- Jerome Eden as Rolf
- Pat Finn-Lee as Sydney
- Jim Jaekel as Jack

== Production ==
During the making of Color Me Blood Red, Lewis and Friedman considered making a fourth "Blood" film to be titled Suburban Roulette. Friedman felt that the "super blood and gore" film market was nearing the saturation point, and he decided to stop working on the series.

When asked about acting in an interview, Lewis related a brief note about Gordon Oas-Heim, who had appeared in a key role for this film along with Moonshine Mountain (1964) for Lewis. He described him as "a fine acting talent but an impossible personality" when it came to trying to get as much filming done as possible.

== Critical reception ==
Allmovie called the film dull and lacking in comparison with Lewis' two previous efforts; "very little distinguishes Color Me Blood Red from its parent productions except a lack of enthusiasm, brashness, and irreverence, something that can't be said for the remainder of Lewis' oeuvre."

== See also ==
- List of American films of 1965
