= The Scoundrel's Wife =

- DVD cover
- Directed by: Glen Pitre
- Written by: Glen Pitre; Michelle Benoit
- Produced by: Jerry Daigle; Peggy Rajski
- Starring: Tatum O'Neal; Julian Sands; Tim Curry
- Cinematography: Uta Briesewitz
- Edited by: Peter B. Ellis
- Music by: Ernest Troost
- Production companies: Advantage Partners Pictures; Circle in the Sky Productions; Cote Blanche; Heritage Entertainment
- Distributed by: Miracle Entertainment
- Release dates: March 9, 2002 (SXSW); April 4, 2003 (United States)
- Running time: 102 minutes
- Country: United States
- Language: English

The Scoundrel's Wife (U.S. video title: The Home Front) is a 2002 romantic drama film directed by Glen Pitre, who co-wrote screenplay with Michelle Benoit, and starring by Tatum O'Neal, Julian Sands and Tim Curry.

== Plot ==
The Scoundrel's Wife tells the story of a woman suspected of being a saboteur, who struggles to raise two children in a small village during World War II. The film is a period drama which takes place in Louisiana at the beginning of U.S. entry into World War II. A certain military is looking for the Germans who are sinking America's ships off the coast and fishermen who are trading goods.

== Cast ==
- Tatum O'Neal as Camille Picou
- Julian Sands as Doctor Lenz
- Tim Curry as Father Antoine
- Lacey Chabert as Florida Picou
- Eion Bailey as Ensign Jack Burwell
- Patrick McCullough as Blue Picou
- Rudolf Martin as Neg Picou
- Lorna Farrar as Shrimp Shed Owner
- John McConnell as Dance Hall Owner
- Lance Spellerberg as Beaten P.W.
- Kurt Gerard as Snake-bit P.W.
- Michael Arata as Coast Guard Commander
