= Rudolf Martin =

German actor (born 1967)

- Born: 31 July 1967 (age 59); West Berlin, West Germany (de facto)
- Occupation: Actor
- Years active: 1993–present
- Spouse: Katherine LaPlant
- Website: www.rudolfmartin.com

Rudolf Martin (born 31 July 1967) is a German actor working mainly in the United States. He first appeared in off-Broadway productions and then moved on to extensive TV and film work. He has made guest appearances on numerous hit television series and recently started working in Germany as well. He currently resides in Los Angeles.

== Early life and education ==
Martin was born in West Berlin and spent his early years traveling throughout Europe while completing his education. Because of his interest in the arts, Martin studied American and English literature in Berlin and drama in Paris. He then enrolled in the Lee Strasberg Theatre Institute in New York City to pursue acting. While performing in small theatre productions, Martin secured a starring role in Susan Seidelman's Academy Award-nominated short film The Dutch Master. This was followed by leading roles on ABC's All My Children and Off-Broadway in Nicky Silver's critically acclaimed hit comedy The Food Chain. While in New York, Martin received recognition for his work in independent films such as Fall, High Art and When.

== Career ==
After arriving in Los Angeles in 1999, he appeared in the Warner Brothers thriller Swordfish starring John Travolta, Hugh Jackman, Halle Berry and Don Cheadle. In the film Martin plays Axl Torvalds, an internationally renowned computer hacker who leads FBI agents on the trail of a criminal mastermind. Based on his performance in Swordfish, Martin was offered a role in the German thriller Soundless.

Before Swordfish Martin played a role in the original Showtime series Beggars and Choosers, an inside look at the television networks developed by Peter Lefcourt and Brandon Tartikoff that was popular within the entertainment industry. Martin played "Nikolai Krasnakov", the charming but dangerous Russian mobster whose life was to be developed into a mini-series by the fictional network. Martin played the exuberant young mobster for the entire two seasons.

Martin then moved to Hollywood and has since appeared in the 20th Century Fox's comedy Bedazzled, the Warner Brothers film White Oleander, Patrik Ian Polk’s edgy comedy Punks that was nominated for an Independent Spirit Award, as well as in the independent feature The Scoundrel's Wife, starring Tatum O'Neal, Tim Curry and Julian Sands.

Martin portrayed the title character Vlad Dracula in the USA film Dark Prince: The True Story of Dracula. The film was shot in 2000 on authentic locations in Romania and tells the story of Prince Vlad III Dracula, "the Impaler" (1431–1476), who inspired the name of Bram Stoker's fictional vampire count. Peter Weller, Jane March and Roger Daltrey co-starred in Dark Prince, which premiered in October 2000. Martin then guest-starred as the fictional Count Dracula on the fifth season premiere of Buffy the Vampire Slayer ("Buffy vs. Dracula") alongside his previous All My Children co-star Sarah Michelle Gellar. Rudolf Martin proceeded to guest-star in five episodes of the Fox thriller 24 in which he played two different characters, one of them impersonating the other.

He has also guest starred in other television dramas, notably Judging Amy, Crossing Jordan and in CSI: Crime Scene Investigation as a serial killer motivated by Shakespearean sonnets, as well as Mossad agent Ari Haswari, the antagonist to Mark Harmon on the hit show NCIS for seasons 1–2 until that character's violent death. Also released is the independent feature film River's End, shot on location in Texas.

Martin's main focus remains on working in film; as a European actor, he continues to appear in European productions as well. He had his second lead performance in the film: Bloodlines, the story of a young man coming to terms with his newly discovered family in Slovakia. Bloodlines was shot in San Francisco and Slovakia in 2003.

He is a cast member in Hoboken Hollow, an independent feature with C. Thomas Howell, Dennis Hopper and Michael Madsen and in another German feature, Paparazzo shooting in France and Spain. In Stargate SG-1 he had a guest appearance in the episode "Company of Thieves" in Season 10 as Anateo of the Lucian Alliance. He also has a guest appearance in three episodes of Dexter as drug lord Carlos Guerrero. Currently (as of 2006) completed is Last Exit and Hyenas and the short movie Sunrise.

In 2011, he played the character of Tormento Lancie in the video interludes for Britney Spears' Femme Fatale Tour. Martin's character is a stalker set out to eliminate Spears as the Femme Fatale.

== Filmography ==
=== Film ===
- The Dutch Master (1993, Short) (Susan Seidelman) - Dutch Man with Pipe
- Run for Cover (1995) - Mr. Spengel
- Café Babel (1995, Short) - Lover (he)
- Tales of Erotica (1996) - (segment "The Dutch Master")
- Fall (1997) - Phillipe
- High Art (1998) - Dieter
- When (1999) - Alain
- Watershed (1999) - Richard Petrovic
- Punks (2000) - Gilbert
- Bedazzled (2000) - Raoul
- Swordfish (2001) - Axl Torvalds
- The Scoundrel's Wife (a.k.a. Home Front) (2002) - Neg Picou
- Soundless (2004, German Movie) - Der junge Polizist
- Bloodlines (2004) - Martin
- River's End (2005) - Alejandro
- Hoboken Hollow (2006) - Howie Beale
- Two Nights (2007, Short) - Frank
- Last Exit (2008)
- The Hitchhiking Game (2008, Short) - Man
- Sunrise (2008)
- Raven (2009) - Lazar
- Pig (2011) - Man
- Hyenas (2011) - Sheriff Manfred
- The Stand-In (2011, Short) - Jan De Groot
- The Collector (2012, Short) - Francis
- Taking Capellera (2012) - Volden
- Bela Kiss: Prologue (2013) - Bela Kiss
- 3 Holes and a Smoking Gun (2014) - Junkie
- Near Myth: The Oskar Knight Story (2016) - Himself
- Fucking Berlin (2016) - Dr. Carl Brenner
- Crossing (2019) - Andrei
- Ford v Ferrari (2019) - Dieter Voss

=== Television ===
- All My Children (1994–1995) - Anton Lang
- Sliders (1999) - Kurtz
- Beggars and Choosers (1999–2001) - Nicky Krasnakov
- Buffy the Vampire Slayer (2000) - Dracula
- Dark Prince: The True Story of Dracula (2000, TV Movie) - Vlad Dracula the Impaler
- 24 (2001-2002) - Jonathan Matijevich / Martin Belkin
- Star Trek: Enterprise (2002, Episode: "Two Days and Two Nights") - Ravis
- Judging Amy (2003) - Cell Phone Imbecile
- CSI: Crime Scene Investigation (2003) - Cameron Klinefeld
- CSI: Miami (2004) - Rudy
- NCIS (2004–2012) - Ari Haswari
- Crossing Jordan (2005) - Albie Samson
- Stargate SG-1 (2006) - Anateo
- Dexter (2006) - Carlos Guerrero
- Paparazzo (2007, German TV movie) - Raoul
- Moonlight (2007) - Christian Ellis
- Mad Men (2008) - Christian
- Cry No More (2009, German TV Movie) - True Gallagher
- Spear of Destiny (2010, German TV Movie) - Johannes Erlanger
- Nikita (2011) - Gustav
- Borgia (2011) - Francheschetto Cibo
- The Mentalist (2012) - Brock Marx
- S.W.A.T (2017) - Jürgen Richter
- FBI (2025) - Oslo
