= Two Thousand Maniacs! =

1964 American horror film by Herschell Gordon Lewis

- Theatrical release poster
- Directed by: Herschell Gordon Lewis
- Written by: Herschell Gordon Lewis
- Produced by: David F. Friedman
- Starring: William Kerwin; Connie Mason; Jeffrey Allen
- Cinematography: Herschell Gordon Lewis
- Edited by: Robert Sinise
- Music by: Herschell Gordon Lewis
- Production company: David F. Friedman-Herschell G. Lewis Production
- Distributed by: Box Office Spectaculars
- Release date: April 3, 1964 (Salisbury, North Carolina)
- Running time: 88 minutes
- Country: United States
- Language: English
- Budget: $60,000–$80,000

Two Thousand Maniacs! is a 1964 American supernatural splatter film written and directed by Herschell Gordon Lewis and starring William Kerwin, Connie Mason, Jeffrey Allen, Ben Moore, and Gary Bakeman. It follows a group of Northern tourists who are savagely tortured and murdered during a ghostly Confederate celebration of a small Georgia community's centennial. The story was inspired by the 1947 Lerner and Loewe musical Brigadoon, which also features a spectral town that manifests once every 100 years, populated by ghosts of its past inhabitants.

Shot in Florida and released in mid-1964, Two Thousand Maniacs! screened largely at drive-in theaters, and performed particularly well in the Southern United States. The film was met with some controversy due to its graphic depiction of violence, receiving significant cuts by the Motion Picture Association of America (MPAA) and being banned in the city of Chicago by the local police department and film board. Despite this, the film proved to be a financial success, and remained in circulation at drive-in theaters in the United States through the 1970s.

Two Thousand Manaics! has been noted by critics as an early example of hicksploitation in exploitation films, as well as for its sensationalizing of national perceptions between the North and South. The theme of social class differences between the regions has been cited as a prominent feature of the film. It also contains elements of supernatural horror, and its structure has been acknowledged as an influence on the contemporary slasher film.

The film was preceded by Lewis's Blood Feast (1963) and followed by Color Me Blood Red (1965), as part of what Lewis and film scholars have described as the director's "Splatter Trilogy." A remake titled 2001 Maniacs was released in 2005.

== Plot ==
In 1964, two rednecks named Rufus and Lester use detour signs to lure six young tourists into their rural town of Pleasant Valley, Georgia. Upon their arrival, the six are warmly welcomed by the townsfolk, and are introduced to some of them, including Rufus, Lester, and town mayor Earl Buckman. The tourists are invited to be "guests of honor" for their centennial celebration being held over the weekend. The mayor promises to provide the tourists complimentary hotel rooms, free food, and entertainment throughout the celebration, and the visitors decide to go along with it.

That night, while one of the tourists, Bea Miller, is alone in her hotel room, she gets a call from local store owner Harper, who invites her to take a walk with him. She accepts the invitation and he leads her into the woods nearby, where he suddenly takes out a knife and cuts off one of her fingers. Bea is then accosted by Buckman, Rufus, and Lester. As the other three hold her down, Rufus hacks off her arm with an axe, killing her.

Meanwhile, two other tourists, Tom White and his girlfriend Terry Adams, have growing suspicions about the town. During a barbecue later that night (where, unbeknownst to the tourists, Bea's arm is being slowly spit-roasted), Tom quietly leads Terry away to a plaque he found in the woods, which states that a group of renegade Union soldiers massacred much of the Pleasant Valley townsfolk near the end of the Civil War in 1865. They realize that this "centennial" is really an act of revenge for the destruction of the town one hundred years ago, and that they and the other tourists are the intended victims. Buckman, Rufus, and Lester spot Tom and Terry and chase the couple, but they manage to escape.

Meanwhile, back at the festivities, Harper's girlfriend Betsy gets Bea's husband John drunk on moonshine while the final two tourists, David and Beverly Wells, secretly watch. After Harper escorts the couple back to the hotel, the townspeople surround John and tie both his arms and legs to four horses that are sent running in different directions, dismembering him.

The next morning, Betsy takes David to a gathering on a hill near the lake. Rufus and another man force David into a barrel, which Mayor Buckman hammers nails into before rolling it down the hill, killing David. Later, Lester brings Beverly to the town square to be the judge for the next event, a dunk tank-esque attraction, but one which has a boulder instead of a water tank. Beverly is forcibly tied down to the platform and crowd members take turns throwing rocks at the target. Lester eventually manages to hit the target, releasing the boulder and causing it to crush Beverly to death.

Meanwhile, Tom and Terry attempt to sneak out of the hotel, but Harper sees them and gives chase. They run through a nearby swamp, where Harper gets stuck in a pool of quicksand and apparently sinks to his death. Eventually, Tom and Terry manage to locate their car and escape the town, as Mayor Buckman deems the centennial a success and declares the celebration over.

Tom and Terry reach a police station and tell the sheriff about what happened. The police chief accompanies them to Pleasant Valley, only to find that the town has mysteriously vanished. The chief becomes skeptical of their claims, but then recalls a local rumor that claims that the vengeful spirits of those killed in the 1865 massacre still haunt the area where the town once stood. The film ends with the ghosts of Rufus, Lester, and Harper heading towards the woods and disappearing, while looking forward to the bicentennial, to be hosted in 2065.

== Cast ==
- William Kerwin (credited as Thomas Wood) as Tom White
- Connie Mason as Terry Adams
- Taalkeus Blank (credited as Jeffrey Allen) as Mayor Buckman
- Ben Moore as Lester MacDonald
- Gary Bakeman as Rufus Tate
- Jerome Eden as John Miller
- Shelby Livingston as Bea Miller
- Michael Korb as David Wells
- Yvonne Gilbert as Beverly Wells
- Stanley Dyrector (credited as Mark Douglas) as Harper Alexander
- Linda Cochran as Betsy
- Vincent Santo as Billy
- Andy Wilson as the policeman
- The Pleasant Valley Boys as themselves

== Production ==
=== Casting ===
Connie Mason, a former Playboy Playmate who had previously starred in Lewis's Blood Feast (1963) was cast in the lead role of Terry Adams. The film was the feature film debut of a nonprofessional Illinois stage actor named Taalkeus Blank (1910-1991; nicknamed "Talky" his entire life) who played Pleasant Valley Mayor Buckman. He used the pseudonym "Jeffery Allen" in all of his film appearances because he was never a member of the Screen Actors Guild. Director Lewis was so impressed by Blank's ability to perfectly mimic any type of Southern accent that he hired Blank to appear in many of his later films, among them Moonshine Mountain (1964), This Stuff'll Kill Ya! (1971) and Year of the Yahoo! (1972), playing various Southern-accented characters under the Jeffrey Allen pseudonym. Similarly, actor William Kerwin was credited as Thomas Wood to avoid restrictions from SAG.

=== Filming ===
Two Thousand Maniacs! was filmed over the course of approximately 12 days in the fall of 1963 in St. Cloud, Florida. According to a contemporary report, the entire town participated in the film. Principal photography began on November 3, 1963. Per a November 4, 1963 newspaper report, filming was scheduled to complete in mid-November 1963. The film's budget was estimated at between $60,000 and $80,000, a sum much larger than what Lewis had on his previous films.

The film's budget was considerably larger than what the filmmakers had previously had to work with, and afforded the film a more polished production. The film's elaborate murder scenes required significant special effects contributions, including a boulder made out of paper maché which falls from a platform and crushes the Beverly character. Lewis recalled the making of the film as an enjoyable experience, despite some camera and recording malfunctions.

== Music ==
Two Thousand Maniacs! features musical performances by the Orlando-based bluegrass country group The Pleasant Valley Boys, who appear throughout the film often narrating the aftermath of the events and murders depicted through song. The group perform the film's opening song and theme, "The South's Gonna Rise Again". Lewis helped compose the songs performed by the group.

== Release ==
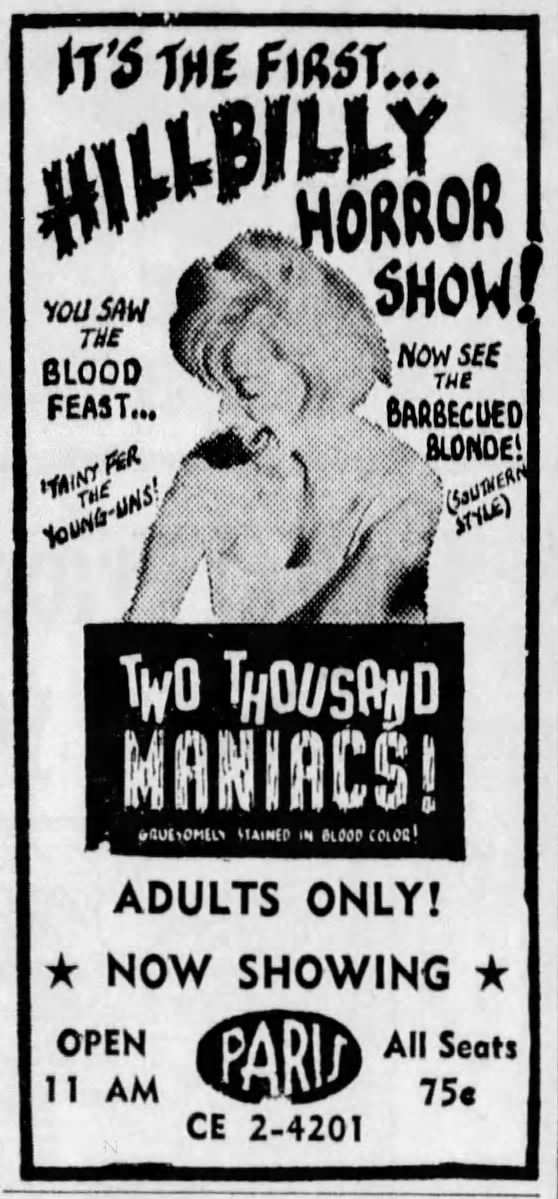
Newspaper advertisement for the film in The Greenville News, May 1964

Two Thousand Maniacs! was mostly screened at American drive-in theaters, especially in the Southern United States, where it did considerably well. Among its earliest releases was on April 3, 1964 in Salisbury, North Carolina. It later opened on October 1, 1964, in Denver, Colorado, and screened as a first-run drive-in feature in Oakland, California beginning November 22, 1964. It continued screening in North Carolina through December 1964.

The film remained in circulation at American drive-ins through the 1970s, sometimes screening with Lewis's other films Blood Feast and Color Me Blood Red. (Note: The film was in circulation screening at drive-in theaters in various U.S. states throughout the 1970s.)

=== Censorship ===
Two Thousand Maniacs! was heavily cut by the MPAA before its release, which resulted in the film receiving limited and inconsistent screenings in the United States.

On August 3, 1964, the film was banned in the city of Chicago by the local police department due to its excessive violence, an effort that was upheld by the Chicago Motion Picture Appeals Board. It was eventually released in Chicago in late 1966.

=== Home media ===
Something Weird Video released Two Thousand Maniacs! on DVD in 2001. Image Entertainment, in association with Something Weird Video, issued a Blu-ray edition on September 27, 2011 as part of Lewis's "Blood Trilogy," paired with Blood Feast (1963) and Color Me Blood Red (1965).

In 2016, Arrow Films released a Blu-ray edition as part of a multi-film box set spanning Lewis's career, titled The Herschell Gordon Lewis Feast. This release earned a Saturn Award nomination for Best DVD or Blu-ray Collection at the 43rd Saturn Awards. Arrow released a standalone Blu-ray edition of the film on May 15, 2018, featuring various new and archival bonus features. The disc also includes an additional film by Lewis, Moonshine Mountain, which was released the same year as Two Thousand Maniacs!.

== Reception ==
=== Box office ===
Though no official box office figures are known to exist, the financial returns for Two Thousand Maniacs! "proved spectacular, prompting Lewis and Friedman to continue with Color Me Blood Red (1964)."

=== Critical response ===
On the review aggregator website Rotten Tomatoes, 45% of 20 critics' reviews are positive. The website's consensus reads: "It didn't take much to thrill early splatter fans, and Two Thousand Maniacs! proves it with its shrill soundtrack, basement-level theatrics, and goofy flesh-tearing gore."

AllMovie wrote, "drive-in gore king Herschell Gordon Lewis reached a creative peak with this darkly comic slaughterfest". In a retrospective, Marjorie Baumgarten of the Austin Chronicle called the film "remarkably durable" and referred to it as "one of the sickest movies ever made."

=== Analysis and themes ===
Two Thousand Maniacs! was one of the early films to introduce audiences to the formulaic plot of Southern gore films: Northern outsiders who are stranded in the rural South are horrifically murdered by virulent, backwoods Southerners. This subgenre of exploitation peaked with the release of Tobe Hooper's The Texas Chain Saw Massacre (1974), and Two Thousand Maniacs! has been credited as being influential on Hooper's film. The theme of social class between these two regions of the United States has been noted as a significant element of the film.

During the Civil Rights Movement in the United States, television and mainstream narrative films used the "rednecks" caricature rather than a realistic depiction of white Southerners like the televised news of the era. However, Lewis' plotline in Two Thousand Maniacs! focused on the ghosts of a violent, vengeful Confederacy, and acknowledged the region's violent history and place in the anxiety of the rest of the United States. The film has been noted by scholars as sensationalizing historical anxieties that the rest of the nation held toward the South's history (and that of its white inhabitants) of extra-legal violence, perceived primitivism, and unresolved regional conflict. Scholar Jacqueline Pinkowitz writes of the film's portrayal of its murderous Confederate characters:

Ben Moore, Gary Bakeman, and Mark Douglas perform their redneck Confederate characters in a highly exaggerated, grotesque manner, wildly rolling their eyes and leering down at their female victims, whooping and hollering the Rebel yell—“yeeeeehah!”—as they maniacally dispatch each victim, with increasing blood and sadism, for the “cause” of Southern revenge. Though these three represent the worst possible manifestation of this horrifying stereotype, acting as the repressed id of the Confederate South, Maniacs extends these negative characterizations of the hillbilly to the whole Southern town of Pleasant Valley.

In his essay "Remapping Southern Hospitality", Anthony Szczesiul explained the film's use of Southern hospitality and other Southern stereotypes: "The film's ironic parody of southern hospitality highlights the performative nature of the discourse. When Mayor Buckman delivers his promise of southern hospitality in his thick, cartoonish accent, the reference is immediately recognizable to all–the characters in the film, its actors and director, its original audience, and by us today–but here the possibility of southern hospitality is transformed into a cruel joke: the visitor becomes victim. Film scholar Kjetil Rødje similarly notes that the film delineates stark social differences between the southern and northern characters, writing that it "plays upon antagonistic relations between the poor rural south and urban middle-class north... These lines of dialogue underline the class distinctions that characterize the portrayals of the victims."

== Legacy ==
Due to its structure, Two Thousand Maniacs! has been acknowledged as a predecessor to the modern slasher film. In Sixties Shockers: A Critical Filmography of Horror Cinema, 1960-1969 (2025), film scholars Mark Clark and Bryan Senn describe Two Thousand Maniacs! as "Lewis's most ambitious and entertaining picture." Lewis himself cited the film as his personal favorite work in his filmography.

Lux Interior, vocalist of The Cramps and a horror film enthusiast, praised the film as "An all-time great because of all the sadism. The people who act in the movie actually live in the town where it was filmed—they look very inbred. There's a wonderful scene where they take this sexy girl and drop this 2,000lb. rock on her from 20 feet, and the whole town's out there watching. Old ladies all looking, like, 'What are we doing here?'"

The 1980s alternative rock band 10,000 Maniacs took their name in homage to the film as a way of making them stand out from other bands on the college rock scene. The John Waters film Multiple Maniacs is named in homage to the film, as well.

== See also ==
- List of American films of 1964
- List of ghost films

== Sources ==
- Clark, Mark; Senn, Bryan (2025). Sixties Shockers: A Critical Filmography of Horror Cinema, 1960-1969. Jefferson, North Carolina: McFarland & Company. ISBN 978-1-476-69885-4.
- Cloke, Paul; Little, Jo, eds. (1996). Contested Countryside Cultures: Rurality and Socio-cultural Marginalisation. Abingdon, England: Routledge. ISBN 978-0-415-14075-1.
- Doll, Susan; Morrow, David (2007). Florida on Film: The Essential Guide to Sunshine State Cinema & Locations. Gainesville, Florida: University Press of Florida. ISBN 978-0-8130-3045-6.
- Edwards, Matthew (2018). "The 2001st Maniac: An Interview with Herschell Gordon Lewis". In Edwards, Matthew (ed.). Film Out of Bounds: Essays and Interviews on Non-Mainstream Cinema Worldwide. Jefferson, North Carolina: McFarland & Company. pp. 40–49. ISBN 978-1-476-60780-1.
- Graham, Alison (2001). Framing the South: Hollywood, Television, and Race during the Civil Rights Struggle. Baltimore: Johns Hopkins UP. ISBN 0-8018-7445-9.
- Hogan, David J. (2010) [1986]. Dark Romance: Sexuality in the Horror Film. Jefferson, North Carolina: McFarland & Company. ISBN 978-0-786-46248-3.
- Hutchings, Peter (2018). Historical Dictionary of Horror Cinema. Lanham, Maryland: Rowman & Littlefield. ISBN 979-8-216-23921-5.
- Kawin, Bruce F. (2012). Horror and the Horror Film. London, England: Anthem Press. ISBN 978-0-857-28241-5.
- Palmer, Randy (2015) [2006]. Herschell Gordon Lewis, Godfather of Gore: The Films. Jefferson, North Carolina: McFarland & Company. ISBN 978-1-476-60464-0.
- Peary, Danny (2014). Cult Horror Movies: Discover the 33 Best Scary, Suspenseful, Gory, and Monstrous Cinema Classics. New York City, New York: Workman Publishing Company. ISBN 9780761181705.
- Pinkowitz, Jacqueline (June 17, 2016). "Down South: Regional Exploitation Films, Southern Audiences, and Hillbilly Horror in Herschell Gordon Lewis's Two Thousand Maniacs! (1964)". Journal of Popular Film and Television. 44 (2). Taylor & Francis: 109–119. doi:10.1080/01956051.2015.1089831.
- Quarles, Mike (2010). Down and Dirty: Hollywood's Exploitation Filmmakers and Their Movies. Jefferson, North Carolina: McFarland & Company. ISBN 978-0-786-41142-9.
- Rockoff, Adam (2016). Going to Pieces: The Rise and Fall of the Slasher Film, 1978-1986. Jefferson, North Carolina: McFarland & Company. ISBN 978-0-786-49192-6.
- Rødje, Kjetil (2016). Images of Blood in American Cinema: The Tingler to The Wild Bunch. New York City, New York: Routledge. ISBN 978-1-317-11878-7.
- Romer, Jean-Claude (2000). "A Bloody New Wave in the United States (July 1964)". Horror Film Reader. New York: Limelight Editions. ISBN 0-87910-297-7.
- Szczesiul, Anthony (August 2007). "Re-mapping Southern Hospitality: Discourse, Ethics, Politics". European Journal of American Culture. 26 (2). Bristol, England: Intellect Books: 127–141. doi:10.1386/ejac.26.2.127_1.
- Towlson, Jon (2014). Subversive Horror Cinema: Countercultural Messages of Films from Frankenstein to the Present. Jefferson, North Carolina: McFarland & Company. ISBN 978-1-476-61533-2.
