= Buffy vs. Dracula =

- Buffy the Vampire Slayer episode
- Episode no.: Season 5 Episode 1
- Directed by: David Solomon
- Written by: Marti Noxon
- Production code: 5ABB01
- Original air date: September 26, 2000

Guest appearances
- Rudolf Martin as Dracula; Michelle Trachtenberg as Dawn Summers; Amber Benson as Tara Maclay; Kristine Sutherland as Joyce Summers; E.J. Gage as Mover #1; Scott Berman as Mover #2; Marita Schaub as Vampire Girl #1; Leslee Jean Matta as Vampire Girl #2; Jennifer Slimko as Vampire Girl #3

Episode chronology
← Previous "Restless"	Next → "Real Me"
- Buffy the Vampire Slayer season 5

"Buffy vs. Dracula" is the season 5 premiere of the television series Buffy the Vampire Slayer. The episode aired on September 26, 2000 on The WB.

Buffy faces the infamous Count Dracula, who has come to Sunnydale to make her one of his brides. In the process, he turns Xander into a Renfield of sorts, and Giles becomes enthralled with the three sisters, much like Jonathan Harker in the novel. However, after a brief spell during which Buffy is mesmerized by the Count, she regains her usual composure and defeats him.

== Plot ==
On a stormy day, two men deliver a large crate to a residence, but when they drop it, a clawed hand breaks through the wood and attacks one of the men.

Giles has Willow start scanning books into a computer so that they can be resources for the gang to use. He then tells her that he is going back to England, but to keep it a secret, as he feels like Buffy and the gang no longer need him.

While patrolling, Buffy is confronted by a vampire who condenses from mist: he introduces himself as none other than Count Dracula himself. Buffy is starstruck, but when she tries to stake the legendary vampire, he disappears. Xander and Willow arrive to see Dracula before he turns into a bat and flies away. The women discuss how amazing Dracula is, and Riley and Xander both express their jealousy towards the infamous Dark Prince. Willow attempts to attract attention to Giles and his usefulness, but the gang seems oblivious.

As Xander is walking home alone, he encounters Dracula. Using his mysterious charms, the vampire persuades Xander to be his aide and lure the Slayer to him. Riley asks Spike about Dracula, but Spike warns him that Dracula is too dangerous for him to take on alone. Buffy awakens to find Dracula in her bedroom, as Joyce had earlier invited him into their home. She is helpless against his powers and unable to stop him from biting her. When she wakes the next morning, she hides the puncture marks in her neck with a scarf.

Later, the gang discusses their plan of attack. Buffy seems distracted and after hearing about the truths of Dracula, she leaves abruptly. Riley follows her and forces her to take off the scarf to show the puncture marks on her neck. Everyone is shocked to see that she has been under the control of Dracula. Since Xander is under Dracula's power, he has a strange hunger for bugs and attempts to defend the powerful vampire to his friends. Xander volunteers to have Buffy stay safely at his place, Willow and Tara use magic to protect the Summers home, and Giles and Riley search Dracula, who according to Spike will live in a mansion or castle.

Xander locks Anya in the closet and takes the willing Slayer to his "Master" in hopes of getting immortality in return. After being left alone with Dracula, Buffy tries to take control and stake him, but he is easily able to make her put the stake down, telling her about the things he can do for her while she struggles to regain control of herself. As Giles and Riley arrive at the castle, Xander tries to stop them from going after Dracula, but Riley knocks him out with one punch, while Giles finds himself seduced by the Three Sisters. Dracula offers his blood to Buffy, and she hesitantly takes a drink. A flash of Slayer memories allows Buffy to break his control over her. Riley rescues a reluctant Giles from the vampire sisters, and they go to save Buffy. Buffy and Dracula fight, and finally Buffy stakes him. After they leave, Dracula comes back from the dust. Buffy stakes him again. Dracula attempts to re-form again, but Buffy says, "You think I don't watch your movies? You always come back. I'm standing right here!" He slips away in his mist-form.

Buffy tells Giles that she wants to learn about her duties, the history of slayers, and her future. She asks him to be her Watcher again, which he accepts with pleasure. Buffy comes home and announces to her mom that she is going out with Riley. As she enters her room, she finds a strange girl there going through her stuff. Joyce tells Buffy that she should take her sister with her if she goes out, much to both girls' chagrin.

== Production ==
The vampire who was going to show Buffy a darker side of herself was originally envisioned as "just another vampire who rode a horse and was all cool," says writer Marti Noxon. "I kept saying, 'Like Dracula'" - until Joss Whedon said, "Why not Dracula? He's public domain."

Rudolf Martin, the actor who played Dracula had also played Vlad III Dracula, "the Impaler" (the real life inspiration for Bram Stoker's book Dracula and thus, the vampire Dracula) in the TV movie Dark Prince: The True Story of Dracula which aired on the USA Network a month after this episode aired. Near the end of the film, the story strays into fiction by having Vlad excommunicated by the Orthodox Church (this did not happen in real life) before getting assassinated by his brother Radu (how Vlad actually died is unknown). Due to Vlad's violent life as shown in the film and the excommunication, he is denied entry to both Heaven and Hell and rises from the grave as a vampire and is implied to be one and the same as Count Dracula. The movie therefore has an unintended sense of continuity with the episode as both cast the same actor to play the same character.

Noxon says the scene in which Dracula implies that Buffy would "make an amazing vampire" thematically resonates with the questions of identity with which Buffy struggles throughout Season 5.

When questioning Dracula's identity, Buffy mentions having encountered "pimply and overweight" vampires who named themselves after Anne Rice's vampire character Lestat de Lioncourt. This is the first indication that some vampires appreciate Rice's perspective on vampirism; in contrast, "School Hard" and "Darla" depicted some vampires as having contempt for Rice's concepts.

== Themes ==
Myles McNutt notes the episode's emphases on, first, Buffy and secondly on Dracula. "The last two premieres have featured Buffy facing questions about her identity (in 'Anne' and 'The Freshman'), and her altercation with Dracula is built around similar questions; however, whereas it seemed as if Buffy was struggling to stay afloat amidst the world changing around her at the start of the third and fourth seasons, here she seems to be struggling within, gaining new perspectives on her power and its control over her actions and desires." Secondly, "Dracula himself wasn't funny in the least: while the show was having fun with Dracula's position within popular culture, Dracula wasn't laughing, and in some ways he wasn't even relevant to those stories..." It is "a really evocative use of the image of Dracula as King among his kind to offer a reflection on the Slayer and her position within humanity... I like the detail Spike raises, in that Dracula has in some ways been worse to vampires than he has to the humans he hunts and kills: his celebrity, his elevation above everyone else, made all other vampires more vulnerable, shifting the balance of their kind."

== Reception ==
=== Broadcast and release ===
"Buffy vs. Dracula" was first broadcast on September 26, 2000 on The WB Television Network. During its original broadcast, the episode was watched by 5.8 million viewers and received a Nielsen rating share of 3.9/6. This means that 3.9 percent of all households with a television viewed the episode, while among those households watching TV during this time period, six percent of them were actively watching the program. This was lower than the season three premiere, but higher than the season one and two premieres.

It was released on DVD as part of the fifth season on December 9, 2003.

=== Critical response ===
Vox, ranking it at #74 of all 144 episodes on their "Worst to Best" list, writes, "This episode has a bit of a bad reputation for wasting Buffy's one encounter with the most famous vampire of all time. But it's a crackerjack, very funny hour about Buffy meeting the most famous vampire of all time and finding herself and her friends drawn into his web, even as she rolls her eyes at the whole thing. The episode is now perhaps better remembered for its final reveal — Buffy's brand new sister — but it's an enjoyably lighthearted kickoff to an ambitious season of TV."

Myles McNutt argues, "While it isn't a departure for the series to engage with comedy, the way it is deployed in the episode rather lazily fills in the gaps between the dramatic scenes, failing to integrate the two parts of the episode successfully and truly live up to its potential... Ultimately, I think the show was right to treat this subject matter with a light touch, especially considering how many depictions of Dracula there have been: the show has to put its own stamp on the character, and so much of the time is spent on the characters reacting to Dracula as opposed to on Dracula himself."

== See also ==
- Vampire film
