= Blood Feast =

1963 American independent splatter film by Herschell Gordon Lewis

- Theatrical release poster
- Directed by: Herschell Gordon Lewis
- Screenplay by: Allison Louise Downe
- Story by: David F. Friedman; Herschell Gordon Lewis
- Produced by: David F. Friedman
- Starring: Mal Arnold; William Kerwin; Connie Mason; Lyn Bolton; Scott H. Hall
- Cinematography: Herschell Gordon Lewis
- Edited by: Robert Sinise; Frank Romolo
- Music by: Herschell Gordon Lewis
- Distributed by: Box Office Spectaculars
- Release date: July 6, 1963
- Running time: 67 minutes
- Country: United States
- Language: English
- Budget: $24,500
- Box office: $4 million

Blood Feast is a 1963 American independent splatter film. It was composed, shot, and directed by Herschell Gordon Lewis, written by Allison Louise Downe from an idea by Lewis and David F. Freidman, and stars Mal Arnold, William Kerwin, Connie Mason, and Lyn Bolton. The plot focuses on a psychopathic caterer named Fuad Ramses (Arnold) who kills women so that he can include their body parts in his meals and perform sacrifices to his "Egyptian goddess" Ishtar.

Blood Feast is considered the first splatter film, a sub-genre of horror noted for its graphic depictions of on-screen gore. It was highly successful, grossing $4 million against its minuscule $24,500 budget, while receiving poor reviews from critics, who criticized it as amateurish and crude. The film was followed by a belated sequel, Blood Feast 2: All U Can Eat, in 2002.

== Plot ==
A woman comes home to her Miami Beach apartment and hears of a recent murder in Rogers Park. She is then murdered while taking a bath. Before leaving, the killer hacks off her leg above the knee with a machete and bags it. A copy of a book titled Ancient Weird Religious Rites is seen near the body.

At the police station the following day, Detective Pete Thornton consults with the chief of the homicide bureau about the killings, who says that the killer follows a pattern of mutilating his victims by removing their limbs and organs. Elsewhere in town, Dorothy Fremont hires a caterer named Fuad Ramses to arrange a dinner party for her daughter, Suzette. Ramses – who is the serial murderer – tells Mrs. Fremont he will prepare an ancient Egyptian feast for the affair. Mrs. Fremont is delighted, as Suzette is interested in Egyptology. After Mrs. Fremont leaves Ramses' store, he goes to a back room, where he has enshrined a statue of the goddess Ishtar. Ramses is preparing a "blood feast" – a stew from his victims' blood and body parts intended to resurrect Ishtar.

Later that day, Thornton tells the chief that he interviewed the latest victim's acquaintances and that she was a member of the book club. That evening, Tony and Marcy are on a nearby beach. Ramses arrives, knocks Tony unconscious, and removes Marcy's brain from her skull. Thornton and the chief arrive on the scene but cannot get helpful information from Tony, who is hysterical. They later question Marcy's mother, who tells them Marcy belonged to a book club. Sometime later, Ramses stakes out a motel. He knocks on a woman's door and attacks her when she answers, ripping her tongue out as another ingredient of his "blood feast."

Suzette attends an Egyptian studies lecture with her boyfriend, Detective Thornton, at the local university. The lecturer, Dr. Flanders, tells them about the pharaohs Ramses I and Ramses II and the cult of Ishtar that thrived during their rule 5,000 years ago. He describes a ritual in which women were sacrificed to Ishtar on an altar, and their body parts were prepared and served as dishes during the feast; this was said to cause Ishtar to be reborn. After the lecture, Suzette and Thornton learn that a victim has been found near death and taken to a hospital. Thornton drives Suzette home and rushes to the hospital. The victim, Janet Blake, recounts her attacker saying something that sounded like "Etar" and dies.

Ramses receives a letter from Suzette's friend Trudy Sanders, requesting a copy of Ancient Weird Religious Rites he advertised in the newspaper; he kidnaps Trudy that evening. The next day, Trudy awakens in Ramses's back room. Ramses lashes Trudy with a scourge, collecting her blood in a silver chalice. Suzette informs Thornton that Fuad Ramses will cater her dinner party and serve an authentic Egyptian feast in honor of Ishtar. Noting the similarity between Ishtar and the word "Etar," Thornton calls Dr. Flanders and learns that Ramses is the author of Ancient Weird Religious Rites. Deducing Ramses to be the killer, Thornton and the police race to Ramses' store, where they discover the Ishtar shrine, Trudy's body, and other human remains. The police head to the Fremont house to arrest Ramses and stop the guests from partaking in the feast.

Ramses arrives at the dinner party and asks Suzette to help him make the feast "more authentic." He has Suzette lie on a kitchen countertop and tells her to close her eyes and pray to Ishtar. As he raises his machete to decapitate her, Mrs. Fremont enters the kitchen, and he flees. The police chase Ramses through a dump, and he climbs into the back of a garbage truck. The unaware truck driver turns on the trash compactor, crushing Ramses. Thornton explains to the chief how he deduced the killer's identity and says Ramses must have kept a list of people who requested his book as potential victims. The detectives return to their headquarters to file a report; elsewhere, the statue of Ishtar sheds tears of blood.

== Cast ==
- William Kerwin as Detective Pete Thornton (credited as Thomas Wood)
- Mal Arnold as Fuad Ramses
- Connie Mason as Suzette Fremont
- Lyn Bolton as Mrs. Dorothy Fremont
- Scott H. Hall as Police Chief Frank
- Christy Foushee as Trudy Sanders (credited as Toni Calvert)
- Ashlyn Martin as Marcy Franklin
- Astrid Olson as motel victim
- Sandra Sinclair as Pat Tracey
- Gene Courtier as Tony
- Louise Kamp as Janet Blake / sacrificial victim
- Hal Rich as hospital doctor
- Al Golden as Dr. Flanders

== Production ==
=== Development ===
The concept for Blood Feast arose in the early 1960s, three years after the release of director Alfred Hitchcock’s horror film Psycho. Lewis, previously a teacher at Mississippi State College, had quit his job in order to enter the film business, and directed several "nudie cutie" films in the early 1960s, produced by David F. Friedman (who would later produce Blood Feast and several other splatter films that Lewis would direct). Lewis had seen Psycho and felt that the film had cheated by showing the results of the murders in the film but not the action, because Hitchcock could not risk getting turned down by theaters. The main idea behind Blood Feast was that bathtubs of blood would be spilled in an effort to portray an Egyptian meal cooked with the bodies of virgins and a woman's tongue being ripped out of her mouth.

=== Filming ===
Filming took place in Miami, Florida over a period of four days, with a budget of $24,000 (roughly equivalent to $252,000 today). Director Lewis wanted a realistic prop for the scene where a woman gets her tongue ripped out; in order to accommodate this, a sheep's tongue was imported from Tampa Bay and used in the scene. All other limbs and organs used during production were imported locally. Lewis filmed Blood Feast in color in order to show the red blood used in the film.

== Release ==
Distributed by Box Office Spectaculars, the film was released July 6, 1963 at the Bellevue Drive-In in Bellevue (now Peoria) Illinois. The film was advertised as Egyptian Blood Feast at drive-ins in New York.

Producer Friedman came up with some publicity stunts for the film, such as giving theater-goers "vomit bags" and intentionally taking out an injunction against the film in Sarasota, Florida, in order to gain publicity. Both were very effective and generated more interest in the film, which became highly successful, grossing $4 million against its minuscule $24,500 budget.

=== Censorship ===
In the United Kingdom, the film faced censorship issues, eventually being banned and added to the infamous "video nasty" list. It was given a DVD release in 2001 with 23 seconds of cuts. In 2005, the film was finally released uncut with an 18 certificate after more than 40 years of being banned.

=== Home media ===
Blood Feast was first released on VHS home video by Continental Video in the 1980s. It also received VHS and DVD releases by Something Weird Video in the late 1990s.

In 2017, Arrow Video released the film in a DVD and Blu-ray double pack.

=== Critical reception ===
Blood Feast received generally negative reviews. Variety declared the film to be a "totally inept shocker", "incredibly crude and unprofessional from start to finish" and "an insult even to the most puerile and salacious of audiences". The review labeled the entire production a "fiasco", calling the screenplay (credited to Louise Downe) "senseless", and the acting "amateurish". Of Lewis' direction, camerawork, and musical composition, the review judged that he had "failed dismally on all three counts". The Los Angeles Times described Blood Feast as "a blot on the American film industry." Stephen King has said that it is "the worst horror movie" he has ever seen.

In response to Variety's criticism of the film, Friedman said, "Herschell and I have often wondered who told the Variety scribe we were taking ourselves seriously".

Jerry Renshaw of Austin Chronicle liked the film, but criticized its poor acting and noticeably low budget. Renshaw concluded his review by calling the film "offensive, nasty, shabby, and revolting, but also great fun, if you can stand the sight of guts". On his website Fantastic Movie Musings and Ramblings, Dave Sindelar panned the film, criticizing the acting and stating that director Lewis "manages to make his movies look like home movies without giving them that air of verisimilitude that would make them believable". Dennis Schwartz of Ozus' World Movie Reviews gave Blood Feast a C grade, stating that it was "one of those really bad films that some take pleasure laughing at and others sneering at and others doing both". Allmovie's Fred Beldin wrote, "The plot is threadbare, the acting is on a par with the clumsiest of high school plays and the direction is static and uninvolving. Nevertheless, this is one of the important releases in film history, ushering in a new acceptance of explicit violence that was obviously just waiting to be exploited".

On review aggregator website Rotten Tomatoes, the film holds an approval rating of 33% based on 12 reviews, with a weighted average rating of 4.48/10.

=== Significance ===
Blood Feast immediately became notorious for its explicit gore and violence. It is often cited erroneously as one of the first films to show people dying with their eyes open (earlier examples include D. W. Griffith's 1909 film The Country Doctor, William A. Wellman's 1931 film The Public Enemy and 1960's Psycho).

Fuad Ramses was described by author Christopher Wayne Curry – in his book A Taste of Blood: The Films of Herschell Gordon Lewis – as "the original machete-wielding madman" and the forerunner to similar characters in Friday the 13th and Halloween. Lewis said of the film, "I've often referred to Blood Feast as a Walt Whitman poem. It's no good, but it was the first of its type." "One of the all-time greats," enthused Cramps singer and horror aficionado Lux Interior. "It was the first gore movie… Now, it looks kind of funny, but it's still really sick."

Blood Feast is the first part of what the director's fans call "The Blood Trilogy". Rounding out the trilogy are Two Thousand Maniacs! (1964) and Color Me Blood Red (1965). After the third, producer Friedman said, "I think that for now we're going to abandon making any more 'super blood and gore' movies, since so many of our contemporaries are launching similar productions, causing a risk that the market will quickly reach a saturation point."

== Literature ==
Lewis wrote a novelization of Blood Feast to coincide with the release of the film. The novel, which features significantly different versions of central characters Fuad Ramses, Pete Thornton and Suzette Fremont, has a much more humorous tone than the film and is set in Chicago rather than Miami. It was reprinted by FantaCo Enterprises in the 1980s.

A black-and-white two-issue comic book adaptation of the film was published by Eternity Comics in 1991. It was written by Jack Herman, penciled by Stan Timmons and inked by Mike Matthew.

== Legacy ==
=== Sequels ===
Blood Feast was the first part of Lewis' "Blood Trilogy", with the others being Two Thousand Maniacs! and Color Me Blood Red.

A sequel, Blood Feast 2: All U Can Eat, was released in 2002. It takes place years after the first film, with Fuad's grandson following in his grandfather's footsteps. It marked the first time Lewis and Friedman had worked together on a film in 36 years.

Blood Diner (1987) was produced with the intention of making it a "spiritual sequel" to Blood Feast.

=== Remake ===
A remake directed by Marcel Walz and starring Robert Rusler as Fuad Ramses, was given a limited theatrical release on June 23, 2017.

== See also ==
- List of cult films

== Bibliography ==
- Palmer, Randy (2000). Herschell Gordon Lewis, Godfather of Gore: The Films. Jefferson, North Carolina and London: McFarland & Company. ISBN 0-7864-0808-1.
- Romer, Jean-Claude; Silver, Alain (2000). "A Bloody New Wave in the United States (July 1964)". Horror Film Reader. New York: Limelight Editions. ISBN 0-87910-297-7.
