= Dark Prince: The True Story of Dracula =

- Written by: Thomas Baum
- Directed by: Joe Chappelle
- Starring: Rudolf Martin; Jane March; Christopher Brand; Peter Weller; Michael Sutton; Roger Daltrey
- Theme music composer: Frankie Blue
- Original language: English

Production
- Producer: Avram 'Butch' Kaplan
- Cinematography: Dermott D. Downs
- Editor: Joe Rabig
- Running time: 91 minutes

Original release
- Network: USA Network
- Release: October 31, 2000

Dark Prince: The True Story of Dracula, alternately titled Dracula: The Dark Prince and Dark Prince: The Legend of Dracula, is a 2000 biographical film directed by Joe Chappelle. The film follows the exploits of Vlad the Impaler, the historical figure that the title character from Bram Stoker's 1897 novel Dracula was named after. The film premiered in the United States on the USA Network on October 31, 2000.

== Plot ==
Dark Prince: The True Story of Dracula tells the story of Vlad Dracula, the historical figure who gave Bram Stoker's Dracula his name. Vlad is a dispossessed noble and a patriot who fights the occupation forces of the Turks hoping to avenge the murder of his father by Romanian nobles and the capture of his brother by the Ottoman sultan. The King of Hungary (Roger Daltrey) becomes Vlad's ally and, with his support, Vlad and his men attack the occupying Turks and turncoat Romanian boyars and seizes the throne of Wallachia, in the movie called simply (and anachronistically) "Romania".

His bride, Lidia (Jane March), discovers what Vlad does to the bodies of his enemies and is horrified. She begins to lose her grip on sanity, claiming to hear the voices of the dead. He reluctantly banishes her to a convent, which he later regrets and amends. However, Lidia remains the same and ultimately commits suicide, leaving Vlad dispirited and alone with their adolescent son. Vlad's brother, Radu, arrives at the head of a large Turkish invasion force.

The narrative of the film is presented as evidence given at a hearing following Vlad's alignment with the Roman Catholic King of Hungary. At the end of the film, Vlad is excommunicated by the Orthodox Church shortly before being assassinated by Radu and having a vision of Lidia calling his name. As a result of his condemnation by the priests, Vlad is found to have risen from the grave and gained eternal life, free to roam the earth (as he has been denied entrance to both Heaven and Hell) implying that he has now become the very vampire for which his name is famous.

== Cast ==
Cast of Dark Prince
Character	Actor
Vlad Dracula the Impaler	Rudolf Martin
Lidia	Jane March
Bruno	Christopher Brand
Father Stefan	Peter Weller
King Janos	Roger Daltrey
Radu	Michael Sutton
Orthodox Priest	George V. Grigore

== Reception ==
Critical reaction to Dark Prince: The True Story of Dracula has been mixed. John Walsh of Maxim said, "For such a familiar story, Dark Prince has all the excitement of something brand new. These characters can easily become caricatures, growling for gore and calling down vengeance from heaven. But the excellent cast and ferocious battle scenes make for one of the best war movies to hit TV in a while." Ryan Cracknell of the Apollo Movie Guide wrote, Dracula: The Dark Prince is a welcome extension of the Dracula brand. Unlike the multitudes of generic rip-offs that come out annually, this low-key effort finally puts a new spin on an old myth."

"The combination of above-par acting, interesting storyline, and lovely Eastern European scenery make this USA Network production worth watching." "It's an impressive attempt at rehabilitating the image of Vlad Tepes (Rudolf Martin), the famous Transylvanian prince who inspired Bram Stoker as the model for his vampiric count in the novel {-Dracula}." The New York Times

Mark Bourne of The DVD Journal said, "It plays hell with the facts and reduces its potentially gripping subject to cheesy soap operatic melodrama. ... It's not awful, but it is awfully ordinary. For the real goods, find McNally and Florescu's Dracula: Prince of Many Faces: His Life and Times instead." Christopher Null of Filmcritic.com said, "It's obviously fluffed up but at the same time it's a bit repetitious, with countless battle scenes that don't offer much closure. In the end we're left with the notion that Vlad the Impaler was (and remains) a national hero, not a demon walking among the dead. And that might put a crimp in your enjoyment of the Bram Stoker stories." Melissa J. Perenson of SciFi.com wrote, "Though flawed, Dark Prince nonetheless offers a rough-hewn look at the man who would be known simply as Dracula. But the lack of connection between the so-called reality and the modern-day myth left me wanting."

Rotten Tomatoes gave the film 20% on the 'tomato meter', with an average rating of 4.5/10 from 5 reviews (as of 12/10/2012).

Rudolf Martin (who played Vlad Dracula in Dark Prince) also played Count Dracula in the Buffy the Vampire Slayer episode Buffy vs. Dracula. Owing to the ending of Dark Prince, the film has an unintended sense of continuity with the Buffy episode as both cast the same actor to play the same character.
