= Glen Pitre =

American screenwriter

Glen Anthony Pitre
- Born: November 10, 1955 (age 70); Cut Off, Lafourche Parish; Louisiana, USA
- Occupations: Screenwriter; Film director
- Years active: 1986-present
- Parent(s): Loulan, Sr., and Emelia Chabert Pitre
- Relatives: Loulan Pitre, Jr. (brother)

Glen Anthony Pitre (born November 10, 1955) is an American screenwriter and film director. He has written nine films since 1986. His debut film Belizaire the Cajun was screened in the Un Certain Regard section at the 1986 Cannes Film Festival.

He was born in Cut Off in Lafourche Parish, Louisiana. In his film Belizaire the Cajun, his father, Loulan Pitre, Sr., played a role.

== Filmography ==
- 1986 Belizaire the Cajun
- 1998 Haunted Waters
- 1998 Good for What Ails You
- 1999 Time Served
- 2002 The Scoundrel's Wife
- 2003 Top Speed
- 2006 Hurricane on the Bayou
- 2006 American Creole: New Orleans Reunion
- 2007 Journey Across India
- 2008 The Man Who Came Back
- 2009 Cigarettes & Nylons
