= Time Served (film) =

- Directed by: Glen Pitre
- Written by: Michael Melon; Paul Pompian
- Produced by: John H. Burrows; Ron De Rosa
- Starring: Catherine Oxenberg; Jeff Fahey; Louise Fletcher; James Handy; Bo Hopkins
- Cinematography: Jeff Roberts
- Edited by: Barrett Taylor
- Music by: Joe Delia
- Distributed by: Trimark Pictures
- Release date: 1999
- Running time: 94 minutes
- Country: United States
- Language: English

Time Served is a 1999 R-rated American prison film directed by Glen Pitre and starring Catherine Oxenberg, Jeff Fahey, Louise Fletcher, James Handy, and Bo Hopkins.

Foreign-language versions were produced in German (Ausgebeutet - Hölle hinter Gittern), in Spanish (Condenada sin ley), in Italian (Dietro le sbarre), and in Hungarian (Leszolgált idő).

== Plot ==
Sarah McKinney (Catherine Oxenberg) is a nurse married to an abusive alcoholic. When he beats up both Sarah and their eight-year-old son Jason (Zach Gray), the boy uses his father's gun to shoot him dead. Sarah then claims to have pulled the trigger herself, and her attorney, Patrick Burlington (Jeff Fahey) warns her that she faces Judge William T. Engstrom III (James Handy), known as "Maximum Bill" for his long sentences. Convicted and sent to the Women's State Correctional Facility, she suffers lesbian assaults and Warden Mildred Reinecke (Louise Fletcher) bullies her into joining the work release program. This proves to be a strip club, where Sarah and the prisoners' services are enjoyed by none other than Judge Engstrom and his friends. Sarah sets out to blow the whistle, but being a helpless prisoner in the system has her at a disadvantage.

== Cast ==
- Catherine Oxenberg as Sarah McKinney
- Jeff Fahey as Patrick Berlington
- Louise Fletcher as Warden Mildred Reinecke
- Bo Hopkins as Mr. D.
- James Handy as Judge William T. "Maximum Bill" Engstrom III
- Larry Manetti as Billy
- Lourdes Reynolds (Lourdes Colon) as Rosie Lopez
- Scott Schumacher as Duane
- Zach Gray as Jason McKinney
- Maureen Steindler as Lila
- Regina Prokop as Brenda
- Tyla Abercrumbie as Brenda's Cellmate
- Michael Landers as Bob
- Jack Bennett as Billy's Friend
- Jim Zulevic as Computer Hacker
- Shirl Toliver as Prison Nurse
- Greg Hollimon as FBI Agent
- Veronica Armstrong as Dancer
- Holly Biniak as Dancer
- Eileen Flahtely as Dancer
- Michele Jeans as Dancer
- Debora Joseph as Dancer
- Jennifer Malanado as Dancer
- Savy Run as Dancer
- Carrie White as Dancer
- Dawn Zilnsky as Dancer

== Production ==
The picture was filmed in the summer of 1998 in Chicago, Berwyn, and Melrose Park, all in Illinois.

It was R-rated for adult situations, language, nudity, and violence. VideoHound called it a "typically sleazy women-in-prison movie".
