= Mennan Yapo =

German director, screenwriter, producer, and actor

- Born: 1966 (age 59–60); Munich, Germany
- Occupations: Director, screenwriter, producer, actor.
- Years active: 1996 - present
- Awards: Cognac Festival du Film Policier; Special Jury Prize; 2004 Lautlos

Mennan Yapo (born 1966) is a German director, screenwriter, producer and actor.

Born in Munich to Turkish parents, Yapo has been in the film business since 1988, working in various assistant jobs and as a publicist at first.

From 1995, Yapo worked as a screenwriter and producer, as well as a supporting actor (in Peter Greenaway's The Pillow Book, 1996, and Wolfgang Becker's Good Bye Lenin!, 2003).

1999 marked Yapo's first outing as a director. His directing debut, the short subject Framed, was nominated for the Deutscher Filmpreis and shown at numerous international festivals.

In 2002, Yapo started working on his first full-length directing work, the thriller Soundless which became a German box-office success in 2004. It also won international critical acclaim.

Yapo's Hollywood directing debut, the drama film Premonition, starring Sandra Bullock, was released to cinemas in March 2007 and grossed $85 million worldwide.

== Filmography ==
Director

- 1999: Framed (short film)
- 2004: Soundless
- 2007: Premonition

Producer

- 1996: After Hours
- 1999: Framed
- 2001: Birth:day
- 2013: Planet USA

Actor

- 1996: The Pillow Book, as "Café Typo" Manager
- 2003: Good Bye, Lenin!, as Flea Market Vendor
