= List of films: S =

indexed lists of films
| 0–9 | A | B | C | D | E | F |
| G | H | I | J–K | L | M | N–O |
| P | Q–R | S | T | U–V–W | X–Y–Z | |

This is an alphabetical list of film articles (or sections within articles about films). It includes made for television films. See the talk page for the method of indexing used.

== S ==
- S Diary (2004)
- S. Darko (2009)
- S.M.A.R.T. Chase (2017)
- S.S. Doomtrooper (2006) (TV)
- S.W.A.T. (2003)
- S.W.A.T.: Firefight (2011)

=== Sa ===
- Sa (2016)
- Sa Aking mga Kamay (1996)
- Sa Bangji (1988)
- Sa Bilis Walang Kaparis (1964)
- Sa Dulo ng Baril (1988)
- Sa Kabila ng Lahat (1991)
- Sa Kamay ng Diyos (2023)
- Sa Kuko ng Agila (1989)
- Sa La Te Sa La Na Te (2023)
- Sa Likod ng Tsapa (2025)
- Sa Ngalan ng Ama, Ina at mga Anak (2014)
- Sa Paraiso ni Efren (1999)
- Sa Pusod ng Dagat (1998)

==== Saa–Sal ====
- Saa Boo Thiri (2009)
- Saadia (1953)
- Saagar (1985)
- Saajan (1991)
- Saajan Bina Suhagan (1978)
- Saak (2019)
- Saamy (2003)
- Saathiya (2002)
- Saawariya (2007)
- Sabata (1969)
- Sabotage (1936)
- Sabotage (1939)
- Sabotage (2014)
- Saboteur (1942)
- Sabretooth (2002)
- Sabrina: (1954 & 1995)
- Sabrina the Teenage Witch series:
  - Sabrina the Teenage Witch (1996 TV)
  - Sabrina Goes to Rome (1998 TV)
  - Sabrina, Down Under (1999 TV)
  - Sabrina: Friends Forever (2002 TV)
- Saccharine (2026)
- Sacco & Vanzetti (1971)
- Sacco and Vanzetti (2006)
- The Sacrament (2013)
- Sacramento (2024)
- Sacred Ground (1983)
- The Sacred Spirit (2021)
- Sacrifice: (1917, 2000, 2010, 2011, 2016, 2020 & 2025)
- The Sacrifice: (1909, 1918, 1979, 1986, 2005 & 2020)
- Sad Hill Unearthed (2017)
- The Sad Sack (1957)
- The Saddest Music in the World (2003)
- Sade (2000)
- Sadie McKee (1934)
- Sadie Thompson (1928)
- Sadko (1953)
- The Sadness (2021)
- Sadomania (1981)
- Safe: (1995 & 2012)
- Safe Haven (2013)
- Safe House: (1998 TV, 2012 & 2025)
- Safe Men (1998)
- A Safe Place (1971)
- Safety (2020)
- Safety Last! (1923)
- Safety Not Guaranteed (2012)
- The Safety of Objects (2001)
- The Saga of Gosta Berling (1924)
- The Saga of the Viking Women and Their Voyage to the Waters of the Great Sea Serpent (1958)
- Sagar (2012)
- Sahara: (1919, 1943 American, 1943 Indian, 1958, 1983, 1995 TV, 2005 & 2017)
- Sailor Beware (1952)
- Sailor Beware! (1956)
- Sailor Moon series:
  - Sailor Moon R: The Movie (1993)
  - Sailor Moon S: The Movie (1994)
  - Sailor Moon Super S: The Movie (1995)
- Sailor Suit and Machine Gun (1981)
- Sailor Suit and Machine Gun: Graduation (2016)
- The Sailor Who Fell from Grace with the Sea (1976)
- Sailors, Beware! (1927)
- Saimin (1999)
- The Saint RKO series:
  - The Saint in London (1939)
  - The Saint in New York (1938)
  - The Saint in Palm Springs (1941)
  - The Saint Meets the Tiger (1943)
  - The Saint Strikes Back (1939)
  - The Saint Takes Over (1940)
  - The Saint's Double Trouble (1940)
  - The Saint's Return (1953)
  - The Saint's Vacation (1941)
- The Saint: (1941, 1997 & 2017)
- Saint Ange (2004)
- Saint Clare (2024)
- Saint Frances (2019)
- Saint Joan: (1957 & 1967 TV)
- Saint John of Las Vegas (2009)
- Saint Maud (2019)
- Saint Ralph (2005)
- Saint-Ex (1997)
- Saint-Narcisse (2020)
- A Saintly Switch (1999)
- Saints and Soldiers (2004)
- Saippuaprinssi (2006)
- Saki (2017)
- Salaam Bombay! (1988)
- Salaam Namaste (2005)
- Salakhain (2004)
- Salangeul chajaseo (1929)
- Salem's Lot (1979) (TV)
- Salesman (1969)
- The Salesman: (2011 & 2016)
- Sally: (1925, 1929 & 2000)
- Salmon Fishing in the Yemen (2011)
- Salò, or the 120 Days of Sodom (1975)
- Salome of the Tenements (1925)
- Salome's Last Dance (1988)
- Salomé: (1918, 1923 & 1953)
- Salon Kitty (1976)
- Saloum (2021)
- Salt: (1987, 2006, 2009 & 2010)
- The Salt of the Earth (2014)
- Salt of the Earth (1954)
- Salt and Pepper (1968)
- Saltburn (2023)
- The Salton Sea: (2002 & 2016)
- Saludos Amigos (1943)
- Salvador: (1986 & 2006)
- Salvador Dalí (1971)
- The Salvation (2014)
- Salvatore Giuliano (1962)
- Salvatore: Shoemaker of Dreams (2020)
- Salween (1994)

==== Sam ====
- Sam: (1967, 1986 & 2021)
- Sam Bahadur (2023)
- Sam Jackson's Secret Video Diary (2007)
- Sam & Kate (2022)
- Sam & Me (1991)
- Sam Now (2022)
- Sam Pek Eng Tay (1931)
- Sam Steele and the Junior Detective Agency (2009)
- Sam's Game (2006)
- Sam's Son (1984)
- Sam's Song (1969)
- Samaantar (2009)
- Samaantharangal (1998)
- Samaara (2006)
- Samaritan (2022)
- The Samaritan (2012)
- Samaritan Girl (2004)
- Same Kind of Different as Me (2017)
- Same Old Song (1997)
- Same Time, Next Year (1979)
- Sami Blood (2016)
- Le Samouraï (1967)
- Sampo (1959)
- SamSam (2019)
- Samsara: (2001 & 2011)
- Samson: (1914, 1915, 1923, 1936, 1961 Polish, 1961 Italian & 2018)
- Samson and Delilah: (1922, 1949, 1984, 1996 TV & 2009)
- Samson and His Mighty Challenge (1964)
- Samson and the Sea Beast (1963)
- Samson and the Seven Miracles of the World (1961)
- Samson and the Slave Queen (1963)
- Samurai Assassin (1965)
- Samurai Cop (1991)
- Samurai Cop 2: Deadly Vengeance (2015)
- Samurai Fiction (1998)
- Samurai Hustle (2014)
- Samurai Hustle Returns (2016)
- Samurai Rebellion (1967)
- Samurai Reincarnation (1981)
- Samurai Spy (1965)
- Samurai Trilogy series:
  - Samurai I: Musashi Miyamoto (1954)
  - Samurai II: Duel at Ichijoji Temple (1955)
  - Samurai III: Duel at Ganryu Island (1956)

==== San ====
- San Andreas (2015)
- San Antone (1953)
- San Antonio (1945)
- San Antonio Rose (1941)
- San Babila-8 P.M. (1976)
- San Diego, I Love You (1944)
- San Diego Surf (1968)
- San Domingo (1970)
- San Francisco: (1936 & 1968)
- San Lazaro (2011)
- San Quentin: (1937 & 1946)
- San Salvatore (1956)
- San-Antonio (2004)
- Sana Dalawa ang Puso Ko (1994)
- Sana Dati (2013)
- Sana Maulit Muli (1995)
- Sanaadi Appanna (1977)
- Sanada 10 Braves (2016)
- Sanagi Tangbal (2014)
- Sanakeithel (1983)
- Sanam: (1951 & 1997)
- Sanam Re (2016)
- Sanam Teri Kasam: (1982, 2009 & 2016)
- Sanatorium (2025)
- Sanatorium Under the Sign of the Hourglass (2024)
- Sanctimony (2000)
- Sanctioning Evil (2022)
- Sanctuary: (1933, 1961, 2001, 2006, 2009, 2015 & 2022)
- Sanctum (2011)
- Sand: 1949 & 2000)
- Sand! (1920)
- Sand Castle (2017)
- Sand Castles (2014)
- Sand City (2025)
- Sand Dollars (2014)
- Sand, Love and Salt (1957)
- The Sand Pebbles (1966)
- Sand Storm (2016)
- Sand Wars (2013)
- Sandade Sandadi (2002)
- Sandakan No. 8 (1974)
- Sandakot Na Bala (1988)
- Sandakozhi (2005)
- Sandakozhi 2 (2018)
- Sandalu Thalen Eha (2008)
- Sandamarutham (2015)
- Sandcastle (2010)
- Sanders of the River (1935)
- Sandesam (1991)
- Sandesaya (1960)
- Sandhana Kaatru (1990)
- Sandharbha (1978)
- Sandhippoma (1998)
- Sandhippu (1983)
- Sandhitha Velai (2000)
- Sandhithathum Sindhithathum (2013)
- Sandhuravirey (2002)
- Sandhuravirey 2 (2004)
- Sandhya (1969)
- Sandhya Mayangum Neram (1984)
- Sandhya Raagam (1989)
- Sandhya Raga (1966)
- Sandhya Vandanam (1983)
- Sandhyakku Virinja Poovu (1983)
- Sandhyaraag (1977)
- The Sandlot (1993)
- The Sandlot 2 (2005)
- The Sandlot: Heading Home (2007)
- The Sandman: (1991, 2000, 2011 & 2017 TV)
- Sandor slash Ida (2005)
- The Sandpiper (1965)
- Sands of Iwo Jima (1949)
- Sands of the Kalahari (1965)
- The Sands of Kurobe (1968)
- Sangam: (1964 Hindi, 1964 Urdu & 1997)
- Sango-sho Densetsu: Aoi Umi no Erufii (1986)
- Sanitation Day (2021)
- Sanjuro (1962)
- Sankaku (2010)
- Sannaham (1985)
- Sano Sansar (2008)
- Sanrakshan (2017)
- Sanremo (2020)
- Sans laisser de traces (2010)
- Sans plomb (2000)
- Sans Soleil (1983)
- Sansa (2003)
- Sansani: The Sensation (1981)
- Sansar: (1971 & 1987)
- Sanshay Kallol (2013)
- Sanshiro Sugata (1943)
- Sanshiro Sugata Part II (1945)
- Sansho the Bailiff (1954)
- Sansun Nosansun (2003)
- Sant Dnyaneshwar (1940)
- Sant Dnyaneshwaranchi Muktai (2025)
- Sant Gyaneshwar (1964)
- Sant Sakhu (1941)
- Sant Tukaram (1936)
- Sant Tukaram (2025)
- Santa Claus: (1898 & 1959)
- Santa Claus Is Comin' to Town (1970)
- Santa Claus Conquers the Martians (1964)
- Santa Claus and the Magic Drum (1996) (TV)
- Santa Claus vs. Cupid (1915)
- Santa Claus: The Movie (1985)
- The Santa Clause series:
  - The Santa Clause (1994)
  - The Santa Clause 2 (2002)
  - The Santa Clause 3: The Escape Clause (2006)
- Santa Fe Trail (1940)
- Santa Fe Uprising (1946)
- Santa and the Ice Cream Bunny (1972)
- Santa with Muscles (1996)
- Santa Sangre (1989)
- Santa vs. the Snowman 3D (2002)
- Santa Who? (2000)
- Santa's Little Helper (2015)
- Santa's Slay (2005)
- Santa's Workshop (1932)
- Santo series:
  - Santo contra el cerebro del mal (1961)
  - Santo contra los zombis (1961)
  - Santo vs. las Mujeres Vampiro (1962)
  - Santo contra el cerebro diabolico (1963)
  - Santo en el tesoro de Drácula (1968)
- Sanyasi (1945)
- Sanyasi (1975)
- Sanyasi Mera Naam (1999)
- Sanyasi Raja (1975)
- Sanyasi-Samsari (1942)
- Sanz y el secreto de su arte (1918)

==== Sap–Sas ====
- The Sap: (1926 & 1929)
- Sapphire (1959)
- The Sapphires (2012)
- Saps at Sea (1940)
- Sara: (1992, 1997, 2010 & 2015)
- Saraband (2003 TV)
- The Saragossa Manuscript (1965)
- Sarah (1982)
- Sarah Silverman: Jesus Is Magic (2005)
- Sarah and Son (1930)
- Sarah's Choice (2009)
- Sarah's Key (2011)
- Sarajevo: (1940 French, 1940 Hungarian, 1955 & 2014 TV)
- Saratoga Trunk (1945)
- Sardaar Ji (2015)
- Sarfarosh (1998)
- Sarkar series:
  - Sarkar: (2005 & 2014)
  - Sarkar 3 (2017)
  - Sarkar Raj (2008)
- Sarraounia (1986)
- SARS Wars (2004)
- Sartana's Here… Trade Your Pistol for a Coffin (1970)
- Sasaki and Miyano: Graduation (2023)
- Sasanam (2006)
- Sashi (2021)
- Sasidharan (1950)
- Sasirekha Parinayam (2009)
- Sasneham (1990)
- Sasneham Sumithra (2004)
- The Sasquatch Gang (2006)
- Sasquatch, the Legend of Bigfoot (1976)
- Sasquatch: Legend Meets Science (2003 TV)
- Sasquatch Sunset (2024)
- Sassi (1954)
- Sassy Pants (2012)
- Sassy Sue (1973)
- Sasthram Jayichu Manushyan Thottu (1973)
- Sasu Cha Swayamwar (2015)
- Sasura Bada Paisawala (2003)
- Sasura Ghara Zindabad (2010)
- Sasural: (1941, 1961 & 1984)
- Sasurbari Zindabad (2000)

==== Sat–Sau ====
- The Satan Bug (1965)
- Satan Met a Lady (1936)
- Satan Never Sleeps (1962)
- Satan's Cheerleaders (1977)
- Satan's Little Helper (2004)
- Satan's School for Girls (2000)
- Satan's Slave: (1976 & 1980)
- Satan's Slaves (2017)
- Satan's Sword (1960)
- Satanic (2016)
- The Satanic Rites of Dracula (1973)
- Satánico pandemonium (1975)
- Sátántangó (1994)
- Sathya: (1988, 2010, 2017 Malayalam & 2017 Tamil)
- Sathyam: (1980 & 2004)
- Satomi Hakkenden (1983)
- Sator (2019)
- Saturday (1945)
- Saturday the 14th (1981)
- Saturday the 14th Strikes Back (1988)
- Saturday Fiction (2019)
- Saturday Morning Mystery (2012)
- Saturday Night: (1922, 1950, 2010 & 2024)
- Saturday Night Fever (1977)
- Saturday Night and Sunday Morning (1960)
- Saturn 3 (1980)
- Satyam: (1976, 2003 & 2008)
- Satyricon: (1969 Fellini & 1969 Polidoro)
- Sauerbruch – Das war mein Leben (1954)
- Sausage Party (2016)
- Le Saut à la couverture (1895)

==== Sav–Saz ====
- Savage: (1973 TV & 2009)
- The Savage: (1917, 1926 & 1952)
- Savage! (1973)
- Savage Beach (1989)
- A Savage Christmas (2023)
- Savage Grace (2007)
- Savage Harvest (1981)
- The Savage Innocents (1959)
- Savage Messiah: (1972 & 2002)
- Savage Planet (2006) (TV)
- Savage Salvation (2022)
- Savage Sisters (1974)
- Savage Streets (1984)
- Savage Weekend (1976)
- The Savages (2008)
- Savages: (1972, 1974 TV & 2012)
- Save the Date (2012)
- Save the Green Planet! (2003)
- Save the Last Dance (2001)
- Save Ralph (2021)
- Save the Tiger (1973)
- Saved! (2004)
- The Saved (1998)
- Saved from the Titanic (1912)
- Saving Bikini Bottom: The Sandy Cheeks Movie (2024)
- Saving Face: (2004 & 2012)
- Saving General Yang (2013)
- Saving Grace: (1986, 1998 & 2000)
- Saving Grace B. Jones (2009)
- Saving Mr. Banks (2013)
- Saving My Hubby (2002)
- Saving Private Ryan (1998)
- Saving Silverman (2001)
- Saving Star Wars (2004)
- Saving Zoë (2019)
- Savior (1998)
- The Savior: (1971 & 2014)
- Saw series:
  - Saw: (2003 & 2004)
  - Saw II (2005)
  - Saw III (2006)
  - Saw IV (2007)
  - Saw V (2008)
  - Saw VI (2009)
  - Saw 3D (2010)
  - Jigsaw (2017)
  - Spiral (2021)
  - Saw X (2023)
- Sawaal (1982)
- Sawaal Majha Aika! (1964)
- Sawaari (2016)
- Sawako Decides (2009)
- Sawan Aya Re (1949)
- Sawan Bhadon (1970)
- Sawan Ki Ghata (1966)
- Sawan Ko Aane Do (1979)
- Sawbones (1995 TV)
- Sawdust (1923)
- The Sawdust Paradise (1928)
- The Sawdust Ring (1917)
- Sawdust and Tinsel (1953)
- The Sawdust Trail (1924)
- The Sawmill (1922)
- A Sawmill Hazard (1913)
- A Sawmill Hero (1911)
- Sawo Matang (2023)
- Saworoide (1999)
- Sawtooth (2004)
- Saxon (2007)
- Say Amen, Somebody (1982)
- Say Anything... (1989)
- Say God Bye (2023)
- Say Goodbye (1971)
- Say Hello to Yesterday (1971)
- Say Hi to Pencil! (2011)
- Say I Do: (2003 & 2004)
- Say It Again (1926)
- Say It with Babies (1926)
- Say It with Diamonds: (1927 & 1935)
- Say It with Flowers: (1934 & 1952)
- Say It in French (1938)
- Say It Isn't So (2001)
- Say It with Music: (1929 & 1932)
- Say It in Russian (2007)
- Say It with Sables (1928)
- Say It with Songs (1929)
- Say Lo Yar Say (1971)
- Say My Name (2018)
- Say Nothing (2001)
- Say One for Me (1959)
- Say Uncle (2006)
- Say Yes (2001)
- Say Yes to Love (2012)
- Say You Want Me (1977)
- Say! Young Fellow (1918)
- Say Your Prayers (2020)
- Saya e Khuda e Zuljalal (2016)
- Sayam Sandhya (1986)
- Sayed Darwish (1966)
- Sayed the Romantic (2005)
- Sayew (2003)
- Sayon's Bell (1943)
- Sayonara (1957)
- Sayonara (2015)
- Sayonara to Hello (2012)
- Sayonara Midori-chan (2005)
- Sayoojyam (1979)
- Sazaa: (1951, 1972 & 2011)

=== Sb ===
- Sbamm! (1980)

=== Sc ===
==== Sca ====
- Scaffolding (2017)
- Scalawag (1973)
- Scales (2019)
- Scalp Trouble (1939)
- Scalpel (1977)
- Scalpel, Please (1985)
- The Scalphunters (1968)
- Scalps (1983)
- Scam (1993 TV)
- The Scam (2009)
- Scampolo: (1928, 1932, 1941 & 1958)
- Scandal: (1917, 1929, 1950, 1989 & 2012)
- The Scandal: (1923, 1934 & 1943)
- Scandal in Bad Ischl (1957)
- Scandal in Baden-Baden (1929)
- Scandal in Budapest (1933)
- Scandal at the Embassy (1950)
- Scandal in the Family: (1967 & 1975)
- Scandal at the Fledermaus (1936)
- Scandal at the Girls' School (1953)
- Scandal Incorporated (1956)
- Scandal Maker (2016)
- Scandal Makers (2008)
- A Scandal in Paris (1946)
- Scandal on Park Street (1932)
- Scandal Proof (1925)
- Scandal for Sale (1932)
- Scandal at Scourie (1953)
- Scandal Sheet: (1931, 1939, 1952 & 1985 TV)
- Scandal in a Small Town (1988 TV)
- Scandal in Sorrento (1955)
- Scandal Street: (1925 & 1938)
- Scandale (1982)
- Scandalo in famiglia (1976)
- Scandalous (1984)
- The Scandalous Adventures of Buraikan (1970)
- Scandalous Eva (1930)
- Scandalous Gilda (1985)
- Scandalous John (1971)
- Scanner Cop (1994)
- A Scanner Darkly (2006)
- Scanners (1981)
- Scanners II: The New Order (1991)
- Scanners III: The Takeover (1992)
- Scanners: The Showdown (1995)
- The Scapegoat: (1912, 1959, 2011, 2012 & 2013)
- Scar (2007)
- The Scar: (1919 & 1976)
- The Scar of Shame (1929)
- Scaramouche (1952)
- Scare Me (2020)
- Scarecrow: (1973, 1984, 2002, 2013 TV & 2020)
- The Scarecrow: (1920, 1982, 2000 & 2013)
- Scarecrow Gone Wild (2004)
- The Scarecrow of Romney Marsh (1963)
- Scarecrows (1988)
- Scared to Death (1947)
- Scared Stiff: (1945, 1953 & 1987)
- Scared Straight! (1978)
- Scaredy Cat (1948)
- The Scarehouse (2014)
- Scarface: (1932 & 1983)
- The Scarlet and the Black (1983) (TV)
- The Scarlet Claw (1944)
- Scarlet Diva (2000)
- The Scarlet Empress (1934)
- The Scarlet Letter: (1908, 1911, 1913, 1922, 1926, 1934, 1973, 1995 & 2004)
- The Scarlet Pimpernel: (1934 & 1982)
- The Scarlet Pumpernickel (1950)
- Scarlet Road (2011)
- The Scarlet Runner (1916)
- Scarlet Sails (Алые Паруса) (1961)
- Scarlet Street (1945)
- Scars of Dracula (1970)
- Scars Of My Days (2006)
- Scary Godmother: Halloween Spooktakular (2003)
- Scary Godmother: The Revenge of Jimmy (2005)
- Scary Movie series:
  - Scary Movie: (2000 & 2026)
  - Scary Movie 2 (2001)
  - Scary Movie 3 (2003)
  - Scary Movie 4 (2006)
  - Scary Movie 5 (2013)
- Scary Road Is Fun (2015)
- The Scary of Sixty-First (2021)
- Scary Stories to Tell in the Dark (2019)
- Scavenger Hunt (1979)

==== Sce ====
- The Scene of the Crash (1971)
- Scene of the Crime: (1949, 1986 & 1996)
- Scene No. 7 (1985)
- Scene Onnu Nammude Veedu (2012)
- A Scene at the Sea (1991)
- Scenes of City Life (1935)
- Scenes from the Class Struggle in Beverly Hills (1989)
- Scenes of the Crime (2001)
- Scenes from a Gay Marriage (2012)
- Scenes from the Goldmine (1987)
- Scenes from a Mall (1991)
- Scenes from a Marriage (1973) (TV)
- Scenes of a Sexual Nature (2006)
- Scenes from Under Childhood (1967–70)
- The Scenesters (2009)
- Scenic Route (2013)
- The Scenic Route (1978)
- The Scent (2012)
- The Scent of Blood (2004)
- The Scent of Burning Grass (2012)
- The Scent of Green Papaya (1994)
- The Scent of Incense (1964)
- Scent of Love (2003)
- A Scent of the Matterhorn (1961)
- Scent of Mystery (1960)
- The Scent of the Night (1998)
- The Scent of Rain and Lightning (2017)
- Scent of a Woman: (1974 & 1992)
- Scent-imental Over You (1947)
- Scent-imental Romeo (1951)
- The Sceptre and the Mace (1957)

==== Sch ====
- Schalcken the Painter (1979 TV)
- Schapelle (2014 TV)
- Schatten – Eine nächtliche Halluzination (1923)
- Schaut auf diese Stadt (1962)
- Scheherazade, Tell Me a Story (2009)
- Scheherazade's Diary (2013)
- Scheme Birds (2019)
- Schemers (2019)
- The Schemers (1916)
- Scheming Schemers (1956)
- Schiava del peccato (1954)
- Schichlegruber Doing the Lambeth Walk (1942)
- Schiele in Prison (1980)
- Schindler's List (1993)
- Schizo (1976)
- Schozoid (1980)
- Schizophrenia (1997)
- Schizopolis (1996)
- Schlager (1979)
- Schlock (1973)
- Schmutz (1985)
- Schnitzel (2014)
- Schnitzel Paradise (2005)
- School (2025)
- School Begins (1928)
- School Bus (2016)
- School of Champions (1950)
- School for Coquettes: (1935 & 1958)
- School Dance (2014)
- School for Danger (1947)
- School Days: (1920, 1921 & 1995)
- School Days with a Pig (2008)
- School Daze (1988)
- School Diary (2018)
- School on Fire (1988)
- The School of Flesh (1998)
- School Ghost Stories (1995)
- School Ghost Stories 3 (1997)
- School for Girls (1935)
- School of the Holy Beast (1974)
- School for Husbands (1937)
- School Is Over (2010)
- School Life: (2016 & 2019)
- School of Life: (2003 & 2005)
- School for Love (1955)
- School in the Mailbox (1947)
- School for Marriage (1954)
- School Master: (1958, 1959, 1964, 1973 & 2010)
- School for Models (1949)
- School for Postmen (1947)
- School for Randle (1949)
- School of Rock (2003)
- School for Scoundrels: (1960 & 2006)
- School for Secrets (1946)
- School for Seduction (2004)
- School for Sex (1969)
- School Spirit (1985)
- School for Stars (1935)
- School for Suicide (1964)
- School Ties (1992)
- School for Tramps (1955)
- School Trip (2002)
- School Waltz (1978)
- School for Wives (1925)
- School-Live! (2019)
- School's Out: (1930, 1992 & 2018)
- Schooled: The Price of College Sports (2013)
- Schoolgirl Apocalypse (2011)
- Schoolgirl Diary (1941)
- Schoolgirls (2020)
- Schramm (1993)
- Schtonk! (1992)
- Schuks! Your Country Needs You (2013)
- Schuks Tshabalala's Survival Guide to South Africa (2010)
- Schulmädchen-Report (1970)
- Schultze Gets the Blues (2003)
- Schwarz und weiß wie Tage und Nächte (1978)
- Schweik in Civilian Life (1927)
- Schweik's New Adventures (1943)
- Schweitzer (1990)

==== Sci–Scy ====
- Sci-Fighters (1996)
- Science Fair (2018)
- Science Fiction (2003)
- The Science of Fictions (2019)
- Science Moms (2017)
- Science Ninja Team Gatchaman: The Movie (1978)
- The Science of Sleep (2006)
- The Scientific Cardplayer (1973)
- Scientists Under Attack: Genetic Engineering in the Magnetic Field of Money (2009)
- The Scimitar of the Prophet (1913)
- Scirocco (1987)
- Scissors (1991)
- Scobie Malone (1975)
- The Scoffer (1920)
- Scooby-Doo series:
  - Scooby Goes Hollywood (1979)
  - Scooby-Doo Meets the Boo Brothers (1987)
  - Scooby-Doo and the Reluctant Werewolf (1988)
  - Scooby-Doo and the Ghoul School (1988)
  - Scooby-Doo in Arabian Nights (1994)
  - Scooby-Doo on Zombie Island (1998)
  - Scooby-Doo! and the Witch's Ghost (1999)
  - Scooby-Doo and the Alien Invaders (2000)
  - Scooby-Doo and the Cyber Chase (2001)
  - Scooby-Doo (2002)
  - Scooby-Doo! and the Legend of the Vampire (2003)
  - Scooby-Doo! and the Monster of Mexico (2003)
  - Scooby-Doo 2: Monsters Unleashed (2004)
  - Scooby-Doo! and the Loch Ness Monster (2004)
  - Aloha, Scooby-Doo! (2005)
  - Scooby-Doo! in Where's My Mummy? (2005)
  - Scooby-Doo! Pirates Ahoy! (2006)
  - Chill Out, Scooby-Doo! (2007)
  - Scooby-Doo! and the Goblin King (2008)
  - Scooby-Doo! and the Samurai Sword (2009)
  - Scooby-Doo! The Mystery Begins (2009)
  - Scooby-Doo! Abracadabra-Doo (2010)
  - Scooby-Doo! Camp Scare (2010)
  - Scooby-Doo! Curse of the Lake Monster (2010)
  - Scooby-Doo! Legend of the Phantosaur (2011)
  - Scooby-Doo! Music of the Vampire (2012)
  - Big Top Scooby-Doo! (2012)
  - Scooby-Doo! Mask of the Blue Falcon (2013)
  - Scooby-Doo! Adventures: The Mystery Map (2013)
  - Scooby-Doo! Stage Fright (2013)
  - Scooby-Doo! WrestleMania Mystery (2014)
  - Scooby-Doo! Frankencreepy (2014)
  - Scooby-Doo! Moon Monster Madness (2015)
  - Scooby-Doo! and Kiss: Rock and Roll Mystery (2015)
  - Lego Scooby-Doo! Haunted Hollywood (2016)
  - Scooby-Doo! and WWE: Curse of the Speed Demon (2016)
  - Scooby-Doo! Shaggy's Showdown (2017)
  - Lego Scooby-Doo! Blowout Beach Bash (2017)
  - Scooby-Doo! & Batman: The Brave and the Bold (2018)
  - Daphne & Velma (2018)
  - Scooby-Doo! and the Gourmet Ghost (2018)
  - Scooby-Doo! and the Curse of the 13th Ghost (2019)
  - Scooby-Doo! Return to Zombie Island (2019)
  - Scoob! (2020)
  - Happy Halloween, Scooby-Doo! (2020)
  - Scooby-Doo! The Sword and the Scoob (2021)
  - Straight Outta Nowhere: Scooby-Doo! Meets Courage the Cowardly Dog (2021)
  - Trick or Treat Scooby-Doo! (2022)
  - Scooby-Doo! and Krypto, Too! (2023)
- Scoop (1987) (TV)
- Scoop (2006)
- Scoop (2024)
- Scoop! (2016)
- The Scoop (1934)
- Scooterman (2010)
- Scorched (2003)
- Scorched (2008) (TV)
- Scorched Earth (1969)
- Scorched Earth (2018)
- Scorched Earth (2024)
- Scorcher (2002)
- Scorchers (1991)
- Scorching Fury (1952)
- Scorching Sands (1923)
- Scorching Sun, Fierce Winds, Wild Fire (1978)
- Score (1974)
- The Score (1978)
- The Score (2001)
- The Score (2021)
- Score: A Film Music Documentary (2016)
- Score: A Hockey Musical (2010)
- Scores to Settle (1998)
- Scorn (2000)
- Scorned (2013)
- The Scorned (2005 TV)
- Scorned and Swindled (1984 TV)
- Scorpio (1973)
- Scorpio Nights (1985)
- Scorpio Rising (1964)
- Scorpion (2007)
- Scorpion (2018)
- The Scorpion King (1992)
- The Scorpion King series:
  - The Scorpion King (2002)
  - The Scorpion King 4: Quest for Power (2015)
  - The Scorpion King 3: Battle for Redemption (2012)
  - The Scorpion King 2: Rise of a Warrior (2008)
- Scorpion in Love (2013)
- The Scorpion with Two Tails (1982)
- Scorpion's Revenge (1997)
- Scotched in Scotland (1954)
- Scotland, PA (2001)
- Scotland Yard (1930)
- Scotland Yard (1941)
- Scotland Yard Hunts Dr. Mabuse (1963)
- Scotland Yard Investigator (1945)
- The Scotland Yard Mystery (1934)
- Scotland Yet (2014)
- Scott of the Antarctic (1948)
- Scott Pilgrim vs. the World (2010)
- Scott Walker: 30 Century Man (2006)
- Scottsboro: An American Tragedy (2001)
- Scotty Finds a Home (1935)
- Scotty and the Secret History of Hollywood (2017)
- The Scoundrel (1931)
- The Scoundrel (1935)
- The Scoundrel (1939)
- The Scoundrel (1988)
- The Scoundrel's Wife (2002)
- The Scourge (1922)
- The Scourge of the Desert (1915)
- The Scourge of God (1920)
- The Scout (1994)
- The Scout (2025)
- Scout toujours... (1985)
- Scout's Honor (1980 TV)
- The Scouting Book for Boys (2009)
- Scoutman (2000)
- Scram! (1932)
- Scramble (1970)
- Scrambled (2023)
- Scrambled Aches (1957)
- Scrambled Brains (1951)
- Scrambled Eggs (1939)
- Scrambled Eggs (1976)
- Scrambled Wives (1921)
- Scrap (2022)
- Scrap Happy Daffy (1943)
- Scrap Heaven (2005)
- Scrap the Japs (1942)
- Scrapbook (2000)
- Scrapper (2011)
- The Scrapper (1917)
- The Scrappin' Kid (1926)
- Scratch (2001)
- Scratch (2008)
- Scratch (2010)
- Scratch (2015)
- Scratch and Crow (1995)
- Scratch My Back (1920)
- Scratch-As-Catch-Can (1932)
- Scratched (1916)
- Scratches in the Table (1998)
- Scrawl (2015)
- Scream (1981)
- Scream series:
  - Scream: (1996 & 2022)
  - Scream 2 (1997)
  - Scream 3 (2000)
  - Scream 4 (2011)
  - Scream VI (2023)
  - Scream 7 (2026)
- Scream of the Banshee (2011 TV)
- Scream Blacula Scream (1973)
- Scream Bloody Murder (1973)
- Scream of the Demon Lover (1970)
- Scream for Help (1984)
- A Scream in the Night (1919)
- A Scream in the Night (1934)
- Scream Park (2013)
- Scream Queen Hot Tub Party (1991)
- Scream and Scream Again (1970)
- Scream of Stone (1991)
- A Scream in the Streets (1973)
- The Scream Team (2002 TV)
- Scream of the Wolf (1974 TV)
- Scream, Baby, Scream (1969)
- Scream, Pretty Peggy (1973 TV)
- Scream, Queen! My Nightmare on Elm Street (2019)
- Screamboat (2025)
- Screamers (1995)
- Screamers (2006)
- Screamers (2016)
- Screamers: The Hunting (2009)
- Screaming Eagles (1956)
- Screaming Jets (1951)
- Screaming Masterpiece (2005)
- Screaming Mimi (1958)
- The Screaming Shadow (1920)
- The Screaming Skull (1958)
- The Screaming Woman (1972 TV)
- Screamplay (1985)
- Screams of a Winter Night (1979)
- Screen Souvenirs (1932)
- Screen Test (1937)
- Screenagers (2016)
- Screening (2006)
- Screw Loose (1999)
- The Screwball (1943)
- Screwball Hotel (1988)
- Screwballs (1983)
- Screwballs II (1985)
- The Screwdriver (1941)
- Screwed (2000)
- The Screwy Truant (1945)
- The Scribbler (2014)
- The Scribe (1966)
- The Scriptwriter (2016)
- Scrooge: (1913, 1935, 1951 & 1970)
- Scrooge, or, Marley's Ghost (1901)
- Scrooge: A Christmas Carol (2022)
- Scrooged (1988)
- The Scrub Lady (1917)
- Scrub Me Mama with a Boogie Beat (1941)
- Scudda Hoo! Scudda Hay! (1948)
- Sculpting Memory (2015)
- The Sculptor (2009)
- Scum: (1977 TV & 1979)
- Scum of the Earth (1974)
- Scum of the Earth! (1963)
- Scumbag (2017)
- Scummy Man (2006)
- Scuola di ladri (1986)
- Scuola di ladri - Parte seconda (1987)
- Scusa ma ti chiamo amore (2008)
- Scusa se è poco (1982)
- Scusate il ritardo (1983)
- Scusi lei è normale? (1979)
- The Scuttlers (1920)
- The Scythian (2018)

=== Se ===
- Se Amar Mon Kereche (2012)
- Se arrienda (2005)
- Se mi vuoi bene (2019)
- Se solicitan modelos (1954)
- Se son rose (2018)

==== Sea ====
- The Sea: (1933, 2000, 2002 & 2013)
- The Sea Around Us (1953)
- Sea Beast (2008 TV)
- The Sea Beast: (1926 & 2022)
- The Sea Chase (1955)
- Sea Devils: (1931, 1937 & 1953)
- Sea Dogs (1916)
- Sea Dogs of Australia (1913)
- Sea Fever (2019)
- Sea Fighting in Greece (1897)
- Sea Fog (2014)
- Sea Fury: (1929 & 1958)
- The Sea Ghost (1931)
- The Sea God (1930)
- The Sea Hawk (1940)
- Sea Horses (1926)
- The Sea Inside (2004)
- Sea Legs (1930)
- Sea Lions of the Galapagos (2025)
- Sea of Love: (1955 & 1989)
- Sea Monsters: A Prehistoric Adventure (2007)
- Sea Point Days (2008)
- Sea Racketeers (1937)
- Sea Raiders (1941)
- Sea Rex (2010)
- Sea Salts (1949)
- Sea Scouts (1939)
- The Sea of Trees (2015)
- The Sea Wolf: (1913, 1920, 1926, 1930, 1941 & 1993 TV)
- The Sea Wolves (1980)
- Seabiscuit (2003)
- The Seafarers (1953)
- Seafood (2001)
- Seal Team Six: The Raid on Osama Bin Laden (2012)
- Séance: (2006 & 2021)
- Séance on a Wet Afternoon (1964)
- Search for Beauty (1934)
- Search and Destroy: (1979 & 1995)
- Search Party (2014)
- The Searchers (1956)
- Searching (2018)
- Searching for Bobby Fischer (1993)
- Searching for Sugar Man (2012)
- Season of Monsters (1987)
- Season of the Witch: (1972 & 2011)
- The Seasoning House (2012)
- Seasons (2015)
- Seasons of Love (1999 TV)

==== Seb–Sec ====
- Sebastian: (1968, 1995 & 2017)
- Sebastian and the Sparrow (1988)
- Sebastian Star Bear: First Mission (1991)
- Sebastiane (1976)
- Seclusion Near a Forest (1976)
- Second Act (2018)
- Second Chance: (1947, 1950, 1953, 1976 & 1996)
- A Second Chance: (2014 & 2015)
- The Second Chance (2006)
- Second Chorus (1940)
- Second Coming (2014)
- Second in Command (2006)
- Second Fiddle: (1923, 1939 & 1957)
- The Second Hundred Years (1927)
- The Second Jungle Book: Mowgli & Baloo (1998)
- Second Skin: (1999 & 2008)
- Second Time Around (2001)
- The Second Time Around: (1961 & 2016)
- Second Time Lucky (1984)
- The Second Woman: (1950, 1953 & 2012)
- Secondhand Lions (2003)
- Seconds: (1966 & 2014)
- Seconds Apart (2011)
- Secret: (2007 & 2009)
- The Secret: (1955, 1974, 1990, 1992 TV, 2006, 2007 & 2016)
- The Secret: Dare to Dream (2020)
- Secret Admirer (1985)
- Secret Agent: (1936 & 1947)
- The Secret of the American Docks (1919)
- Secret Beyond the Door (1947)
- Secret of the Blue Room (1932)
- The Secret of the Blue Room (1933)
- The Secret of Cavelli (1934)
- Secret Ceremony (1968)
- The Secret Diaries of Miss Anne Lister (2010)
- The Secret Fury (1950)
- The Secret Garden: (1919, 1949, 1987 TV, 1993 & 2020)
- The Secret of the Grain (2007)
- Secret Headquarters (2022)
- Secret Honor (1984)
- Secret of the Incas (1954)
- The Secret of Kells (2009)
- A Secret Life (1999)
- The Secret Life of an American Wife (1968)
- The Secret Life of Bees (2008)
- The Secret Life of Girls (1999)
- The Secret Life of Pets (2016)
- The Secret Life of Pets 2 (2019)
- The Secret Life of Walter Mitty: (1947 & 2013)
- The Secret Life of Words (2005)
- The Secret Lives of Dentists (2004)
- The Secret of the Magic Gourd (2007)
- The Secret of My Success: (1965 & 1987)
- The Secret of NIMH (1982)
- The Secret of NIMH 2: Timmy to the Rescue (1997)
- Secret People (1952)
- The Secret of Roan Inish (1994)
- The Secret of Santa Vittoria (1969)
- The Secret Sin (1915)
- Secret of the Sphinx (1964)
- The Secret of the Submarine (1915)
- Secret Sunshine (2007)
- Secret Superstar (2017)
- Secret in Their Eyes (2016)
- The Secret in Their Eyes (2009)
- Secret Things (2002)
- Secret Treasure (2015)
- The Secret War of Harry Frigg (1968)
- Secret of the Wastelands (1941)
- Secret Window (2004)
- The Secret World of Arrietty (2010)
- Secretariat (2010)
- Secretary: (1976 & 2002)
- The Secretary: (1938 & 1995 TV)
- Secrets: (1924, 1933, 1968, 1971, 1992 American & 1992 Australian)
- The Secrets (2007)
- The Secrets of Jonathan Sperry (2008)
- Secrets & Lies (1996)
- Secrets of the Night (1924)
- The Secrets of the Red Sea (1937)
- The Secrets We Keep (2020)

==== Sed–See ====
- Sedap Malam (1951)
- Sedige Sedu (1970)
- Sedina Hakki (1985)
- Sedona (2011)
- Sedotti e bidonati (1964)
- Seduce Me (2013)
- Seduced and Abandoned: (1964 & 2013)
- Seduced and Betrayed (1995 TV)
- Seduced by Madness (1996 TV)
- The Seducer of Granada (1953)
- The Seducers (1969)
- Seducing Doctor Lewis (2003)
- Seducing Maarya (2000)
- Seducing Mr. Perfect (2006)
- Seductio (1987)
- Seduction: (1973, 1981 & 2013)
- The Seduction (1982)
- The Seduction of Joe Tynan (1979)
- The Seduction of Mimi (1972)
- Seduction: The Cruel Woman (1985)
- See America Thirst (1930)
- See Angkor and Die (1993)
- See Anthony Run (2005)
- See Arnold Run (2005 TV)
- See-Bar (1980)
- See China and Die (1981 TV)
- See Girl Run (2012)
- See Grace Fly (2003)
- See Here, Private Hargrove (1944)
- See How She Runs (1978 TV)
- See How They Dance (2011)
- See How They Fall (1994)
- See How They Run: (1955, 1964 TV, 2006 & 2022)
- See for Me (2021)
- See No Evil: (1971 & 2006)
- See No Evil, Hear No Evil (1989)
- See the Sea (1997)
- See Spot Run (2001)
- See You in Hell, My Darling (1999)
- See You in the Morning (1989)
- See You Next Tuesday (2013)
- See You in the Next War (1980)
- See You Then (2021)
- See You in Valhalla (2015)
- See You Yesterday (2019)
- Seed: (1931 & 2007)
- The Seed: (2006 & 2021)
- Seed of Chucky (2004)
- The Seed of the Sacred Fig (2024)
- Seeds of Yesterday (2015)
- SeeFood (2011)
- Seeing Allred (2018)
- Seeing Other People (2004)
- The Seeker: The Dark Is Rising (2007)
- The Seekers: (1954 & 1979 TV)
- Seeking a Friend for the End of the World (2012)
- Seeking Justice (2011)
- Seema: (1955 & 1971)
- Seems Like Old Times (1980)

==== Seh–Sem ====
- Sehra (1963)
- Sehnsucht (1920)
- Sei (2018)
- Sei Chokh (1976)
- Sei Lá (2014)
- Seiji: Riku no Sakana (2012)
- Seiryū no dōkutsu (1956)
- Seize the Day (1986)
- Seized (2020)
- Seizure (1974)
- Sekal Has to Die (1998)
- Sekigahara (2017)
- Seksmisja (1984)
- Selah and the Spades (2019)
- Selam (2013)
- Selamat Berdjuang, Masku! (1951)
- Selamuthu Pinna (2004)
- Selänne (2013)
- Selbe: One Among Many (1983)
- Selena (1997)
- Self (2024)
- Self Control (1938)
- Self Defense: (1932 & 1983)
- Self Helpless (2010)
- Self Made (2014)
- Self Made Lady (1932)
- Self Medicated (2005)
- A Self Made Hero (1996)
- The Self Seeker (1929)
- The Self-Destruction of Gia (2003)
- A Self-Made Failure (1924)
- Self-Made Maids (1950)
- A Self-Made Widow (1917)
- The Self-Made Wife (1923)
- Self-Portrait (1969)
- Self/less (2015)
- Selfie: (2014, 2018 & 2019)
- Selfie from Hell (2018)
- Selfie King (2020)
- Selfie Raja (2016)
- The Selfish Giant: (1972 & 2013)
- Selkie (2000)
- Sell Out! (2008)
- Sella Turcica (2010)
- Sellam Nethnam Lellam (2017)
- Selling Innocence (2005 TV)
- Selling Out (1972)
- Selma (2014)
- Selvaggi (1995)
- Selvam: (1966, 2005 & 2011)
- Semana Santa: (2002 & 2015)
- Semana santa en Acapulco (1981)
- Sembattai (2012)
- Sembilu (1994)
- Sembilu 2005 (2005)
- Semen, A Love Story (2005)
- Semi-Pro (2008)
- Semi-Silk (1925)
- Semi-Tough (1977)
- Semillas que el mar arrastra (2008)
- Seminole (1953)
- Seminole Uprising (1955)
- Semmelweis: (1940 & 1952)
- Semma (2018)
- Semma Botha Aagathey (2018)
- Semne în pustiu (1996)
- Semper Fi (2019)
- Semper Fi: Always Faithful (2011)
- Semyon Dezhnev (1983)

==== Sen–Ser ====
- Sen Yan's Devotion (1924)
- Sena (2003)
- Sena/Quina, la inmortalidad del cangrejo (2005)
- Senathipathi (1996)
- Send a Gorilla (1988)
- Send a Woman When the Devil Fails (1957)
- Send for Paul Temple (1946)
- Send Help (2026)
- Send Me No Flowers (1964)
- Send Me to the Clouds (2019)
- The Sender (1982)
- Seneca – On the Creation of Earthquakes (2023)
- Sengoku Jieitai 1549 (2005)
- Sengottai (1996)
- Senior (2015)
- Senior Moment (2021)
- Senior Project (2014)
- Senior Prom (1958)
- Senior Trip (1981 TV)
- Senior Year: (2010 & 2022)
- Senna (2010)
- Senorita (1927)
- Senorita from the West (1945)
- Sensation (1936)
- The Sensation of Sight (2006)
- Sensations (1975)
- Sensations of 1945 (1944)
- Sense and Sensibility (1995)
- Senseless (1998)
- Senso (1954)
- The Sentimental Bloke: (1918, 1932 & 1963 TV)
- Sentimental Value (2025)
- The Sentinel: (1977 & 2006)
- Sen'un Ajia no Joō (1957)
- Seo Bok (2021)
- Seopyeonje (1993)
- Seoul Train (2005)
- Separate Lies (2005)
- Separate Tables (1958)
- Separation: (1967, 2013 & 2021)
- A Separation (2011)
- September: (1984, 1987, 2003 & 2011)
- September 12th (2005)
- September 30, 1955 (1977)
- September Affair (1950)
- September Dawn (2007)
- The September Issue (2009)
- September Nights (1957)
- September in the Rain (1937)
- September Storm (1960)
- Sequel to the Diamond from the Sky (1916)
- Seraphim Falls (2007)
- A Serbian Film (2010)
- Serenade (1956)
- Serendipity (2001)
- Serena (2014)
- Serene Velocity (1970)
- Serenity: (2005 & 2019)
- Sergeant Rutledge (1960)
- Sergeant Ryker (1968)
- Sergeant York (1941)
- Serial (1980)
- Serial Lover (1998)
- Serial Mom (1994)
- Série noire (1979)
- Series 7: The Contenders (2001)
- Serious Charge (1959)
- A Serious Man (2009)
- Serious Moonlight: (1983 & 2009)
- Serpent of the Nile (1953)
- The Serpent and the Rainbow (1988)
- The Serpent's Egg (1977)
- The Serpent's Kiss (1997)
- Serpentinen Tanz (1895)
- Serpico (1973)
- The Servant: (1963, 1989 & 2010)
- Servants' Entrance (1934)
- Serve the People (2022)
- Service de nuit (1943)
- Serving Sara (2002)

==== Ses–Sew ====
- Sesame Street Presents: Follow That Bird (1985)
- Session 9 (2001)
- The Sessions (2012)
- Set It Off (1996)
- Set It Up (2018)
- The Set-Up: (1926, 1949 & 1995)
- Setoutsumi (2016)
- Settai (2013)
- Sette scialli di seta gialla (1972)
- Setup (2011)
- Seven: (1979, 1995, 2019 Indian & 2019 Nigerian)
- Seven Beauties (1975)
- Seven Blood-Stained Orchids (1972)
- Seven Blows of The Dragon (1972)
- Seven Brides for Seven Brothers (1954)
- Seven Chances (1925)
- Seven Days in May (1964)
- Seven Days to Noon (1950)
- Seven Days in Utopia (2011)
- Seven Days... Seven Nights (1960)
- The Seven Deadly Sins: (1952 & 1962)
- Seven Deaths in the Cat's Eye (1973)
- Seven Hills of Rome (1957)
- Seven Keys to Baldpate: (1916, 1917, 1925, 1929, 1935 & 1947)
- Seven Minutes in Heaven (1985)
- The Seven Pearls (1917)
- The Seven-Per-Cent Solution (1977)
- Seven Psychopaths (2012)
- Seven Pounds (2008)
- The Seven Red Berets (1969)
- Seven Samurai (1954)
- Seven Sweethearts (1942)
- Seven Swords (2005)
- The Seven Tapes (2012)
- The Seven from Texas (1964)
- Seven Times Seven (1969)
- Seven Up! (1964)
- Seven Wonders of the World (1956)
- The Seven Year Itch (1955)
- Seven Years in Tibet: (1956 & 1997)
- The Seven-Ups (1973)
- Seventeen Again (2000)
- Seventeen Moments of Spring (1973)
- Seventeen Years (1999)
- The Seventh Bullet (1972)
- The Seventh Continent: (1966 & 1989)
- The Seventh Cross (1944)
- The Seventh Curse (1986)
- Seventh Heaven: (1927, 1937 & 1993)
- Seventh Moon (2008)
- The Seventh Seal (1957)
- The Seventh Sign (1988)
- The Seventh Sin (1957)
- Seventh Son (2014)
- The Seventh Son (1926)
- The Seventh Sword (1962)
- The Seventh Veil (1945)
- The Seventh Victim (1943)
- The Seventh Victim (1964)
- Severed (2005)
- A Severa (1931)
- Severance (2006)
- Sew Torn (2024)

==== Sex–Sey ====
- Sex: (1920 & 2024)
- Sex After Kids (2013)
- (Sex) Appeal (2014)
- SexAPPeal (2022)
- Sex and Blood in the Trail of the Treasure (1972)
- Sex and Breakfast (2007)
- Sex in Chains (1928)
- Sex and the City (2008)
- Sex and the City 2 (2010)
- Sex and the College Girl (1964)
- Sex Is Comedy (2002)
- Sex Competition (2013)
- Sex Crimes Unit (2011 TV)
- Sex Crimes and the Vatican (2006 TV)
- Sex and Death 101 (2007)
- Sex, Death and Bowling (2015)
- Sex Doll (2016)
- Sex, Drink and Bloodshed (2004)
- Sex Drive (2008)
- Sex Ed (2014)
- Sex Is a Four Letter Word (1995)
- Sex & Fury (1973)
- Sex Hygiene (1942)
- Sex Jack (1970)
- Sex Kittens Go to College (1960)
- Sex and Lies in Sin City (2008 TV)
- Sex Life of Plants (2015)
- Sex Life of Robots (2006)
- Sex Lives of the Potato Men (2004)
- Sex with Love (2003)
- Sex, Love, Misery: New New York (2022)
- Sex and Lucia (2001)
- Sex Madness (1938)
- The Sex Monster (1999)
- Sex & Mrs. X (2000 TV)
- Sex, Okra and Salted Butter (2008)
- Sex and the Other Man (1995)
- Sex and the Other Woman (1972)
- Sex, Party and Lies (2009)
- Sex & Philosophy (2005)
- Sex Phone and the Girl Next Door (2003)
- Sex Positive (2008)
- Sex Pot (1975)
- Sex Quartet (1966)
- Sex Sells: The Making of Touché (2005)
- Sex and the Single Girl (1964)
- Sex and the Single Mom (2003 TV)
- Sex Slaves (2005 TV)
- The Sex of the Stars (1993)
- Sex Tape (2014)
- Sex of the Witch (1973)
- Sex World (1977)
- Sex and Zen (1992)
- Sex and Zen II (1996)
- Sex and Zen III (1998)
- Sex Is Zero (2002)
- Sex Is Zero 2 (2007)
- sex, lies, and videotape (1989)
- Sex: The Annabel Chong Story (1999)
- Sexmission (1984)
- Sexo, pudor y lágrimas (1999)
- Sextette (1978)
- Sextuplets (2019)
- Sexual Meditation: Room with View (1971)
- Sexy Beast (2000)
- Sexy Susan Sins Again (1968)
- Seymour: An Introduction (2014)

=== Sg ===
- Sgt. Bilko (1996)
- Sgt. Ernesto 'Boy' Ybañez: Tirtir Gang (1988)
- Sgt. Kabukiman N.Y.P.D. (1991)
- Sgt. Pepper's Lonely Hearts Club Band (1978)
- Sgt. Stubby: An American Hero (2018)
- Sgt. Will Gardner (2019)

=== Sh ===
==== Sha ====
- The Shack (2017)
- Shaadi Se Pehle (2006)
- Shade (2003)
- The Shade (1999)
- Shades of Fern (1986)
- Shades of the Heart (2019)
- Shadow: (1956, 1971, 2009 Hindi, 2009 Italian, 2013 & 2018)
- The Shadow: (1920, 1933, 1937, 1954, 1994 & unreleased)
- Shadow Builder (1998)
- Shadow in the Cloud (2020)
- Shadow Conspiracy (1997)
- Shadow of a Doubt (1943)
- Shadow Magic (2000)
- Shadow Man: (1988 & 2006)
- Shadow of the Thin Man (1941)
- Shadow of the Vampire (2000)
- Shadowboxer (2006)
- Shadowlands: (1985 TV & 1993)
- Shadowless Sword (2005)
- Shadows: (1916, 1919, 1922, 1931, 1953, 1959, 2007 & 2020)
- Shadows and Fog (1992)
- Shadows of Forgotten Ancestors (1965)
- Shadows of a Great City (1913)
- Shadows of a Hot Summer (1978)
- Shadows and Lies (2010)
- Shadows in Paradise: (1986 & 2010)
- Shadows in the Sun (2001)
- Shaft series:
  - Shaft: (1971, 2000 & 2019)
  - Shaft in Africa (1973)
  - Shaft's Big Score (1972)
- Shag (1989)
- The Shaggy D.A. (1976)
- The Shaggy Dog: (1959 & 2006)
- Shake Hands With the Devil: (1959 & 2007)
- Shake Hands with the Devil: The Journey of Roméo Dallaire (2004)
- Shake! Otis at Monterey (1987)
- Shakedown: (1936, 1950, 1988 & 2018)
- The Shakedown: (1929 & 1959)
- Shakedown: Return of the Sontarans (1995)
- Shakes the Clown (1991)
- Shakespeare in Love (1998)
- Shakespeare Wallah (1965)
- The Shakiest Gun in the West (1968)
- Shalako (1968)
- Shall We Dance: (1937, 1996 & 2004)
- Shallow Grave (1994)
- Shallow Ground (2005)
- Shallow Hal (2001)
- The Shallows (2016)
- Shame: (1921, 1922, 1968 & 2011)
- Shampoo (1975)
- Shamrock Hill (1949)
- Shane (1953)
- Shang-Chi and the Legend of the Ten Rings (2021)
- Shanghai Dreams (2005)
- Shanghai Express (1932)
- The Shanghai Gesture (1941)
- Shanghai Kiss (2007)
- Shanghai Knights (2003)
- Shanghai Noon (2000)
- Shanghai Story (2004)
- Shanghai Surprise (1986)
- Shanghai Triad (1995)
- Shaolin (2011)
- The Shaolin Drunken Monk (1981)
- Shaolin Soccer (2001)
- Shaolin Temple: (1976 & 1982)
- Shaolin Wooden Men (1976)
- Shaolin and Wu Tang (1981)
- Shape of Momo (2025)
- Shape of the Moon (2004)
- The Shape of Things (2003)
- The Shape of Water (2017)
- Shararat: (1944, 1959, 2002 & 2003)
- Shark: (2000 & 2021)
- Shark! (1969)
- The Shark: (1920 & 1930)
- Shark: Mind of a Demon (2006)
- Shark Attack trilogy:
  - Shark Attack (1999)
  - Shark Attack 2 (2000)
  - Shark Attack 3: Megalodon (2004)
- Shark Night (2011)
- Shark Skin Man and Peach Hip Girl (1999)
- Shark Tale (2004)
- Sharknado series:
  - Sharknado (2013)
  - Sharknado 2: The Second One (2014)
  - Sharknado 3: Oh Hell No! (2015)
  - Sharknado: The 4th Awakens (2016)
  - Sharknado 5: Global Swarming (2017)
  - The Last Sharknado: It's About Time (2018)
- Sharks' Treasure (1975)
- Sharkwater (2006)
- Sharky's Machine (1981)
- Sharp Stick (2022)
- Shaso (1989)
- Shatter Dead (1994)
- Shattered: (1921, 1972, 1991, 2007, 2011 & 2022)
- Shattered Glass (2003)
- Shaukeen (1981)
- Shaun of the Dead (2004)
- Shaun the Sheep Movie (2015)
- A Shaun the Sheep Movie: Farmageddon (2019)
- The Shawshank Redemption (1994)
- Shazam! (2019)
- Shazam! Fury of the Gods (2023)

==== She ====
- She: (1911, 1916, 1917, 1925, 1935, 1954, 1965 & 1984)
- The She Beast (1966)
- She Couldn't Say No: (1930, 1939, 1940 & 1954)
- She Creature (2001)
- She Dances (2026)
- She-Devil (1989)
- She Dies Tomorrow (2020)
- She Done Him Wrong (1933)
- She Gods of Shark Reef (1958)
- She Grazed Horses on Concrete (1982)
- She Hate Me (2004)
- She Never Died (2019)
- She Remembers, He Forgets (2015)
- She Rides Shotgun (2025)
- She Said (2022)
- She Shoulda Said No! (1949)
- She Stoops to Conquer (1914)
- She Was an Acrobat's Daughter (1937)
- She Wore a Yellow Ribbon (1949)
- She's All That (1999)
- She's Gotta Have It (1986)
- She's Having a Baby (1988)
- She's the Man (2006)
- She's the One (1996)
- She's Out of Control (1989)
- She's Out of My League (2010)
- She's a Sheik (1927)
- She's So Lovely (1997)
- She's Too Young (2004)
- She-Devil (1989)
- She-Wolf of London (1946)
- Sheena (1984)
- The Sheep (1920)
- The Sheep Detectives (2026)
- The Sheep Thief (1997)
- Sheep Without a Shepherd (2019)
- The Sheepman (1958)
- Shéhérazade (1963 film)
- Shéhérazade (2018 film)
- The Sheik (1921)
- Sheitan (2006)
- Shelby American (2019)
- Shelby Oaks (2025)
- Shell: (2012 & 2024)
- Shell and Joint (2019)
- Shelter: (2007, 2010 & 2026)
- Shelter Dogs (2003)
- The Sheltering Sky (1990)
- Shenandoah (1965)
- Shepherd (2021)
- The Shepherd of the Hills: (1919, 1928, 1941 & 1964)
- The Shepherd: Border Patrol (2008)
- The Sheriff of Fractured Jaw (1958)
- The Sheriff of Hope Eternal (1921)
- Sherlock Gnomes (2018)
- Sherlock Holmes: (1916, 1922, 1932, 2009 & 2010)
- Sherlock Holmes Baffled (1900)
- Sherlock Holmes Faces Death (1943)
- Sherlock Holmes in the Great Murder Mystery (1908)
- Sherlock Holmes and the Secret Weapon (1943)
- Sherlock Holmes and the Voice of Terror (1942)
- Sherlock Holmes in Washington (1943)
- Sherlock Holmes: A Game of Shadows (2011)
- Sherlock Jr. (1924)
- Sherman's March: A Meditation on the Possibility of Romantic Love In the South During an Era of Nuclear Weapons Proliferation (1986)
- Sherman's Way (2009)
- Sherpa (2015)
- Sherrybaby (2006)

==== Shh–Shi ====
- Shh. (2001)
- Shh... (2009)
- Shh Eccharike (2015)
- Shhh (1975)
- Shhh! (1993)
- Shi Er Sheng Xiao Cheng Shi Ying Xiong (2014)
- The Shielding Shadow (1916)
- Shikake-nin Baian (1981)
- Shiki-Jitsu (2000)
- Shimajirō to Fufu no Daibōken: Sukue! Nanairo no Hana (2013)
- Shimajiro to Kujira no Uta (2014)
- Shimajirō to Ōkina Ki (2015)
- Shimmer Lake (2017)
- Shine (1996)
- Shine a Light (2008)
- The Shining (1980)
- The Shining Hour (1938)
- Shining Through (1992)
- Shining Victory (1941)
- Shinjuku Incident (2009)
- Shinjuku Triad Society (1995)
- Shinobi: Heart Under Blade (2005)
- Shinsukki Blues (2004)
- Ship Ahoy (1942)
- A Ship Bound for India (1947)
- A Ship Comes In (1928)
- Ship of Fools (1965)
- The Ship from Shanghai (1930)
- Ship of Theseus (2012)
- The Shipment (2001)
- The Shipping News (2001)
- The Shiralee (1957)
- Shiri (1999)
- Shirley: (1922, 2020 & 2024)
- Shirley Valentine (1989)
- Shiroi Kyotō (1966)
- Shithouse (2020)
- Shiver: (2003 & 2012)
- Shivering Shakespeare (1930)
- Shivers: (1975 & 1981)
- Shiza (2004)

==== Sho ====
- Shoah (1985)
- Shock: (1946, 1977, 2004 & 2006)
- The Shock (1923)
- Shock Corridor (1963)
- A Shock to the System (1990)
- Shock Treatment (1981)
- Shock Waves (1977)
- Shocker (1989)
- Shocking Asia (1974)
- Shocking Asia II: The Last Taboos (1985)
- Shoemaker (1996)
- The Shoemaker and the Doll (1913)
- The Shoemaker and the Elves (1935)
- Shoes: (1916 & 2012)
- The Shoes of the Fisherman (1968)
- Shoeshine (1946)
- Shogun Assassin (1980)
- Shogun and Little Kitchen (1992)
- Shogun's Samurai (1978)
- Shogun's Shadow (1989)
- Shokubutsu Zukan: Unmei no Koi, Hiroimashita (2016)
- Sholay (1975)
- Shoot 'Em Up (2007)
- Shoot First, Die Later (1974)
- Shoot to Kill: (1947, 1960, 1988 & 1990 TV)
- Shoot the Moon (1982)
- Shoot the Piano Player (1960)
- Shooter: (1988 TV, 2007, 2016 & 2022)
- The Shooting (1968)
- Shooting Dogs (2005)
- Shooting Fish (1997)
- Shooting the Mafia (2019)
- Shooting at the Moon (2003)
- The Shootist (1976)
- Shoot-Out at Medicine Bend (1957)
- Shootout at Wadala (2013)
- The Shop Around the Corner (1940)
- The Shop on Main Street (1965)
- Shopgirl (2001)
- Shoplifters (2018)
- Shoplifters of the World (2021)
- Shopping: (1994 & 2013)
- Shor in the City (2011)
- Short Circuit: (1943, 1986 & 2019)
- Short Circuit 2 (1988)
- Short Cuts (1993)
- A Short Film About Killing (1988)
- A Short Film About Love (1988)
- Short Term 12 (2013)
- Shortbus (2006)
- Shorts: (2009 & 2013)
- Shot Caller (2017)
- Show Boat: (1929, 1936 & 1951)
- Show Girl (1928)
- Show Me Love (1998)
- Show Me the Ghost (2021)
- Showdown: (1942, 1963, 1973 & 1993)
- The Showdown: (1928, 1940, 1950 & 2011)
- Showdown at Abilene (1956)
- Showdown at Boot Hill (1958)
- Showdown at the Cotton Mill (1978)
- Showdown in Little Tokyo (1991)
- Showgirl in Hollywood (1930)
- Showgirls (1995)
- Showing Up (2022)
- The Showman (1930)
- Showtime (2002)

==== Shr–Shy ====
- Shraap 3D (TBD)
- Shraddhanjali (1993)
- Shravana Banthu (1984)
- Shravani Subramanya (2013)
- Shred (2008)
- Shredder (2003)
- Shredder Orpheus (1990)
- Shredderman Rules (2007 TV)
- Shree: (2002 & 2013)
- Shree 420 (1955)
- Shree Krishna Gaarudi (1958)
- Shreelancer (2017)
- Shreemaan Aashique (1993)
- Shreeman Funtoosh (1965)
- Shreeman v/s Shreemati (2025)
- Shrek series:
  - Shrek (2001)
  - Shrek 2 (2004)
  - Shrek the Third (2007)
  - Shrek Forever After (2010)
- Shrestha Bangali (2017)
- Shri (2006)
- Shri Chaitanya Mahaprabhu (1953)
- Shri Ganesh Mahima (1950)
- Shri Hanuman Chalisa (2013)
- Shri Krishna Janma (1918)
- Shri Krishna Leela (1971)
- Shri Rama Bantu (1979)
- Shri Ramanuja (1943)
- Shri Shaila Mahathme (1961)
- Shriek If You Know What I Did Last Friday the 13th (2000)
- Shriek of the Mutilated (1974)
- Shrieker (1997)
- Shriman Prithviraj (1973)
- Shriman Satyawadi (1960)
- Shriman Shrimati (1982)
- Shrimanthana Magalu (1977)
- Shrimathi (2011)
- Shrimati (2022)
- Shrimp (2018)
- Shrimps for a Day (1934)
- Shrink (2009)
- Shrirasthu Shubhamasthu (2000)
- Shrooms (2007)
- Shrungara Kavya (1993)
- Shrunken Heads (1994)
- Shruthi (1990)
- Shttl (2022)
- Shu Thayu? (2018)
- Shubh Kaamna (1983)
- Shubh Mangal Saavdhan (2017)
- Shubh Mangal Savdhan (1992)
- Shubh Mangal Zyada Saavdhan (2020)
- Shubh Yatra (2023)
- Shubha Bol Narya (1990)
- Shudra: The Rising (2012)
- Shukriya: Till Death Do Us Apart (2004)
- Shunkinshō (1976)
- Shuruaat Ka Interval (2014)
- Shut In: (2016 & 2022)
- Shut My Big Mouth (1942)
- Shut Up and Kiss Me (2004)
- Shut Up and Play the Hits (2012)
- Shut Up and Shoot! (2006)
- Shut Up and Shoot Me (2005)
- Shut Up & Sing (2006)
- Shutter: (2004, 2008, 2012 & 2014)
- Shutter Island (2010)
- Shuttle (2009)
- Shuttlecock (1991)
- Shuttlecock Boys (2011)
- Shyam (2016)
- A Shyam Gopal Varma Film (2015)
- Shyama (1986)
- Shyamala (1952)
- Shyamala Chechi (1965)
- Shyamchi Aai (1953)
- Shyamol Chhaya (2005)
- Shylock: (1940 & 2020)
- Shylock's Children (2023)
- Shyloo (2011)
- Shyness Machine Girl (2009)

=== Si ===
- Si accettano miracoli (2015)
- Si Pitoeng (1931)
- Si Si Senor (1930)
- Si vive una volta sola (2021)

==== Sia–Sim ====
- Sia, The Dream of the Python (2001)
- Siamese Cat (1943)
- Siargao (2017)
- Sibel (2018)
- Sibelius (2003)
- Siberiade (1979)
- Siberia and Him (2019)
- Siberian Lady Macbeth (1961)
- Siberians (1940)
- Sibling Rivalry (1990)
- Sicario: (1994 & 2015)
- Sicario: Day of the Soldado (2018)
- The Sicilian Clan (1969)
- The Sicilian Connection (1972)
- Sick Girl (2023)
- Sick of Myself (2022)
- Sick: The Life and Death of Bob Flanagan, Supermasochist (1997)
- Sicko (2007)
- Sid and Nancy (1986)
- Side Effects (2013)
- Side Out (1990)
- Side by Side: (1975 & 2012)
- Side Street: (1929 & 1950)
- Side Street Story (1950)
- Side Streets: (1933, 1934 & 1998)
- Sidewalks of New York: (1923, 1931 & 2001)
- Sideways (2004)
- Sideways (2009)
- Sidney (2022)
- Siege: (1925 & 1940)
- The Siege: (1956 & 1998)
- Siegfried (1924)
- Sigade revolutsioon (2004)
- Sightless (2020)
- Sightseers (2012)
- The Sign of the Cross: (1914 & 1932)
- The Signal: (2007 & 2014)
- The Signalman (1976) (TV)
- Signature Move (2017)
- Le Signe du Lion (1962)
- Signore & Signori (1965)
- Signs (2002)
- Siin me oleme! (1979)
- Sikandar: (1941 & 2009)
- Silence: (1926, 1931, 1963, 1971, 2010, 2013 & 2016)
- The Silence: (1963, 1998, 2006 TV, 2010, 2015 & 2019)
- Silence and Cry (1968)
- Silence of the Heart (1984) (TV)
- The Silence of the Lambs (1991)
- The Silence of the Marsh (2019)
- Silence of the North (1981)
- Silenced: (2011 & 2026)
- The Silencers (1966)
- The Silencing (2020)
- Silent Action (1975)
- The Silent Enemy: (1930 & 1958)
- Silent Hill (2006)
- Silent Hill: Revelation 3D (2012)
- The Silent Historian (2011)
- Silent House (2011)
- The Silent House: (1929 & 2010)
- Silent Light (2007)
- Silent Madness (1984)
- Silent Movie (1976)
- Silent Night: (1995, 2002 TV, 2012 & 2021)
- Silent Night, Bloody Night (1974)
- Silent Night, Deadly Night series:
  - Silent Night, Deadly Night (1984)
  - Silent Night, Deadly Night Part 2 (1987)
  - Silent Night, Deadly Night 3: Better Watch Out! (1989)
  - Silent Night, Deadly Night 4: Initiation (1990)
  - Silent Night, Deadly Night 5: The Toy Maker (1991)
- SIlent Panic (2019)
- The Silent Partner: (1917, 1923, 1931, 1939 & 1978)
- Silent Rage (1982)
- Silent Running (1971)
- Silent Tongue (1994)
- Silent Warnings (2003) (TV)
- Silent Witness (2013)
- The Silent World (1956)
- Silk: (2006 & 2007)
- Silk Road (2021)
- The Silk Road (1988)
- Silk Stockings: (1927 & 1957)
- Silkwood (1983)
- Silmido (2003)
- Silu (1987)
- Silver & Black (2019)
- Silver Bullet (1985)
- The Silver Chalice (1954)
- Silver City: (1951, 1984 & 2004)
- Silver Dollar (1932)
- The Silver Lining: (1915, 1919, 1921, 1927 & 1932)
- Silver Linings Playbook (2012)
- Silver Lode (1954)
- Silver Streak: (1934 & 1976)
- Silverado (1985)
- The Simian Line (2000)
- The Similars (2015)
- Simon Birch (1998)
- Simon of the Desert (1965)
- Simon Killer (2012)
- Simon Says (2006)
- Simon Sez (1999)
- Simon, Simon (1970)
- Simone: (1918, 1926 & 2002)
- Simpatico (2000)
- A Simple Death (1985)
- A Simple Favor (2018)
- A Simple Noodle Story (2009)
- Simple Passion (2020)
- A Simple Plan (1998)
- The Simple Things (1953)
- A Simple Twist of Fate (1994)
- A Simple Wish (1997)
- Simply Irresistible (1999)
- The Simpsons Movie (2007)

==== Sin ====
- Sin: (1915, 1971, 2003 & 2019)
- The Sin: (1965 & 2005)
- Sin City series:
  - Sin City (2005)
  - Sin City: A Dame to Kill For (2014)
- The Sin Eater (2001)
- The Sin of Madelon Claudet (1931)
- Sin Nombre (2009)
- Sin Takes a Holiday (1930)
- Sinbad (1993)
- Sinbad and the Eye of the Tiger (1977)
- Sinbad and The Minotaur (2011)
- Sinbad the Sailor: (1935 & 1947)
- Sinbad of the Seven Seas (1989)
- Sinbad: A Flying Princess and a Secret Island (2015)
- Sinbad: Beyond the Veil of Mists (2000)
- Sinbad: Legend of the Seven Seas (2003)
- Since Otar Left (2003)
- Since You Went Away (1944)
- Since You've Been Gone (1998) (TV)
- The Sinful Border (1951)
- The Sinful Dwarf (1973)
- The Sinful Nuns of Saint Valentine (1974)
- The Sinful Village: (1940, 1954 & 1966)
- The Sinful Woman (1916)
- Sing: (1989, 2016 American & 2016 Hungarian)
- Sing 2 (2021)
- Sing As We Go (1934)
- Sing Boy Sing (1958)
- Sing Sing (2023)
- Singapore: (1947 & 1960)
- Singapore Dreaming (2006)
- Singapore Sling (1990)
- Singin' in the Rain (1952)
- The Singing Detective (2003)
- The Singing Fool (1928)
- The Singing Revolution (2006)
- The Singing Ringing Tree (1957)
- A Single Man (2009)
- The Single Moms Club (2014)
- Single Room Furnished (1968)
- A Single Shot (2013)
- The Single Sin (1931)
- The Single Standard (1929)
- Single White Female (1992)
- Singles: (1992 & 2003)
- The Singles Ward (2002)
- Sinister (2012)
- Sinister 2 (2015)
- Sink the Bismarck! (1960)
- Sink or Swim: (1990 & 2018)
- Sinkin' in the Bathtub (1930)
- The Sinking of the Lusitania (1918)
- The Sinking of Sozopol (2014)
- Sinner (2007)
- The Sinner: (1928, 1940 & 1951)
- Sinners (2025)
- Sinners in Paradise (1938)
- Sinners and Saints (2010)
- Sinners in the Sun (1932)
- Sinners' Holiday (1930)
- The Sino-Dutch War 1661 (2000)
- Sins (2005)
- Sins of the Mother (2010)
- Sins of Our Youth (2014)
- Sint (2010)

==== Sio–Sit ====
- Sione's Wedding (2006)
- Sione's 2: Unfinished Business (2012)
- A Sip of Love (1984)
- Sipaayi (2016)
- Sir... I Love You (1991)
- Sir Last Chance (2009)
- Sir! No Sir! (2005)
- Sira (2023)
- The Siren: (1917 & 1927)
- SiREN (2016)
- Siren of Atlantis (1949)
- Siren of Bagdad (1953)
- Siren of the Tropics (1927)
- Sirens: (1994 & 1999)
- Sirens of the Caribbean (2007)
- Sirens of the Sea (1917)
- Sirf (2008)
- Sirf Ek Bandaa Kaafi Hai (2023)
- Sirf Tum (1999)
- Sirf Tum Hi To Ho (2019)
- Siri Daladagamanaya (2014)
- Siri Raja Siri (2008)
- Siri Sampadalu (1962)
- Siri Siri Muvva (1976)
- Sirius Remembered (1959)
- Sirivantha (2006)
- Sirocco (1951)
- Sirup (1990)
- Sisi & I (2023)
- Sisily 2km (2004)
- Sissi (1955)
- Sissy (2022)
- Sista Kontraktet (1998)
- Sister: (2012, 2018 & 2021)
- Sister Act (1992)
- Sister Act 2: Back in the Habit (1993)
- Sister Cupid (1987)
- Sister Death (2023)
- Sister Kenny (1946)
- Sister Wife (2000)
- Sister, Sister: (1982 TV & 1987)
- The Sisterhood of the Traveling Pants (2005)
- The Sisterhood of the Traveling Pants 2 (2008)
- Sisters: (1922, 1930, 1973, 2001, 2006 & 2015)
- The Sisters Brothers (2018)
- Sisters, or the Balance of Happiness (1979)
- Sisu (2022)
- Sisu: Road to Revenge (2025)
- Sitcom (1998)
- Sith Apprentice (2005)
- The Sitter (2011)
- Site (2025)
- Sitting Bull (1954)
- Sitting Pretty (1948)
- Sitting Target (1972)

==== Siv–Siz ====
- Siva Manasula Sakthi (2009)
- Siva Manasulo Sruthi (2012)
- Siva Rama Raju (2002)
- Siva Shankar (2004)
- Siva Thandavum (1977)
- Sivagami (1960)
- Sivaji: The Boss (2007)
- Sivakumarin Sabadham (2021)
- Sivamani (2003)
- Sivan (1999)
- Sivappathigaram (2006)
- Sivappu (2015)
- Sivappu Enakku Pidikkum (2017)
- Siwaiyaan (2022) (TV)
- Six (2012)
- Six Acts (2012)
- Six Black Horses (1962)
- Six Bridges to Cross (1955)
- Six Bullets (2012)
- Six Days, Seven Nights (1998)
- Six Days: Three Activists, Three Wars, One Dream (2013)
- Six Dance Lessons in Six Weeks (2014)
- Six Degrees of Separation (1993)
- Six Figures (2005)
- Six Gun Gospel (1943)
- Six Gun Man (1946)
- Six Gun Mesa (1950)
- Six Hours to Live (1932)
- Six: The Mark Unleashed (2004)
- Six Million and One (2011)
- Six Minutes to Midnight (2020)
- Six and One Half Times Eleven (1927)
- Six Pack (1982)
- Six Points About Emma (2011)
- Six Shooter (2004)
- Six by Sondheim (2013) (TV)
- Six Triple Eight (TBD)
- Six Ways To Sunday (1997)
- Six Weeks (1982)
- Six-Gun Gold (1941)
- Six-Gun Law (1948)
- Six-Gun Serenade (1947)
- Six-Gun Trail (1938)
- Six-String Samurai (1998)
- Sixpack Annie (1975)
- Sixteen: (1943, 2013 British & 2013 Indian)
- Sixteen Candles (1984)
- Sixteen Fathoms Deep (1934)
- Sixteen Tongues (2003)
- The Sixth (1981)
- The Sixth (2024)
- The Sixth Man (1997)
- The Sixth Sense (1999)
- Sixty Glorious Years (1938)
- Sixty Six (2006)
- Size Zero (2015)
- Sizzle (1981) (TV)

=== Sk ===
- Skanda (2023)
- Skarga (1991)
- Skateboard (1978)
- Skater Girl (2021)
- Skedaddle Gold (1927)
- Skeet (2024)
- Skeeter (1993)
- Skeleton Coast (1987)
- Skeleton Coast (2024)
- Skeleton Crew (2009)
- The Skeleton Dance (1929)
- The Skeleton Key (2005)
- Skeleton Man (2004) (TV)
- Skeleton of Mrs. Morales (1960)
- The Skeleton Twins (2014)
- Skeletons (2010)
- Skeletons in the Closet (2024)
- Skellig (2009)
- Sketch: (2007, 2018 & 2024)
- Sketch Artist (1992) (TV)
- Sketch Artist II: Hands That See (1995) (TV)
- Sketches of Kaitan City (2010)
- Ski Bum: The Warren Miller Story (2019)
- Ski Party (1965)
- Ski Patrol: (1940 & 1990)
- Ski School (1991)
- Ski School 2 (1994)
- Ski Troop Attack (1960)
- Ski for Two (1944)
- Skid Kids (1953)
- Skid Marks (2007)
- Skid Proof (1923)
- Skidoo (1968)
- Skies Are Not Just Blue (2018)
- Skillhouse (2025)
- Skills like This (2007)
- Skin: (1995, 2008, 2018 feature, 2018 short, 2019 & 2020)
- The Skin (1981)
- Skin & Bone (1996)
- Skin Deep: (1922, 1929, 1989 & 1995)
- Skin Game (1971)
- The Skin Game: (1921 & 1931)
- The Skin I Live In (2012)
- The Skin of Our Teeth (1959) (TV)
- Skin Trade (2014)
- Skin Traffik (2015)
- The Skin of the Wolf (2017)
- Skin: The Movie (2020)
- Skinamarink (2022)
- Skinned Deep (2004)
- Skinner (1993)
- Skinner's Baby (1917)
- Skinner's Dress Suit (1926)
- Skinning (2010)
- Skins: (2002 & 2017)
- Skinwalker (2021)
- Skinwalker Ranch (2013)
- Skinwalkers: (2002 & 2006)
- Skinny Tiger, Fatty Dragon (1990)
- Skipped Parts: (2001 & 2010)
- Skippy (1931)
- Skiptrace (2016)
- Skirts (1921)
- Skirts Ahoy! (1952)
- The Skull (1965)
- Skull Heads (2009)
- Skull: The Mask (2020)
- Skullduggery: (1970 & 1983)
- Skulle det dukke opp flere lik er det bare å ringe (1970)
- The Skulls (2000)
- The Skulls II (2002)
- The Skulls III (2004)
- Skum Rocks! (2013)
- Sky Captain and the World of Tomorrow (2004)
- Sky on Fire (2016)
- Sky High: (1922, 2003 & 2005)
- Sky Lovers (2002)
- Sky Riders (1976)
- The Sky's the Limit: (1938, 1943 & 1975 TV)
- The Skydivers (1963)
- Skyfall (2012)
- Skyjacked (1972)
- Skyline: (1931 & 2010)
- Skylines (2020)
- Skyman (2019)
- Skyscraper: (1928, 1996, 2011 & 2018)
- Skytturnar (1987)

=== Sl ===
- Slacker (1991)
- Slackers (2002)
- Slam: (1998 & 2018)
- Slam Dunk Ernest (1995)
- Slanted (2026)
- Slap Her... She's French (2002)
- Slap Shot (1977)
- Slapstick of Another Kind (1984)
- Slasher (2004 & 2007)
- Slaughter Disc (2005)
- Slaughter High (1986)
- The Slaughter Rule (2002)
- Slaughterhouse-Five (1972)
- Slaughterhouse Rulez (2018)
- Slaves of New York (1989)
- Slaxx (2020)
- SLC Punk! (1998)
- Sleep: (1964 & 2013)
- Sleep with Me (1994)
- Sleepaway Camp series:
  - Sleepaway Camp (1983)
  - Sleepaway Camp II: Unhappy Campers (1988)
  - Sleepaway Camp III: Teenage Wasteland (1989)
  - Sleepaway Camp IV: The Survivor (2012)
- Sleeper: (1973 & 2005)
- The Sleeper: (2000 TV & 2012)
- Sleepers (1996)
- Sleeping Beauties (1999)
- Sleeping Beauty: (1942, 1949, 1955, 1959, 1973, 1987 & 2011)
- The Sleeping Beauty (1930)
- Sleeping Bride (2000)
- The Sleeping Car Murders (1965)
- The Sleeping City (1950)
- The Sleeping Dictionary (2003)
- Sleeping Dogs: (1977, 1997 & 2024)
- Sleeping Dogs Lie: (2005 & 2006)
- Sleeping with the Enemy (1991)
- Sleeping Giant (2015)
- Sleeping with Other People (2015)
- The Sleeping Princess in Devil's Castle (1987)
- Sleepless: (1957, 2001 & 2017)
- Sleepless Night: (1960, 2010 & 2011)
- Sleepless Nights: (1933 & 2003)
- Sleepless Nights (2016)
- Sleepless in Seattle (1993)
- Sleepover (2004)
- Sleepstalker (1995)
- Sleepwalk (1986)
- Sleepwalk with Me (2012)
- Sleepwalkers (1992)
- Sleepwalking (2008)
- Sleepy Hollow (1999)
- Slender Man (2018)
- Sleuth: (1972 & 2007)
- Sliding Doors (1998)
- A Slight Case of Murder (1938)
- Slightly Scarlet (1956)
- Slim (1937)
- The Slime People (1963)
- Sling Blade (1996)
- Slink (2013)
- The Slipper and the Rose (1976)
- Slipping Wives (1927)
- A Slipping-Down Life (1999)
- Slipstream: (1967, 1973, 1989, 2005 & 2007)
- Slither: (1973 & 2006)
- Sliver (1993)
- Sloane (1984)
- The Sloth Lane (2024)
- Slovenian Girl (2009)
- Slow Burn: (1986, 2000 & 2005)
- The Slow Business of Going (2000)
- Slow Dancing in the Big City (1978)
- Slow West (2015)
- Sludge (2005)
- The Slugger's Wife (1985)
- Slugs (1988)
- Slugs (2004)
- Slugterra: Ghoul from Beyond (2014)
- Slugterra: Return of the Elementals (2014)
- Slum (2013)
- Slum Bala (2008)
- Slum Dog Husband (2023)
- The Slum Stars (2017)
- Slumber (2017)
- The Slumber Party (2023) (TV)
- Slumber Party '57 (1976)
- Slumber Party Massacre series:
  - The Slumber Party Massacre (1982)
  - Slumber Party Massacre II (1987)
  - Slumber Party Massacre III (1990)
  - Slumber Party Massacre (2021)
- Slumberland (2022)
- Slumdog Millionaire (2008)
- Slumlord Millionaire (2024)
- Slumming (2006)
- Slums of Berlin (1925)
- Slums of Beverly Hills (1998)
- Slunce, seno a pár facek (1989)
- Slunce, seno, erotika (1991)
- Slunce, seno, jahody (1983)
- The Slut (2011)
- Slut in a Good Way (2018)
- Sluttish (1961)
- Slutty Summer (20040
- Sly (2023)
- Sly Lives! (aka The Burden of Black Genius) (2025)

=== Sm ===
==== Sma ====
- Small Apartments (2012)
- The Small Back Room (1949)
- Small Blind (2012)
- Small Body (2021)
- Small Change (1976)
- Small Chops (2020)
- Small Claims (2004) (TV)
- Small Claims: White Wedding (2005) (TV)
- Small Claims: The Reunion (2006) (TV)
- Small Country: An African Childhood (2020)
- Small Crime (2008)
- Small Crimes (2017)
- Small Demon (1995)
- A Small Domain (1996)
- Small Engine Repair (2021)
- Small Faces (1996)
- Small Fry (2011)
- Small Gods (2017)
- Small Hotel (1957)
- The Small One (1978)
- Small Sacrifices (1989) (TV)
- Small Soldiers (1998)
- Small Talk: (1929 & 2016)
- Small Things like These (2024)
- Small Time: (1996 & 2014)
- Small Time Crooks (2000)
- Small Town Boy (1937)
- Small Town Conspiracy (2003)
- Small Town Crime (2017)
- Small Town Deb (1941)
- Small Town Gay Bar (2006)
- Small Town Girl: (1936 & 1953)
- A Small Town Girl (1914)
- Small Town Heroes (2022)
- Small Town Murder Songs (2010)
- Small Town Rivals (2007)
- Small Town Saturday Night (2010)
- Small Town Sheriff (1927)
- Small Town Sinners (1927)
- Small Town Story (1953)
- Small Town Wisconsin (2020)
- Small Voices (2002)
- Small Voices: The Stories of Cambodia's Children (2008)
- Small Wonders (1995)
- The Smallest Show on Earth (1957)
- Smallfoot (2018)
- Smart Alec: (1951 American & 1951 British)
- Smart House (1999 TV)
- Smart Money: (1931 & 1986)
- Smart People (2008)
- Smash Palace (1981)
- Smash-Up, the Story of a Woman (1947)
- Smashed (2012)
- The Smashing Machine (2025)

==== Sme–Smy ====
- Smell of Camphor, Scent of Jasmine (2000)
- Smell of Rain (2006)
- Smile: (1975, 2005 & 2022)
- Smile 2 (2024)
- Smile Before Death (1972)
- Smiles of a Summer Night (1955)
- Smiley: (1956 & 2012)
- Smiley Face (2007)
- Smilin' Through (1932)
- The Smiling Lieutenant (1931)
- Smilla's Sense of Snow (1997)
- Smithereens (1982)
- Smithy: (1924, 1933 & 1946)
- Smog (1962)
- Smoke (1995)
- Smoke 'Em If You Got 'Em (1988)
- Smoke Lightning (1933)
- Smoke and Mirrors (2016)
- Smoke on the Potato Fields (1977)
- Smoke Sauna Sisterhood (2023)
- Smoke Signal (1955)
- Smoke Signals (1998)
- The Smokers (2000)
- Smokey and the Bandit series:
  - Smokey and the Bandit (1977)
  - Smokey and the Bandit II (1980)
  - Smokey and the Bandit Part 3 (1983)
- Smokin' Aces (2007)
- Smokin' Aces 2: Assassins' Ball (2010)
- Smoking/No Smoking (1993)
- Smoky: (1933, 1946 & 1966)
- Smooth Talk (1985)
- Smosh: The Movie (2015)
- Smother (2008)
- Smothered (2016)
- Smudge (1922)
- Smudge the Blades (2026)
- Smuggled Cargo (1939)
- Smuggler (1996)
- The Smuggler (1911)
- The Smuggler's Bride of Mallorca (1929)
- The Smuggler's Cave (1915)
- Smuggler's Cove (1948)
- The Smuggler's Daughter (1914)
- Smuggler's Gold (1951)
- Smuggler's Island (1951)
- Smugglers (2023)
- The Smugglers (1916)
- The Smugglers (1958)
- The Smugglers (1967)
- Smugglers of Death (1959)
- The Smugglers of Santa Cruz (1916)
- The Smugglers' Banquet (1952)
- The Smurfs series:
  - The Smurfs and the Magic Flute (1976)
  - The Smurfs (2011)
  - The Smurfs: A Christmas Carol (2011)
  - The Smurfs 2 (2013)
  - The Smurfs: The Legend of Smurfy Hollow (2013)
  - Smurfs: The Lost Village (2017)
  - Smurfs (2025)
- Smyrna, My Beloved (2021)

=== Sn ===
==== Sna ====
- Snack Shack (2024)
- Snafu (1945)
- The Snail and the Whale (2019) (TV)
- Snails in the Rain (2013)
- Snake & Crane Arts of Shaolin (1978)
- Snake in the Eagle's Shadow (1978)
- Snake Eater (1989)
- Snake Eater II: The Drug Buster (1989)
- Snake Eater III: His Law (1992)
- Snake Eyes: (1998 & 2021)
- Snake Fang (1990)
- The Snake Girl and the Silver-Haired Witch (1968)
- Snake Island (2002)
- A Snake of June (2002)
- The Snake King (2005) (TV)
- The Snake King's Child (2001)
- Snake & Mongoose (2013)
- Snake in the Monkey's Shadow (1979)
- The Snake Pit (1948)
- Snake Spring (1997)
- Snake's Venom (1982)
- Snakehead (2021)
- Snakes and Ladders: (1965, 1980 & 1996)
- Snakes on a Plane (2006)
- Snakes on a Train (2006)
- Snakeskin (2001)
- Snapaka Yohannan (1963)
- Snapdragon (1993)
- The Snapper (1993)
- Snapshot (1979)
- Snapshot of a Crime (1975)
- Snapshots: (2002 & 2018)
- Snapshots for Henry (2006)
- Snapshots as Souvenirs (1976)
- Snares of Paris (1919)
- Snatch (2000)
- Snatched: (1973 & 2017)

==== Sne ====
- Sneakerella (2022)
- Sneakers: (1992 & 2011)
- Sneaks (2025)
- Sneeze Me Away (2010)
- Sneha (1999)
- Sneha Geetham (2010)
- Sneha Sedu (1978)
- Sneha Yamuna (1977)
- Snehada Kadalalli (1992)
- Snehadeepam (1962)
- Snehadeepame Mizhi Thurakku (1972)
- Snehaloka (1999)
- Sneham: (1977 & 1998)
- Sneham Kosam (1999)
- Sneham Oru Pravaaham (1981)
- Snehamante Idera (2001)
- Snehamulla Simham (1986)
- Snehana Preethina (2007)
- Snehapoorvam Anna (2000)
- Snehasagaram (1992)
- Snehaseema (1954)
- Snehathinte Mukhangal (1978)
- Snehaveedu (2011)
- Snehavin Kadhalarkal (2014)
- Snehicha Kuttathinu (1985)
- Snehikkan Oru Pennu (1978)
- Snehikkan Samayamilla (1978)
- Snehitara Savaal (1981)
- Snehitaru (2012)
- Snehithan (2002)
- Snehithulu (1998)
- Snehituda (2009)

==== Sni–Snu ====
- Snide and Prejudice (1997)
- Sniff (2017)
- Sniffles and the Bookworm (1939)
- Sniffles Takes a Trip (1940)
- Snip (2016)
- Sniper: (1931 & 2022)
- Sniper series:
  - Sniper (1993)
  - Sniper 2 (2002) (TV)
  - Sniper 3 (2004)
  - Sniper: Reloaded (2011)
  - Sniper: Legacy (2014)
  - Sniper: Ghost Shooter (2016)
  - Sniper: Ultimate Kill (2017)
  - Sniper: Assassin's End (2020)
- The Sniper: (1952 & 2009)
- Sniper Special Ops (2016)
- Sniper's Ridge (1961)
- Snipes (2001)
- Snitch (2013)
- Snobs (1915)
- Snoop Dogg's Doggystyle (2001)
- Snoop Dogg's Hood of Horror (2006)
- Snoopy Come Home (1972)
- The Snorkel (1958)
- Snow Angels (2008)
- Snow Blossom (2014)
- Snow Cake (2006)
- The Snow Creature (1954)
- Snow Day: (2000 & 2022)
- Snow Dogs (2002)
- Snow Falling on Cedars (1999)
- The Snow Queen: (1957, 1967, 1986, 1995 & 2005 TV)
- The Snow Queen series:
  - The Snow Queen (2012)
  - The Snow Queen 2 (2014)
  - The Snow Queen 3: Fire and Ice (2016)
  - The Snow Queen: Mirrorlands (2018)
- Snow White: (1902, 1916, 1952, 1961, 1987 & 2025)
- A Snow White Christmas (1980) (TV)
- Snow White and the Huntsman (2012)
- The Snow White Murder Case (2014)
- Snow White and the Seven Dwarfs: (1937 & 1955)
- Snow White and the Three Stooges (1961)
- Snow White: The Fairest of Them All (2001) (TV)
- Snow White: A Tale of Terror (1997)
- Snow-White (1933)
- Snowboard Academy (1997)
- Snowden (2016)
- The Snowdrop Festival (1984)
- The Snowman: (1982 TV & 2017)
- Snowman's Land (2010)
- Snowmen (2010)
- Snowpiercer (2013)
- The Snows of Kilimanjaro: (1952 & 2011)
- Snowtime! (2015)
- Snowtown (2011)
- Snuff (1976)

=== So ===
- So Big! (1932)
- So Close (2002)
- So Close to Paradise (1998)
- So Cute (2003)
- So Dark the Night (1946)
- So Dear to My Heart (1949)
- So Evil My Love (1948)
- So Goes My Love (1946)
- So I Married an Axe Murderer (1993)
- So Long at the Fair (1950)
- So Long, Stooge (1983)
- So Proudly We Hail! (1943)
- So Quiet on the Canine Front (1930)
- So Undercover (2012)
- So Young (2013)
- So's Your Old Man (1926)

==== Soa–Sol ====
- Soak the Rich (1936)
- Soaked in Bleach (2015)
- Soan Papdi (2015)
- Soap Bubbles (1906)
- Soap Girl (2002)
- Soap Life (2012)
- Soap Opera: (1964 & 2014)
- Soapdish (1991)
- Soappu Seeppu Kannadi (1968)
- Soapsuds and Sapheads (1919)
- Sob o Céu da Bahia (1956)
- Sob Sister (1931)
- Soba (2004)
- Sobar Upore Tumi (2009)
- Sober Driver (2019)
- Sobha (1958)
- Sobi's Mystic (2017)
- Sobibor (2018)
- Sobibor, October 14, 1943, 4 p.m. (2001)
- Sobral – O Homem que Não Tinha Preço (2013)
- Soccer Killer (2017)
- Soccer Mom (2008)
- Soch Lo (2010)
- Socha Na Tha (2005)
- Social Animals: (2018 comedy & 2018 documentary)
- Social Briars (1918)
- Social Decay (1932)
- The Social Dilemma (2020)
- Social Error (1935)
- Social Genocide (2004)
- Social Hygiene (2021)
- Social Hypocrites (1918)
- The Social Network (2010)
- The Social Reckoning (2026)
- Social Register (1934)
- Social Suicide (2015)
- Society (1989)
- Society Doctor (1935)
- Society Dog Show (1939)
- Society Fever (1935)
- Society Girl: (1932 & 1976)
- Society Lady (1978)
- Society Lawyer (1939)
- Society Mugs (1946)
- Society Murders (2006) (TV)
- Society for Sale (1918)
- Society Secrets (1921)
- Society Smugglers (1939)
- Society Snobs (1921)
- Society of the Snow (2023)
- Society's Driftwood (1917)
- Sock-a-Bye Baby (1942)
- Sock a Doodle Do (1952)
- Socket (2007)
- Socko in Morocco (1954)
- Socks and Cakes (2010)
- Socrates (1971)
- Sodom and Gomorrah: (1922 & 1962)
- Sofia's Last Ambulance (2012)
- The Soft Skin (1964)
- Soigne ta droite (1987)
- Solace (2006)
- Solarbabies (1986)
- Solaris: (1972 & 2002)
- Soldados de Salamina (2003)
- Soldier: (1998 USA & 1998 India)
- Soldier Blue (1970)
- Soldier of Fortune (1955)
- Soldier of Orange (1977)
- Soldier in the Rain (1963)
- A Soldier's Daughter Never Cries (1998)
- Soldier's Girl (2003)
- A Soldier's Prayer (1961)
- A Soldier's Story (1984)
- Soldiers of the Emperor (1918)
- Sole Sisters (2003)
- Sole Survivor: (1970 TV, 1984, 2000 TV & 2013)
- Soleil O (1970)
- The Solitaire Man (1933)
- Solitary Man (2010)
- Sollers Point (2017)
- Solo: (1977, 1996, 2006, 2008, 2011, 2013 & 2017)
- Solo Mio (2026)
- Solo: A Star Wars Story (2018)
- Sólo Con Tu Pareja (1991)
- The Soloist (2009)
- Solomon Kane (2009)
- Solomon and Sheba (1959)
- Solomon's Perjury (2015)
- Solos en la madrugada (1978)
- Solstice (2008)

==== Som ====
- Som du vill ha mej (1943)
- Som folk är mest (1944)
- Som sendt fra himlen (1951)
- Soma (1996)
- Sombre (1998)
- Sombrero (1953)
- Some (2004)
- Some Baby (1915)
- Some Beasts (2019)
- Some Birds Can't Fly (1997)
- Some Blondes Are Dangerous (1937)
- Some Boy! (1917)
- Some Bride (1919)
- Some Call It Loving (1973)
- Some Came Running (1958)
- Some Chaperone (1915)
- Some Dudes Can Fight (1898)
- Some Even Fall in Love (1980)
- Some Folks Call It a Sling Blade (1994)
- Some Fools There Were (1913)
- Some Freaks (2016)
- Some Girl (1998)
- Some Girl(s) (2013)
- Some Girls (1988)
- Some Girls Do (1969)
- Some Kind of Beautiful (2014)
- Some Kind of Hate (2015)
- Some Kind of Heaven (2020)
- Some Kind of Love (2015)
- Some Kind of Monster (2004)
- Some Kind of Wonderful (1987)
- Some Like It Hot: (1939, 1959 & 2016)
- Some Other Woman (2023)
- Somebody Up There Likes Me (1956)
- Someone Like You (2001)
- Someone Special (2004)
- Someone to Watch Over Me (1987)
- Somers Town (2008)
- Somersault (2004)
- Something in the Air: (2002 & 2012)
- Something Big (1971)
- Something Borrowed (2011)
- Something Different: (1920 & 1963)
- Something in the Dirt (2022)
- Something to Hide (1972)
- Something Like Happiness (2005)
- Something Like a War (1991)
- Something the Lord Made (2004) (TV)
- Something New (2006)
- Something Out of Nothing (1979)
- Something to Talk About (1995)
- Something Wicked (2014)
- Something Wicked This Way Comes (1983)
- Something Wild: (1961 & 1986)
- Something's Got to Give (1996)
- Something's Gotta Give (2003)
- Sometimes Always Never (2018)
- Sometimes Aunt Martha Does Dreadful Things (1971)
- Sometimes a Great Notion (1971)
- Sometimes They Come Back (1991) (TV)
- Sometimes They Come Back... Again (1996)
- Sometimes They Come Back... for More (1998)
- Somewhere (2010)
- Somewhere in the Night (1946)
- Somewhere Quiet (2023)
- Somewhere in Time (1980)
- Somm (2012)
- Somm 3 (2018)
- Somm: Into the Bottle (2015)
- Sommersby (1993)

==== Son ====
- Son: (1955, 2008 & 2021)
- The Son: (1953, 2002, 2019 Argentine, 2019 Bosnia and Herzegovina & 2022)
- Son of the Bride (2001)
- The Son of Captain Blood (1962)
- Son of Dracula: (1943 & 1974)
- Son of Flubber (1963)
- Son of Frankenstein (1939)
- Son of God (2014)
- Son of Godzilla (1967)
- Son of a Gun (2014)
- Son of Kong (1933)
- Son of Lassie (1945)
- Son in Law (1993)
- Son of Man: (1980 & 2006)
- A Son of Man (2018)
- Son of the Mask (2005)
- Son of Monarchs (2020)
- Son of Paleface (1952)
- Son of the Pink Panther (1993)
- Son of Rambow (2007)
- Son of Samson (1960)
- Son of Saul (2015)
- The Son of the Sheik (1926)
- Son of the White Mare (1981)
- The Son's Room (2001)
- The Sonata (2018)
- Sonatine: (1984 & 1993)
- The Song of Bernadette (1943)
- A Song Is Born (1948)
- Song of China (1936)
- Song of the Fishermen (1934)
- Song from the Forest (2013)
- Song of Freedom (1936)
- Song of Granite (2017)
- Song of Love: (1929 & 1947)
- Song at Midnight (1937)
- Song of Norway (1970)
- Song of Paris (1952)
- Song of the Phoenix (2013)
- Song for a Raggy Boy (2003)
- The Song Remains the Same (1976)
- Song of the Sea: (1952 & 2014)
- Song of the South (1946)
- Song Sung Blue (2025)
- Song of the Thin Man (1947)
- Song of the West (1930)
- Songbird: (2018 & 2020)
- Songcatcher (2000)
- Songs My Brothers Taught Me (2015)
- Songs from the Second Floor (2000)
- Songwriter (1984)
- Sonic the Hedgehog (2020)
- Sonic the Hedgehog 2 (2022)
- Sonic the Hedgehog 3 (2024)
- Sonic Zombie Doom Ship The Movie (2014)
- Sonnenallee (1999)
- Sonny: (1922 & 2002)
- Sonny Boy: (1929, 1989 & 2011)
- Sons: (1996 & 2006)
- Sons of the Clouds (2012)
- Sons and Daughters in a Time of Storm (1935)
- Sons of the Desert (1933)
- The Sons of Great Bear (1966)
- The Sons of Katie Elder (1965)
- Sons of the Neon Night (TBD)
- Sons of the Pioneers (1942)
- Sons of Provo (2004)
- Sons of Trinity (1995)

==== Soo ====
- Soo (2007)
- Soodhu Kavvum (2013)
- Soodhu Kavvum 2 (2024)
- Soof (2013)
- Soof 3 (2022)
- Soojidaara (2019)
- Sookshmadarshini (2024)
- Soolam (1980)
- Soole (2021)
- Sooner or Later (1920)
- Sooner or Later (1979)
- Sooper Se Ooper (2013)
- Soongava: Dance of the Orchids (2012)
- Soora (2008)
- Soora Samhaaram (1988)
- Sooragan (2023)
- Soorakottai Singakutti (1983)
- Sooran (2014)
- Soorappa (2000)
- Soorarai Pottru (2020)
- Soorat Aur Seerat (1962)
- Soorati (2003)
- Soori (2003)
- Sooriya Arana (2004)
- Sooriya Nagaram (2012)
- Soot and Gold (1945)
- Sooteh-Delan (1977)
- Soothradharan (2001)
- Soothrakkaari (1978)
- Soothrakkaran (2019)
- Soothravakyam (2025)

==== Sop–Soy ====
- Sophie Scholl – The Final Days (2005)
- Sophie's Choice (1982)
- Sorcerer (1977)
- The Sorcerer and the White Snake (2011)
- The Sorcerer's Apprentice: (1955, 1980 & 2010)
- The Sorcerers (1967)
- Sorceress: (1982 & 1995)
- Sordid Lives (2000)
- Sorority Babes in the Slimeball Bowl-O-Rama (1988)
- Sorority Boys (2002)
- Sorority House Massacre (1986)
- Sorority House Massacre II (1990)
- Sorority House Massacre III: Hard to Die (1990)
- Sorority Row (2009)
- Sorrell and Son: (1927 & 1934)
- The Sorrow of Mrs. Schneider (2008)
- The Sorrow and the Pity (1969)
- Sorrowful Jones (1949)
- Sorrows of the Forbidden City (1948)
- Sorry to Bother You (2018)
- Sorry We Missed You (2019)
- Sorry, Baby (2025)
- Sorry, I Love You (2014)
- Sorry, Wrong Number (1948)
- Sorum (2001)
- SOS Kolkata (2020)
- Sotsgorod: Cities for Utopia (1996)
- Soul: (2013 & 2020)
- The Soul (2021)
- Soul Food (1997)
- A Soul Haunted by Painting (1994)
- Soul Man (1986)
- Soul Mate: (2002 & 2016)
- Soul Plane (2004)
- Soul Surfer (2011)
- Soul Survivors (2001)
- Souli (2004)
- Soulkeeper (2001) (TV)
- Soulm8te (2026)
- Souls Protest (2000)
- Souls for Sale (1923)
- Souls at Sea (1937)
- Soumyam (2005)
- The Sound Barrier (1952)
- Sound City (2013)
- Sound of Freedom (2023)
- The Sound of Fury (1950)
- The Sound and the Fury: (1959 & 2014)
- Sound of Metal (2019)
- Sound of the Mountain (1954)
- The Sound of Music (1965)
- Sound of My Voice (2011)
- The Sound Story (2019)
- A Sound of Thunder (2005)
- Sounder (1972)
- Soundtrack to a Coup d'Etat (2024)
- Soup to Nuts (1930)
- Soup For One (1982)
- Sour Grapes: (1998 & 2016)
- The Source: (1918, 1999, 2002 & 2011)
- Source Code (2011)
- South of the Clouds: (2004 & 2014)
- South of Death Valley (1949)
- South of Dixie (1944)
- South of Heaven (2021)
- South of Heaven, West of Hell (2000)
- South Pacific: (1958 & 2001 TV)
- South of Pago Pago (1940)
- South of Panama: (1928 & 1941)
- South Park: Bigger, Longer & Uncut (1999)
- South of 8 (2016)
- South of Wawa (1991)
- Southern Baptist Sissies (2013)
- Southern Belles (2005)
- Southern Comfort: (1982 & 2001)
- Southern Fried Rabbit (1953)
- A Southern Maid (1933)
- The Southerner (1945)
- Southie (1998)
- Southland Tales (2006)
- Southlander (2003)
- Southpaw (2015)
- Southside 1-1000 (1950)
- Southside with You (2016)
- The Souvenir (2019)
- The Souvenir Part II (2021)
- Sovereign (2025)
- Soylent Green (1973)

=== Sp ===
==== Spa ====
- Spa (2026)
- Spa Night (2016)
- Spa Weekend (2026)
- Space Amoeba (1970)
- Space Battleship Yamato: (1977 & 2010)
- Space Battleship Yamato: Resurrection (2009)
- The Space Between Us (2016)
- Space Boy! Night, Neal and Ness (1973)
- Space Chimps (2008)
- Space Chimps 2: Zartog Strikes Back (2010)
- Space Cop (2016)
- Space Cowboys (2000)
- Space Jam (1996)
- Space Jam: A New Legacy (2021)
- Space Marines (1997)
- Space Men (1960)
- Space Mutiny (1988)
- Space Is the Place (1974)
- Space Raiders (1983)
- Space Station 3D (2002)
- Space Sweepers (2021)
- Space Truckers (1996)
- Space-Men (1960)
- Spaceballs (1987)
- SpaceCamp (1986)
- Spaced Invaders (1990)
- Spacehunter: Adventures in the Forbidden Zone (1983)
- Spaceman: (1997, 2016 & 2024)
- Spaceways (1953)
- Spanglish (2004)
- The Spanish Apartment (2002)
- The Spanish Main (1945)
- The Spanish Prisoner (1997)
- Spanking the Monkey (1994)
- Spark: (1998, 2014 & 2016)
- Spark: A Burning Man Story (2013)
- A Spark Story (2021)
- Sparkle: (1976, 2007 & 2012)
- Sparks (2013)
- The Sparks Brothers (2021)
- Sparrow: (1993, 2008 & 2010)
- The Sparrow: (1914 & 1972)
- Sparrows: (1916, 1926 & 2015)
- The Sparrows of Paris (1953)
- Spartacus (1960)
- Spartan (2004)
- Spawn (1997)

==== Spe–Spy ====
- Speak (2004)
- Speak to Me of Love (2002)
- Speak No Evil: (2013, 2022, & 2024)
- Speak Up! It's So Dark (1993)
- Speakeasy: (1929 & 2002)
- Special (2006)
- Special 26 (2013)
- Special Cop in Action (1976)
- Special Correspondents (2016)
- A Special Day (1977)
- Special Effects: Anything Can Happen (1996)
- A Special Sesame Street Christmas (1978) (TV)
- Special Section (1975)
- The Specialist: (1975 & 1994)
- The Specialists (1969)
- The Specials: (2000 & 2019)
- Species series:
  - Species (1995)
  - Species II (1998)
  - Species III (2004)
  - Species – The Awakening (2007)
- The Spectacular Now (2013)
- Spectral (2016)
- Speechless (1994 & 2012)
- Speed: (1936, 1984, 1994, 2007 & 2015)
- Speed 2: Cruise Control (1997)
- Speed Demon: (1932, 2003 & 2026)
- Speed Racer (2008)
- Speed Zone (1989)
- Speedway: (1929 & 1968)
- Speedway Junky (1999)
- Speedy (1928)
- Spell (2020)
- The Spell: (1977 TV & 2009)
- Spellbound: (1945 & 2002)
- Spellbreaker: Secret of the Leprechauns (1996)
- Spellcaster (1992)
- Spencer (2021)
- Spencer's Mountain (1963)
- The Spender: (1913 & 1919)
- The Sperm (2007)
- Sperm Whale (2015)
- Spenser Confidential (2020)
- Spetters (1980)
- Sphere (1998)
- Sphinx (1981)
- The Sphinx (1916)
- The Sphinx (1920)
- The Sphinx (1933)
- Spice World (1997)
- Spicy Hot in Love (2016)
- Spicy Love Soup (1997)
- The Spider: (1940 & 1945)
- Spider: (2002 & 2007)
- Spider Baby (1964)
- The Spider and the Butterfly (1909)
- The Spider and the Fly: (1931 & 1949)
- Spider Lilies (2007)
- The Spider Woman (1943)
- The Spider Woman Strikes Back (1946)
- Spider-Man series:
  - 3 Dev Adam (1973)
  - Spider-Man: (1977, 1979 TV & 2002)
  - Spider-Man 2 (2004)
  - Spider-Man 3 (2007)
  - The Amazing Spider-Man (2012)
  - The Amazing Spider-Man 2 (2014)
  - Spider-Man: Homecoming (2017)
  - Spider-Man: Into the Spider-Verse (2018)
  - Spider-Man: Far From Home (2019)
  - Spider-Man: No Way Home (2021)
  - Spider-Man: Across the Spider-Verse (2023)
  - Spider-Man: Brand New Day (2026)
  - Spider-Man: Beyond the Spider-Verse (2027)
- The Spider's Stratagem (1970)
- SpiderBabe (2003)
- Spiderhead (2022)
- The Spiders (1919)
- Spiders 3D (2013)
- The Spiderwick Chronicles (2008)
- The Spies: (1919 & 2012)
- Spies in Disguise (2019)
- Spies Like Us (1985)
- Spike (2008)
- Spike Island (2012)
- Spiklenci slasti (1996)
- Spin the Bottle: (1998 & 2003)
- Spin Me Round (2022)
- The Spine (2009)
- The Spine of Night (2021)
- Spinning Man (2018)
- Spinout (1966)
- Spione (1928)
- Spiral: (1978, 1998, 2007, 2014, 2019 & 2021)
- The Spiral Staircase: (1946, 1975 & 2000 TV)
- The Spirit (2008)
- The Spirit of the Beehive (1973)
- Spirit of the Forest (2008)
- The Spirit of Gallipoli (1928)
- Spirit Halloween: The Movie (2022)
- Spirit of Korean Celadon (2002)
- The Spirit of St. Louis (1957)
- The Spirit Is Willing (1967)
- Spirit Untamed (2021)
- Spirit of Youth (1938)
- The Spirit of Youth (1929)
- Spirit: Stallion of the Cimarron (2002)
- Spirited (2022)
- Spirited Away (2001)
- Spirits of the Dead (1968)
- Spirits’ Homecoming (2016)
- Spiritual Kung Fu (1978)
- Spiritwalker (2021)
- Spit (2025)
- S.P.I.T.: Squeegee Punks in Traffic (2001)
- The Spitfire Grill (1996)
- SPL: Sha Po Lang (2005)
- Splash (1984)
- Splendor: (1935, 1989 & 1999)
- Splendor in the Grass: (1961 & 1981 TV)
- Splice (2010)
- Splinter: (2006 & 2008)
- Splinters: (1929 & 2018)
- Splinters in the Air (1937)
- Splinters in the Navy (1931)
- The Split: (1959 & 1968)
- Split: (1989, 2016 American & 2016 South Korean)
- Split Image (1982)
- Split Second: (1953 & 1992)
- Splitsville (2025)
- Splitting Heirs (1993)
- Spoiler Alert (2023)
- The Spoilers: (1914, 1923, 1930, 1942 & 1955)
- SpongeBob SquarePants series:
  - The SpongeBob SquarePants Movie (2004)
  - The SpongeBob Movie: Sponge Out of Water (2015)
  - The SpongeBob Movie: Sponge on the Run (2020)
  - The SpongeBob Movie: Search for SquarePants (2025)
- Spontaneous (2020)
- The Spook Who Sat by the Door (1973)
- Spooked (2004)
- Spookies (1986)
- Spookley the Square Pumpkin (2004)
- Spooks: (1930 & 1953)
- Spooks Run Wild (1941)
- Spooks: The Greater Good (2015)
- Spooky Buddies (2011)
- Spooky House (2002)
- The Sporting Club (1971)
- Sports Day (1945)
- Spotlight (2015)
- The Spotlight (1927)
- Spotswood (1991)
- A Spray of Plum Blossoms (1931)
- Spread (2009)
- Spree (2020)
- Spring: (1969, 2014 & 2019)
- Spring Breakdown (2007)
- Spring Breakers (2013)
- Spring Fever: (1919, 1927, 1982 & 2009)
- Spring Forward (2000)
- Spring in Park Lane (1948)
- The Spring River Flows East (1947)
- Spring Silkworms (1933)
- Spring in a Small Town (1948)
- Spring Snow (2005)
- Spring Subway (2002)
- Spring, Summer, Fall, Winter... and Spring (2003)
- Springtime: (1920, 1929, 1947 & 2004)
- Springtime in a Small Town (2002)
- Sprung (1997)
- Spun (2002)
- Sputnik (2020)
- Spy: (2012 South Korean, 2012 Russian & 2015)
- The Spy in Black (1939)
- Spy Game (2001)
- Spy Games (1999)
- Spy Girl (2004)
- Spy Hard (1996)
- Spy Kids series:
  - Spy Kids (2001)
  - Spy Kids 2: The Island of Lost Dreams (2002)
  - Spy Kids 3-D: Game Over (2003)
  - Spy Kids: All the Time in the World (2011)
  - Spy Kids: Armageddon (2023)
- The Spy Next Door (2010)
- Spy School (2008)
- The Spy Who Came in from the Cold (1965)
- The Spy Who Dumped Me (2018)
- The Spy Who Loved Me (1977)
- The Spy: Undercover Operation (2013)
- Spymate (2003)

=== Sq–Ss ===
- Squad (2021)
- Squad Car (1960)
- Squad of Girls (2022)
- Squadron 992 (1940)
- Squadron of Flying Hussars (1980)
- Squadron of Honor (1938)
- Squadron Leader X (1943)
- Squadron No. 5 (1939)
- Squanto: A Warrior's Tale (1994)
- The Square: (1994, 2008, 2013 & 2017)
- Square Crooks (1928)
- Square Dance (1987)
- Square Dance Jubilee (1949)
- Square Dance Katy (1950)
- Square Deal Sanderson (1919)
- Square Grouper: The Godfathers of Ganja (2011)
- Square Joe (1922)
- The Square Jungle (1955)
- Square One (1997)
- Square One: Michael Jackson (2019)
- Square Shooter (1935)
- Square Shoulders (1929)
- Square of Violence (1961)
- Squareheads of the Round Table (1948)
- Squash (2002)
- Squat (2017)
- Squatter's Delight (1990)
- Squatter's Rights (1946)
- Squatters (2014)
- The Squaw Man: (1914, 1918 & 1931)
- The Squawkin' Hawk (1942)
- The Squeaker: (1930, 1931, 1937 & 1963)
- Squealer (2023)
- Squeeze: (1980 & 1997)
- Squeeze a Flower (1970)
- Squeeze Play! (1979)
- Squeezed (2007)
- Squibs: (1921 & 1935)
- Squibs M.P. (1923)
- The Squid and the Whale (2005)
- Squirm (1976)
- Squizzy Taylor (1982)
- Srabon Megher Din (1999)
- Sraboner Dhara (2020)
- Sradha (2000)
- Sravanamasam (2005)
- Sravanthi (1985)
- Sredni Vashtar (1981)
- SS Experiment Camp (1976)
- Ssaki (1962)
- Sssssss (1973)

=== St ===
- St. Elmo: (1910 Thanhouser, 1910 Vitagraph, 1914, 1923 American & 1923 British)
- St. Elmo's Fire (1985)
- St. George Shoots the Dragon (2009)
- St. Ives: (1976 & 1998 TV)
- St. Louis Blues: (1929, 1939 & 1958)
- St. Patrick: The Irish Legend (2000) (TV)
- St. Peter's Umbrella: (1917, 1935 & 1958)
- St. Trinian's (2007)
- The St. Valentine's Day Massacre (1967)
- St. Vincent (2014)

==== Sta ====
- Sta Muhabbat Me Zindagi Da (2017)
- Stable Companions (1922)
- Stablemates (1938)
- Stacey (1973)
- Stacked (2008)
- Stacking (1987)
- Stacy: Attack of the Schoolgirl Zombies (2001)
- Stacy's Knights (1983)
- Stadium (1934)
- Stag (1997)
- The Stag (2013)
- Stag Night (2008)
- Stag Night of the Dead (2010)
- Stage (1951)
- Stage Beauty (2004)
- Stage to Blue River (1951)
- Stage to Chino (1940)
- Stage Door (1937)
- Stage Door Canteen (1943)
- Stage Door Cartoon (1944)
- Stage Entrance (1956)
- Stage Fright: (1923, 1940, 1950, 1987, 1989, 1997 & 2014)
- Stage Kisses (1927)
- Stage Left (2011)
- Stage Madness (1927)
- Stage to Mesa City (1947)
- Stage Mother (1933)
- Stage Mother (2020)
- Stage Struck (1911)
- Stage Struck (1917)
- Stage Struck (1925)
- Stage Struck (1936)
- Stage Struck (1948)
- Stage Struck (1958)
- Stage to Thunder Rock (1964)
- Stage to Tucson (1950)
- Stagecoach: (1939, 1966 & 1986)
- Stagecoach Buckaroo (1942)
- Stagecoach of the Condemned (1970)
- Stagecoach to Dancers' Rock (1962)
- Stagecoach Days (1938)
- Stagecoach to Denver (1946)
- Stagecoach Driver (1951)
- Stagecoach Express (1942)
- Stagecoach to Fury (1956)
- Stagecoach Kid (1949)
- Stagecoach to Monterey (1944)
- Stagecoach: The Texas Jack Story (2016)
- Stagecoach War (1940)
- Stage-Struck Tora-san (1978)
- Staggered (1994)
- StagKnight (2005)
- Stain (2021)
- Stain in the Snow (1954)
- Staircase (1969)
- Stairs of Sand (1929)
- Stairway to Heaven (1946)
- Stairway to Light (1945)
- Stake Land (2011)
- Stakeout: (1958 & 1987)
- Stalag 17 (1953)
- Stalingrad: (1943, 1990, 1993 & 2013)
- Stalker: (1979, 2010, 2012 & 2016)
- The Stalking of Laurie Show (2000) (TV)
- The Stalking Moon (1968)
- The Stalls of Barchester (1971) (TV)
- Stan Helsing (2009)
- Stan and Ollie (2018)
- The Stand (1994)
- Stand and Deliver (1988)
- Stand by Me (1986)
- Stand Up and Cheer! (1934)
- Stand Up Guys (2013)
- Stand Up, Virgin Soldiers (1977)
- Stander (2003)
- Standing in the Shadows of Motown (2002)
- Standing Tall (2015)
- Standoff (2016)
- The Stanford Prison Experiment (2015)
- Stanley & Iris (1990)
- Stanley Kubrick: A Life in Pictures (2001)
- Star: (1982, 2001, 2014 & 2015)
- The Star: (1952, 1953, 2002 & 2017)
- Star! (1968)
- Star 80 (1983)
- The Star of Bethlehem: (1912 & 2007)
- A Star is Born: (1937, 1954, 1976 & 2018)
- The Star Chamber (1983)
- The Star Maker: (1939 & 1995)
- The Star Packer (1934)
- Star Theatre (1901)
- Star Trek series:
  - Star Trek: The Motion Picture (1979)
  - Star Trek II: The Wrath of Khan (1982)
  - Star Trek III: The Search for Spock (1984)
  - Star Trek IV: The Voyage Home (1986)
  - Star Trek V: The Final Frontier (1989)
  - Star Trek VI: The Undiscovered Country (1991)
  - Star Trek Generations (1994)
  - Star Trek: First Contact (1996)
  - Star Trek: Insurrection (1998)
  - Star Trek: Nemesis (2002)
  - Star Trek (2009)
  - Star Trek Into Darkness (2013)
  - Star Trek Beyond (2016)
- Star Vehicle (2010)
- Star Wars series:
  - Star Wars Episode IV: A New Hope (1977)
  - Star Wars Holiday Special (1978)
  - Star Wars Episode V: The Empire Strikes Back (1980)
  - Star Wars Episode VI: Return of the Jedi (1983)
  - Star Wars: Episode I – The Phantom Menace (1999)
  - Star Wars: Episode II – Attack of the Clones (2002)
  - Star Wars: Episode III – Revenge of the Sith (2005)
  - Star Wars: The Clone Wars (2008)
  - Star Wars: The Force Awakens (2015)
  - Star Wars: The Last Jedi (2017)
  - Star Wars: The Rise of Skywalker (2019)
- Star Wars Kid (2002)
- Star Wars: Revelations (2005)
- Star Wreck: In the Pirkinning (2005)
- Starbright (2026)
- Starchaser: The Legend of Orin (1985)
- Starcrash (1978)
- Stardom (2000)
- Stardust: (1974, 2007 & 2020)
- Stardust Memories (1980)
- The Starfighters (1964)
- Stargate (1994)
- Stargirl (2020)
- Starkweather (2004)
- Starless Dreams (2016)
- Starlet (2012)
- The Starling (2021)
- The Starling Girl (2023)
- Starman (1984)
- Starred Up (2013)
- Starry Eyes (2014)
- The Stars Fell on Henrietta (1995)
- The Stars Look Down (1940)
- Stars at Noon (2022)
- Starship Troopers series:
  - Starship Troopers (1997)
  - Starship Troopers 2: Hero of the Federation (2004)
  - Starship Troopers 3: Marauder (2008)
  - Starship Troopers: Invasion (2012)
  - Starship Troopers: Traitor of Mars (2017)
- Starship: Apocalypse (2014)
- Starship: Rising (2014)
- Starsky & Hutch (2004)
- Starstruck: (1982, 1998 & 2010 TV)
- Start the Revolution Without Me (1970)
- Starter for 10 (2006)
- Starting Over: (1979 & 2007)
- Startup.com (2001)
- Starve (2014)
- State Fair: (1933, 1945 & 1962)
- State of Grace (1990)
- State and Main (2000)
- A State of Mind (2004)
- State of Play (2009)
- State Property (2002)
- State of Siege (1972)
- State of Siege: Temple Attack (2021)
- State of the Union (1948)
- The Statement (2003)
- Staten Island (2009)
- Staten Island Summer (2015)
- The Station Agent (2003)
- Station Six-Sahara (1962)
- Stations of the Cross (2014)
- Stauffenberg (2004) (TV)
- Stavisky (1974)
- Stay: (2005 & 2013)
- Stay Alive (2006)
- Stay Away, Joe (1968)
- Stay Hungry (1976)
- Stay the Night (1992) (TV)
- Stay Tuned (1992)
- Staying Alive: (1983 & 2012)

==== Ste–Sto ====
- Steal This Movie! (2000)
- Stealing Beauty (1996)
- Stealing Harvard (2002)
- Stealing Home (1988)
- Stealing Pulp Fiction (2024)
- Stealing Rembrandt (2003)
- Stealth (2005)
- Steamboat Bill, Jr. (1928)
- Steamboat Willie (1928)
- Steamboy (2004)
- The Steamroller and the Violin (1960)
- Steel: (1933, 1979, 1997 & 2012)
- The Steel Claw (1961)
- Steel Dawn (1987)
- The Steel Helmet (1951)
- Steel and Lace (1991)
- Steel Magnolias (1989)
- Steele Justice (1987)
- Steep (2007)
- Stefanie (1958)
- Stefanie in Rio (1960)
- Stella: (1921, 1943, 1950, 1955, 1990 & 2008)
- Stella Dallas: (1925 & 1937)
- Stella Maris: (1918 & 1925)
- The Stendhal Syndrome (1996)
- Step Brothers (2008)
- Step Into Liquid (2003)
- Step Up series:
  - Step Up (2006)
  - Step Up 2: The Streets (2008)
  - Step Up 3D (2010)
  - Step Up Revolution (2012)
  - Step Up: All In (2014)
- The Stepfather: (1987 & 2009)
- Stepfather II (1989)
- Stepfather III (1992)
- Stepfather (2026)
- The Stepford Wives: (1975 & 2004)
- Stephanie (2017)
- Stephanie Daley (2006)
- Stepmom: (1973 & 1998)
- Stepsister from Planet Weird (2000) (TV)
- Steptoe and Son (1972)
- Stereo: (1969 & 2014)
- The Sterile Cuckoo (1969)
- The Sterling Chase (1999)
- Steve Jobs (2015)
- Stevie (2002)
- Stewardess School (1986)
- Stewie Griffin: The Untold Story (2005)
- Stick It (2006)
- The Sticky Fingers of Time (1997)
- Stigma: (1972, 1977 TV & 2013)
- Stigmata (1999)
- Still (2014)
- Still/Born (2017)
- Still Alice (2014)
- Still Breathing (1997)
- Still Crazy (1998)
- Still Life: (1974 & 2006)
- Still: A Michael J. Fox Movie (2023)
- Still of the Night (1982)
- Still Smokin (1983)
- Still Walking (2008)
- Stillwater (2021)
- Sting (2024)
- The Sting (1973)
- Sting of Death (1966)
- Sting of the West (1972)
- Stingray Sam (2009)
- Stir Crazy (1980)
- Stir of Echoes (1999)
- Stir of Echoes: The Homecoming (2007) (TV)
- Stitch! The Movie (2003)
- Stitches (2012)
- Stockholm (2018)
- Stoic (2009)
- Stoker (2013)
- The Stoker: (1932 & 1935)
- Stolen: (2009 documentary, 2009 drama & 2012)
- Stolen Desire (1958)
- Stolen Honor (2004)
- Stolen Kisses (1968)
- A Stolen Life (1946)
- Stolen Moments (1920)
- Stolen Summer (2002)
- The Stolen Years: (1998 & 2013)
- Stomp the Yard (2007)
- Stone: (1974, 2010 & 2012)
- The Stone (2013)
- Stone Cold: (1991 & 2005 TV)
- Stone Cold Fox (2025)
- The Stone Flower: (1946 & 1977)
- The Stone Roses: Made of Stone (2013)
- The Stoned Age (1994)
- The Stoneman Murders (2009)
- Stonewall: (1995 & 2015)
- Stonewall Uprising (2010)
- The Stoning of Soraya M. (2009)
- The Stooge (1953)
- Stool Pigeon (1928)
- The Stool Pigeon: (1915 & 2010)
- "#StopOnYou" (2021)
- Stop Making Sense (1984)
- Stop! Or My Mom Will Shoot (1992)
- Stop-Loss (2008)
- Stop-Zemlia (2021)
- The Stork Club (1945)
- The Stork Pays Off (1941)
- Storks (2016)
- Storm: (1987, 1999, 2005 & 2009)
- The Storm: (1916, 1922, 1930, 1933, 1938 & 2009)
- Storm Boy: (1976 & 2019)
- Storm Catcher (1999)
- Storm of the Century (1999) (TV)
- Storm Fear (1955)
- Storm over Asia: (1928 & 1938)
- Storm Rider (1972)
- The Storm Riders (1998)
- Storm Warning: (1951 & 2007)
- Stormbreaker (2006)
- Storms of Passion (1932)
- Stormy Monday (1988)
- The Stormy Night: (1925 & 2015)
- Stormy Weather: (1935, 1943 & 2003)
- Stormy Weathers (1992) (TV)
- The Story of Adele H. (1975)
- Story of a Bad Woman (1948)
- A Story from Chikamatsu (1954)
- Story of a Cloistered Nun (1973)
- The Story of David (1976) (TV)
- Story of Drunken Master (1979)
- The Story of Film: An Odyssey (2011) (TV)
- A Story of Floating Weeds (1934)
- The Story of G.I. Joe (1945)
- The Story of Jacob and Joseph (1974) (TV)
- The Story of Joseph and His Brethren (1962)
- The Story of the Kelly Gang (1906)
- The Story of the Last Chrysanthemum (1939)
- The Story of Louis Pasteur (1936)
- Story of a Love Affair (1950)
- Story of a Love Story (1973)
- The Story of Mankind (1957)
- The Story of Marie and Julien (2003)
- Story of My Death (2013)
- The Story of My Life (2004)
- The Story of My Wife (2021)
- Story of O (1975)
- Story of O - Chapter 2 (1984)
- Story of a Prostitute (1965)
- The Story of Qiu Ju (1992)
- The Story of Sin (1975)
- Story in Taipei (2017)
- The Story of Temple Drake (1933)
- The Story of Three Loves (1953)
- The Story of a Three-Day Pass (1967)
- Story Time (1979)
- The Story of Us (1999)
- The Story of Vernon and Irene Castle (1939)
- The Story of the Weeping Camel (2003)
- Story of the White-Haired Demon Girl (1959)
- Story of Women (1988)
- The Story of Woo Viet (1981)
- Story of a Young Couple (1952)
- Storytelling (2001)
- Stowaway: (1932, 1936, 1978, 2001 & 2021)

==== Str ====
- La strada (1954)
- Straight: (2007 & 2009)
- Straight to Hell (1987)
- Straight Out of Brooklyn (1991)
- Straight Outta Compton (2015)
- Straight Outta Nowhere: Scooby-Doo! Meets Courage the Cowardly Dog (2021)
- Straight Shooter (1999)
- The Straight Story (1999)
- Straight Talk (1992)
- Straight Time (1978)
- Straight Up: (1988 & 2019)
- Straight, Place and Show (1938)
- Straight-Jacket (2004)
- Straightheads (2007)
- Strait-Jacket (1964)
- Strange Bedfellows: (1965 & 2004)
- Strange Behavior (1981)
- Strange Brew (1983)
- The Strange Case of Angelica (2010)
- The Strange Case of Dr. Jekyll and Miss Osbourne (1981)
- The Strange Case of Dr. Jekyll and Mr. Hyde: (1968 TV & 2006)
- The Strange Colour of Your Body's Tears (2013)
- The Strange Countess (1961)
- Strange Darling (2023)
- Strange Days (1995)
- The Strange Death of Adolf Hitler (1943)
- The Strange Door (1951)
- Strange Harvest (2024)
- The Strange House (2015)
- Strange Interlude (1932)
- Strange Invaders (1983)
- The Strange Love of Martha Ivers (1946)
- Strange Magic (2015)
- Strange Nature (2018)
- Strange Parallel (1998)
- The Strange Thing About the Johnsons (2011)
- Strange but True (2019)
- The Strange Vice of Mrs. Wardh (1971)
- Strange Way of Life (2008)
- Strange Weather (2016)
- Strange Wilderness (2008)
- Strange World (2022)
- The Strange World of Coffin Joe (1968)
- The Strange World of Planet X (1958)
- Strangeland (1998)
- Stranger (2015)
- The Stranger: (1910, 1918, 1920, 1924, 1931, 1946, 1967, 1973 TV, 1984, 1987, 1995, 2000, 2010, 2012, 2014, 2021 & 2022)
- A Stranger Among Us (1992)
- Stranger in the House: (1967 & 1992)
- Stranger Inside (2001)
- Stranger on the Run (1967) (TV)
- Stranger Than Fiction (2006)
- Stranger Than Paradise (1984)
- Stranger on the Third Floor (1940)
- Stranger in Town: (1931 & 1957)
- A Stranger in Town: (1943 & 1967)
- The Stranger's Return (1933)
- Strangers: (1992 & 2007)
- The Strangers (2008)
- Strangers with Candy (2006)
- The Strangers in the House (1942)
- The Strangers: Prey at Night (2018)
- Strangers on a Train (1951)
- Strangers: The Story of a Mother and Daughter (1979)
- Strangler vs. Strangler (1984)
- Strategic Air Command (1955)
- Stratosphere Girl (2004)
- Stratton (2017)
- The Stratton Story (1949)
- Straw Dogs: (1971 & 2011)
- The Strawberry Blonde (1941)
- Strawberry and Chocolate (1994)
- Strawberry Fields: (1997, 2006 & 2011)
- Strawberry Mansion (2021)
- Strawberry Shortcake series:
  - Strawberry Shortcake: The Sweet Dreams Movie (2005)
  - Strawberry Shortcake: Berry Blossom Festival (2007)
  - Strawberry Shortcake: Let's Dance (2007)
  - Strawberry Shortcake: Rockaberry Roll (2008)
  - The Strawberry Shortcake Movie: Sky's the Limit (2009)
- The Strawberry Statement (1970)
- A Stray (2016)
- The Stray (2017)
- Stray Bullets (2016)
- Stray Dog (1949)
- Stray Dogs: (1989, 2004, 2013 & 2014)
- A Stray Goat (2016)
- StrayDog: Kerberos Panzer Cops (1991)
- Strays (2023)
- The Strays (2023)
- Stream (2024)
- Streamers (1983)
- Street Angel: (1928 & 1937)
- A Street Cat Named Bob (2016)
- Street of Chance: (1930 & 1942)
- Street Fight (2005)
- Street Fighter series:
  - Street Fighter II: The Animated Movie (1994)
  - Street Fighter (1994) & (2026)
  - Street Fighter Alpha: The Animation (2000)
  - Street Fighter Alpha: Generations (2005)
  - Street Fighter IV: The Ties That Bind (2009)
  - Street Fighter: The Legend of Chun-Li (2009)
  - Street Fighter: Round One: Fight (2011)
- The Street Fighter (1974)
- Street Gang: How We Got to Sesame Street (2021)
- Street Kings (2008)
- The Street with No Name (1948)
- Street Scene (1931)
- Street Scenes (1970)
- Street of Shadows: (1937 & 1953)
- Street of Shame (1959)
- Street Trash (1987)
- A Streetcar Named Desire: (1951, 1984 TV & 1995 TV)
- Streets of Fire (1984)
- Streets of San Francisco (1949)
- Streetwise: (1984 & 1998)
- La strega in amore (1966)
- Stretch: (2011 & 2014)
- Stricken (2009)
- Strictly Ballroom (1992)
- Strictly Business (1991)
- Strictly Confidential: (1959 & 2024)
- Strike It Rich (1990)
- Strike! (1925)
- Striking Distance (1993)
- Strip Search (2004) (TV)
- Stripes (1981)
- Stripped (2018)
- Striptease (1996)
- A Stroke of 1000 Millions (1966)
- Stroker Ace (1983)
- Stromboli (1950)
- The Strong Man (1926)
- Stronger (2017)
- The Strongest Man in the World (1975)
- Stroszek (1977)
- Struck by Lightning: (1990 & 2012)
- Struggle: (2003 & 2013)
- The Struggle: (1931 & 1977)
- The Struggle Everlasting (1918)
- Stryker: (1983 & 2004)

==== Stu–Sty ====
- Stuart Little series:
  - Stuart Little (1999)
  - Stuart Little 2 (2002)
  - Stuart Little 3: Call of the Wild (2005)
- Stuart Saves His Family (1995)
- Stubble Trouble (2001)
- Stubborn as a Mule (2010)
- Stuber (2019)
- Stuck: (2001, 2002, 2007 & 2017)
- Stuck Apart (2021)
- Stuck Between Stations (2011)
- Stuck in Love (2013)
- Stuck in the Suburbs (2004) (TV)
- Stuck on You (2003)
- Stuck on You! (1983)
- Student (2012)
- The Student: (2011 & 2016)
- Student of the Bedroom (1970)
- Student Bodies (1981)
- Student No.1 (2001)
- Student Number 1 (2003)
- The Student of Prague: (1913, 1926 & 1935)
- The Student Prince (1954)
- The Student Prince in Old Heidelberg (1927)
- Student of the Year (2012)
- Student of the Year 2 (2019)
- Student's Hotel (1932)
- Student Senate: A Documentary (2006)
- A Student's Song of Heidelberg (1930)
- The Students of Springfield Street (2015)
- Studio 54 (2018)
- Studio 666 (2022)
- Studujeme za školou (1939)
- Study (2012)
- A Study in Choreography for Camera (1945)
- A Study in Reds (1932)
- A Study in Scarlet: (1914 American, 1914 British & 1933)
- A Study in Terror (1965)
- The Stuff (1985)
- Stuff and Dough (2001)
- Stung: (1931 & 2015)
- The Stunt Man (1980)
- Stunt Rock (1978)
- Stunts (1977)
- Stunts Unlimited (1980)
- Stupid Boy (2004)
- Stupid, But Brave (1924)
- Stupid Teenagers Must Die! (2006)
- Stupid Young Heart (2018)
- Stupidity (2003)
- The Stupids (1996)
- Sturmtruppen (1976)
- Stutterer (2015)
- Style: (2001, 2002, 2004, 2006 & 2016)
- Style King (2016)
- Styx (2018)

=== Su ===
- Su adorable majadero (1938)
- Su esposa diurna (1944)
- Su From So (2025)
- Su hermana menor (1943)
- Su íntimo secreto (1948)
- Su nombre es Fujimori (2016)
- Su Su Sudhi Vathmeekam (2015)

==== Sua–Sum ====
- Suarez: The Healing Priest (2020)
- Suatu Ketika (2019)
- Subconscious Cruelty (2000)
- The Subject Was Roses (1968)
- Sublet (2020)
- Sublime (2007)
- Sublime (2022)
- Submarine: (1928 & 2010)
- Submerged: (2000 & 2005)
- Subramaniapuram (2008)
- Subspecies series:
  - Subspecies (1991)
  - Bloodstone: Subspecies II (1993)
  - Bloodlust: Subspecies III (1994)
  - Subspecies 4: Bloodstorm (1998)
- The Substance (2024)
- Substitute (2007)
- The Substitute: (1993 TV, 1996, 2007 & 2015)
- The Substitute 2: School's Out (1998)
- The Substitute 3: Winner Takes All (1999)
- The Substitute 4: Failure Is Not an Option (2001)
- Suburban Birds (2018)
- Suburban Commando (1991)
- Suburban Girl (2007)
- Suburban Gothic (2014)
- Suburban Mayhem (2006)
- Suburban Secrets (2004)
- The Suburbans (1999)
- Suburbia (1984)
- SubUrbia (1996)
- Suburbicon (2017)
- Subway (1985)
- Success: (1923, 1984, 1991 & 2003)
- Successive Slidings of Pleasure (1974)
- Succubus (1968)
- Such Good Friends (1971)
- Such a Long Journey (1998)
- Sucker Punch: (2008 & 2011)
- The Suckers (1972)
- Sudan (1945)
- Sudden Death: (1977 & 1995)
- Sudden Fear (1952)
- Sudden Impact (1983)
- Suddenly: (1954, 1996 TV & 2006)
- Suddenly 30 (2004)
- Suddenly at Midnight (1981)
- Suddenly Seventeen (2016)
- Suddenly, Last Summer (1959)
- Sue, Mai & Sawa: Righting the Girl Ship (2012)
- Suez (1938)
- The Suffering (2016)
- Suffering Man's Charity (2006)
- Sugar: (2004 & 2008)
- Sugar & Spice (2001)
- Sugar Cane Alley (1983)
- Sugar Daddies (1927)
- Sugar Mountain (2016)
- Sugar Hill: (1974 & 1994)
- Sugar Town (1999)
- The Sugarland Express (1974)
- Suhruthu (1952)
- Sugata Sanshirō (1943)
- Sügisball (2007)
- Suicide Club (2001)
- The Suicide Club: (1914 & 2000)
- Suicide Kings (1997)
- Suicide Manual (2003)
- Suicide Squad (1935)
- Suicide Squad series:
  - Suicide Squad (2016)
  - The Suicide Squad (2021)
  - Suicide Squad: Hell to Pay (2018)
- Suikoden Demon Century (1993)
- Suitable Flesh (2023)
- Sujata (1959)
- Sukimasuki (2015)
- Suki ni Naru Sono Shunkan o: Kokuhaku Jikkō Iinkai (2016)
- Sukiyaki Western Django (2007)
- Sullivan's Travels (1941)
- Sully (2016)
- The Sum of All Fears (2002)
- The Sum of Us (1995)
- Summer (1986)
- Summer of '42 (1971)
- Summer of 69 (2025)
- Summer of 84 (2018)
- Summer of 85 (2020)
- Summer 1993 (2017)
- Summer of Blood (2014)
- A Summer in the Cage (2007)
- Summer Camp Nightmare (1987)
- Summer Catch (2001)
- Summer Days with Coo (2007)
- Summer Days, Summer Nights (2018)
- A Summer in Genoa (2008)
- Summer Ghost (2021)
- Summer Heat: (1968, 1987, 2006 & 2008)
- Summer Hours (2008)
- Summer Interlude (1951)
- Summer Love Love (2011)
- Summer Lovers (1982)
- Summer Magic (1963)
- Summer with Monika (1953)
- Summer Night: (1986 & 2019)
- Summer Palace (2006)
- A Summer Place (1959)
- Summer Rental (1985)
- Summer of Sam (1999)
- Summer School: (1987 & 2006)
- Summer and Smoke (1961)
- Summer Snow (1995)
- Summer Solstice: (1981 TV & 2005 TV)
- Summer of Soul (...Or, When the Revolution Could Not Be Televised) (2021)
- Summer Stock (1950)
- Summer Storm: (1944 & 2004)
- Summer Time Machine Blues (2005)
- Summer's Desire (2016)
- A Summer's Tale (1996)
- Summertime: (1955, 2001, 2015, 2016 & 2020)
- The Summit of the Gods (2021)
- Sumo Do, Sumo Don't (1992)

==== Sun–Suz ====
- The Sun (2005)
- The Sun Also Rises: (1957, 1984 TV & 2007)
- Sun Dogs (2017)
- Sun Don't Shine (2012)
- Sun in the Last Days of the Shogunate (1957)
- The Sun in a Net (1963)
- The Sun Shines Bright (1953)
- Sun Valley (1996)
- Sun Valley Serenade (1941)
- Sunday: (1997 & 2008)
- Sunday Bloody Sunday (1971)
- A Sunday in the Country (1984)
- Sunday Drive (1986) (TV)
- Sunday in New York (1963)
- Sunday Too Far Away (1975)
- Sundown: (1924, 1941, 2016 & 2021)
- Sundown: The Vampire in Retreat (1989)
- The Sundowner: (1911 & 2010)
- The Sundowners: (1950 & 1960)
- Sunflower: (2005 & 2006)
- Sung horn (2003)
- Sunless (1983)
- Sunny: (1930, 1941 & 2008)
- The Sunny South or The Whirlwind of Fate (1915)
- Sunnyside (1919)
- Sunrise: (1926, 2014 & 2024)
- Sunrise at Campobello (1960)
- Sunrise: A Song of Two Humans (1927)
- Sunset: (1988 & 2018)
- Sunset Boulevard (1950)
- Sunset Song (2015)
- Sunset in the West (1950)
- The Sunset Limited (2011)
- Sunshine: (1999 & 2007)
- The Sunshine Boys: (1975 & 1996 TV)
- Sunshine Cleaning (2009)
- The Sunshine Makers (1935)
- Sunshine State (2002)
- Super: (2005, 2010 American & 2010 Indian)
- The Super: (1991 & 2017)
- Super 8 (2011)
- Super Bitch (1973)
- Super Bodyguard (2016)
- The Super Cops (1974)
- Super Dark Times (2017)
- The Super Dimension Fortress Macross: Do You Remember Love? (1984)
- Super Express (2016)
- The Super Fight (1970)
- Super Fly (1972)
- Super Fly T.N.T. (1973)
- Super Mario Bros. (1993)
- The Super Mario Bros. Movie (2023)
- Super Mario Bros.: The Great Mission to Rescue Princess Peach! (1986)
- The Super Mario Galaxy Movie (2026)
- Super Size Me (2004)
- Super Size Me 2: Holy Chicken! (2017)
- Super Speedway (1997)
- Super Sweet 16: The Movie (2007) (TV)
- Super Troopers (2002)
- Super Troopers 2 (2018)
- Super Troopers 3 (2026)
- Super-Rabbit (1943)
- Superbabies: Baby Geniuses 2 (2004)
- Superbad (2007)
- Superbeast (1972)
- Supercop (1996)
- Supercross (2005)
- Superfly (2018)
- Supergirl: (1973, 1984 & 2026)
- Superhero Movie (2008)
- Superior (2021)
- Superjews (2013)
- Superlópez: (2003 & 2018)
- Superman series:
  - Superman (1941, 1948 film serial, 1978, 1980, 1987 & 2025)
  - Superman and the Mole Men (1951)
  - Superman II (1980)
  - Superman III (1983)
  - Superman IV: The Quest for Peace (1987)
  - Superman: Brainiac Attacks (2006)
  - Superman Returns (2006)
  - Superman II: The Richard Donner Cut (2006)
  - Superman: Doomsday (2007)
  - Superman/Batman: Public Enemies (2009)
  - Superman/Batman: Apocalypse (2010)
  - Superman/Shazam!: The Return of Black Adam (2010)
  - Superman vs. The Elite (2012)
  - Superman Unbound (2013)
  - Superman: Red Son (2020)
  - Superman: Man of Tomorrow (2020)
- Super/Man: The Christopher Reeve Story (2024)
- Supermarket (1974)
- Supermarket Woman (1996)
- Supernatural (1933)
- The Supernatural Events on Campus (2013)
- Supernova: (2000 & 2020)
- Superstar: (1999, 2008 Hindi, 2008 Sinhala, 2009, 2012, 2017 & 2019)
- Superstar in a Housedress (2004)
- Supervixens (1976)
- The Supper (1992)
- Support Your Local Gunfighter (1971)
- Support Your Local Sheriff! (1969)
- El Sur (1983)
- Sur mes lèvres (2001)
- The Sure Thing (1985)
- Surf II (1984)
- Surf Nazis Must Die (1987)
- Surf Ninjas (1993)
- The Surfer: (1986 & 2024)
- Surf's Up (2007)
- Surf's Up 2: WaveMania (2017)
- Surplus: Terrorized into Being Consumers (2003)
- Surprise (2015)
- The Surprise (2015)
- Surrender: (1927, 1931, 1950, 1987 American & 1987 Bangladeshi)
- Surrender Dorothy (1998)
- Surrender of General Toral (1898)
- Surrogates (2009)
- Surveillance (2008)
- Survival of the Dead (2010)
- Survival Island (2005)
- Survive the Night (2020)
- Surviving Christmas (2004)
- Surviving the Game (1994)
- Surviving Gilligan's Island (2001) (TV)
- Surviving Picasso (1996)
- Survivor (2015)
- The Survivor: (1981, 1996, 2016 & 2021)
- The Survivors: (1979 & 1983)
- Survivors Guide to Prison (2018)
- Susan Slept Here (1954)
- Susana (1951)
- Susannah of the Mounties (1939)
- SuSheela SuJeet (2025)
- Susie Q (1996) (TV)
- Suspect: (1960, 1961, 1987 & 2008)
- The Suspect: (1916, 1944, 1975, 1981, 1998, 2013 American & 2013 South Korean)
- Suspect Zero (2004)
- Suspense (1946)
- Suspicion (1941)
- Suspiria: (1977 & 2018)
- Sutures (2009)
- Suur Tõll (1980)
- Suzanne's Career (1963)
- Suzhou River (2000)
- Suzie Gold (2004)
- Suzume (2022)

=== Sv ===
- Svaha: The Sixth Finger (2019)
- Svatby pana Voka (1970)
- Sven Tuuva the Hero (1958)
- Svengali (1927)
- Svengali (1931)
- Svengali (1954)
- Svengali (1983)
- Svengali (2013)
- Svengarlic (1931)
- Svetlana About Svetlana (2008)
- Svidd neger (2003)

=== Sw ===
==== Swa–Swe ====
- Swades (2004)
- Swallows and Amazons (2016)
- The Swamp: (1921 & 2020)
- Swamp Girl (1971)
- Swamp Shark (2011)
- Swamp Thing (1982)
- Swamp Water (1941)
- Swamp Woman (1941)
- Swamp Women (1955)
- The Swan: (1925 & 1956)
- Swan Lake (1981)
- The Swan Princess series:
  - The Swan Princess (1994)
  - The Swan Princess: A Royal Family Tale (2014)
  - The Swan Princess: Escape from Castle Mountain (1997)
  - The Swan Princess: The Mystery of the Enchanted Kingdom (1998)
  - The Swan Princess: Princess Tomorrow, Pirate Today (2016)
  - The Swan Princess: Royally Undercover (2017)
  - The Swan Princess Christmas (2012)
- Swan Song: (1945, 1992, 2021 Benjamin Cleary & 2021 Todd Stephens)
- The Swap: (1979 & 2016 TV)
- Swapped (2026)
- The Swarm: (1978, 1990 & 2020)
- Swashbuckler (1976)
- Sweat: (2002 & 2020)
- The Swedish Kings (1968)
- A Swedish Love Story (1970)
- A Swedish Tiger (1948)
- Sweeney Todd (1928)
- Sweeney Todd: The Demon Barber of Fleet Street: (1936 & 2007)
- Sweet 20 (2015)
- Sweet & Sour (2021)
- Sweet Angel (2011)
- Sweet Bean (2015)
- Sweet Bird of Youth (1962)
- Sweet Body of Bianca (1984)
- The Sweet Body of Deborah (1968)
- Sweet Bunch (1983)
- Sweet Charity (1969)
- Sweet Dreams: (1981, 1985, 1996 TV, 2012 & 2016)
- The Sweet Escape (2015)
- Sweet Girl (2021)
- The Sweet Hereafter (1997)
- Sweet Home Alabama (2002)
- Sweet Jam (2004)
- Sweet Jesus, Preacherman (1973)
- Sweet Land (2008)
- Sweet Liberty (1986)
- Sweet and Lowdown (1999)
- Sweet Movie (1974)
- Sweet November: (1968 & 2001)
- A Sweet Scent of Death (1999)
- The Sweet Sins of Sexy Susan (1967)
- Sweet Sixteen: (1983, 2002 & 2016)
- Sweet Smell of Success (1957)
- Sweet of the Song (2016)
- Sweet Sweetback's Baadasssss Song (1971)
- Sweet, Sweet Lonely Girl (2016)
- Sweet Taste of Souls (2020)
- Sweet Toronto (1988)
- Sweet Virginia (2017)
- A Sweeter Song (1976)
- The Sweetest Thing (2002)
- Sweetgrass (2009)
- Sweetie: (1929 & 1989)
- Swept Away: (1974 & 2002)
- Swept Away by an Unusual Destiny in the Blue Sea of August (1974)
- Swept from the Sea (1998)

==== Swi ====
- The Swift Shadow (1927)
- A Swim Lesson (2024)
- swimfan (2002)
- The Swimmer (1968)
- The Swimmer (2021)
- Swimmers (2005)
- The Swimmers (2022)
- Swimming (2000)
- Swimming to Cambodia (1987)
- Swimming Out Till the Sea Turns Blue (2020)
- Swimming Pool: (1976, 2001 & 2003)
- The Swimming Pool: (1969, 1977 & 2012)
- Swimming with Sharks (1994)
- Swimming Upstream (2003)
- The Swimsuit Issue (2008)
- Swindle: (2002 & 2013 TV)
- The Swindle (1997)
- The Swindler (1919)
- The Swindlers: (1963 & 2017)
- The Swing (1983)
- Swing Girls (2004)
- Swing it, magistern! (1940)
- Swing Kids: (1993 & 2018)
- Swing Parade of 1946 (1946)
- The Swing School (1938)
- Swing Shift (1984)
- Swing Time (1936)
- Swing Vote: (1999 & 2008)
- The Swinger (1966)
- Swingers: (1996 & 2002)
- A Swingin' Summer (1965)
- The Swinging Barmaids (1975)
- The Swinging Cheerleaders (1974)
- The Swinging Confessors (1970)
- The Swinging Teacher (1973)
- Swiss Army Man (2016)
- The Swiss Conspiracy (1976)
- Swiss Family Robinson: (1940 & 1960)
- The Swissmakers (1978)
- Switch: (1991, 2007, 2011, 2012, 2013 & 2023)
- The Switch (1963)
- The Switch (2010)
- The Switch (2022)
- A Switch in Time (1988)
- The Switch Tower (1913)
- Switchback (1997)
- A Switchback Railway (1898)
- The Switched Bride (1934)
- Switching Channels (1988)

==== Swo ====
- Swoon (1992)
- Swooner Crooner (1944)
- Swooning the Swooners (1945)
- Swopnodanay (2007)
- Sword Art Online series:
  - Sword Art Online the Movie: Ordinal Scale (2017)
  - Sword Art Online Progressive: Aria of a Starless Night (2021)
  - Sword Art Online Progressive: Scherzo of Deep Night (2022)
- Sword of the Avenger (1948
- Sword of the Beast (1965)
- Sword of Blood and Valour (1958–59)
- A Sword for Brando (1970)
- Sword of the Conqueror (1961)
- Sword in the Desert (1949)
- Sword of Desperation (2010)
- The Sword of Doom (1966)
- The Sword and the Dragon (1956)
- Sword of the Empire (1964)
- Sword Fishing (1939)
- Sword of Gideon (1986) (TV)
- Sword of God (2018)
- Sword for Hire (1952)
- Sword of Honour (1939)
- Sword of Honour (2001) (TV)
- Sword Master (2016)
- Sword in the Moon (2003)
- Sword of Penitence (1927)
- The Sword and the Rose (1953)
- Sword in the Shadows (1961)
- Sword of Sherwood Forest (1960)
- Sword and Shield (1926)
- The Sword and the Sorcerer (1982)
- Sword Stained with Royal Blood (1981)
- The Sword Stained with Royal Blood (1993)
- The Sword in the Stone (1963)
- Sword of the Stranger (2007)
- Sword of Trust (2019)
- Sword for Truth (1990)
- Sword of the Valiant (1984)
- Sword of Vengeance (2014)
- Sword of Venus (1953)
- Swordfish (2001)
- Swords and Hearts (1911)
- The Swordsman: (1948, 1974, 1990 & 2020)
- Swordsman II (1992)
- Swordsman of Siena (1962)
- Swordsmen in Double Flag Town (1991)
- Sworn Brothers (1987)
- Sworn Enemy (1936)
- Sworn Virgin (2015)

=== Sy–Sz ===
- Sydney White (2007)
- Sylvia (2003)
- Sylvia Scarlett (1935)
- Sylvie's Love (2020)
- Symbiopsychotaxiplasm (1968)
- Sympathy for the Devil: (1968 & 2019)
- Sympathy for Lady Vengeance (2005)
- Sympathy for Mr. Vengeance (2002)
- Synanon (1965)
- Synchronic (2019)
- Synchronicity (2015)
- Syndromes and a Century (2006)
- Synecdoche, New York (2009)
- The Syrian Bride (2004)
- Syngenor (1990)
- Syriana (2005)
- Szindbád (1971)

Previous: List of films: Q–R Next: List of films: T

== See also ==
- Lists of films
- Lists of actors
- List of film and television directors
- List of documentary films
- List of film production companies
