= GSE Systems =

GSE Performance Solutions, LLC
- Type: Private
- Traded as: Nasdaq: GVP; Russell Microcap Index component
- Industry: Process Controls Operator Training Simulator Educational Software
- Founded: 1994; 32 years ago
- Headquarters: Columbia, Maryland
- Key people: Ravi Khanna (CEO); Brian Papson (CFO)
- Revenue: ▲$34.5 Million USD (2023)
- Owner: Pelican Energy Partners; (2024–present)
- Number of employees: 271
- Website: www.gses.com

GSE Performance Solutions, LLC develops and markets software-based simulation and training products to nuclear, oil, and gas electricity generators, and the chemical process industries. It also sells software for monitoring and optimizing plant and signal analysis to the power industry.

On November 1, 2024, the company announced that it had completed its merger with an affiliate of Pelican Energy Partners.

== Overview ==
GSE Systems was established in 1994 from three simulation companies that came together. They were part of an original heritage from Singer-Link where they were involved in high-intensity simulation applications such as flight simulators.

Since 1994 the company has grown through acquisitions. The primary businesses continue to be process control focused in the chemical, pharmaceutical and food industry, and simulation, which is also focused on fossil and nuclear simulation.

GSE Systems is headquartered in suburban Baltimore, Maryland. Global operations are conducted from offices in Columbia (Maryland), Ft. Worth (Texas), and Beijing (China).

== Timeline ==
- 1929: Edwin Albert Link invents and patents the first Link Trainer, forms Link Aeronautical Corporation in Binghamton, NY.
- 1930: Link Flying School organized in Binghamton.
- 1933: Link Aeronautical Corporation moves to Endicott, NY to maintain the flight school, repair airplanes, and operate charter flights.
- 1934: Link Aeronautical Corporation returns to Binghamton.
- 1935: Link Aviation Devices, Inc. is formed in Binghamton, NY to manufacture trainers etc. Link Aviation Devices, Inc. renamed Link Aviation, Inc.
- 1937: Link Manufacturing Company Limited is formed in Gananoque, Ontario to build trainers for Canadian and UK customers.
- 1953: Ed Link steps down as president of Link Aviation.
- 1954: Ed and George Link sell Link Aviation to General Precision Equipment Corporation.
- 1956: Link Aviation acquires a controlling interest in Air Trainers Limited of England and changes its name to Air Trainers Link Limited.
- 1959: Ownership of Air Trainers Link Limited is transferred to the parent company, GPE, and the name changes to General Precision Systems Ltd.
- 1965: GPE buys the operations of the Riverdale, MD plant of Electronics Division of ACF Industries (previously ERCO) and moves it to Silver Spring, MD.
- 1967: Redifon, a member of Rediffusion, buys Air Trainers Link Ltd. and renames it Redifon Air Trainers Ltd.
- 1968: Singer Corporation acquires GPE. Edwin Link remains as consultant until 1972.
- 1984: Simuflite Training International Inc. is founded by Singer.
- 1987: Singer’s Link Division is incorporated as Link Corporation.
- 1988: Paul A. Bilzerian buys Singer Corporation.
- 1988: CAE Industries, Ltd. buys Link Corporation of Silver Spring, MD.
- 1988: Singer’s simulation manufacturing business is reorganized under the name of LinkMiles with two companies: Link-Miles Limited located in Lancing, England and LinkMiles International Simulation Corporation based in Binghamton, NY.
- 1989: Singer is renamed Bicoastal Corporation.
- 1989: Bicoastal Corporation files Chapter 11 bankruptcy.
- 1990: Link-Miles Simulation Corporation of Columbia, MD is renamed S3 Technologies.
- 1990: Thomson-CSF of France buys Link-Miles Limited, merges it with Redifussion Simulation, and renames it Thomson Training & Simulation.
- 1992: Bicoastal Corporation is dissolved.
- 1993: ManTech International buys S3 Technologies.
- 1994: GSE Systems (Global Simulation & Engineering Systems) absorbs S3 Technologies.
- 1995: Hughes Electronics Corporation buys CAE-Link.
- 2024: Pelican Energy Partners acquires GSE Performance Solutions, LLC.

=== Major Milestones ===
In 2011, Construction of Westinghouse AP1000 nuclear power plant simulator, a first-of-a-kind project. The simulators were built for Sanmen Nuclear Power Station and Haiyang Nuclear Power Plant in China, also Vogtle Electric Generating Plant and Virgil C. Summer Nuclear Generating Station in US.

In 1977, GSE was a pioneer provider of high-fidelity refinery and fossil power plant simulators. Since then, GSE has built more full-scope simulators than all of its competitors combined.

In 1971, GSE Systems, then Singer-Link Simulation, built one of the early stage commercial full-scope nuclear power plant simulators. During 1968-1973 period there were four simulators commissioned by nuclear steam supply system (NSSS) vendors, which were General Electric, Westinghouse, Babcock & Wilcox, and Combustion Engineering. The later two were built by Singer-Link. The first utility-owned simulator was manufactured by Singer-Link for the Consolidated Edison Company in Buchanan, N.Y., which represented Indian Point 2, was ready for training in 1975.

== Major Acquisitions ==
GSE Performance Solutions, LLC acquired EnVision Systems in 2011. EnVision Systems, founded in 1991 and based in Madison, NJ with an office in Chennai, India, developed multimedia training software and simulation models for the petrochemical and oil and gas refining industries. Following the acquisition, EnVision's offerings were integrated into GSE Systems' simulation and training products. EnVision Systems has completed more than 750 installations in over 28 countries and served approximately 130 clients, including Shell Oil Company, BP, Total and Chevron.
