= Harbor Branch Oceanographic Institute =

Oceanographic research institution in the United States

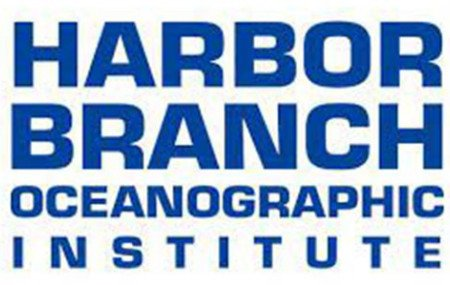
- Former names: Harbor Branch Foundation; Harbor Branch Oceanographic Institution
- Type: Research Institute
- Established: 1971; 55 years ago
- Founder: J. Seward Johnson, Sr.
- Parent institution: Florida Atlantic University
- Director: James M. Sullivan
- Total staff: 200
- Location: 5600 US-1, Fort Pierce, Florida, 34946, United States; 27.534053°N 80.355453°W
- Campus: 144-acre (0.58 km^{2})
- Website: www.fau.edu/hboi/
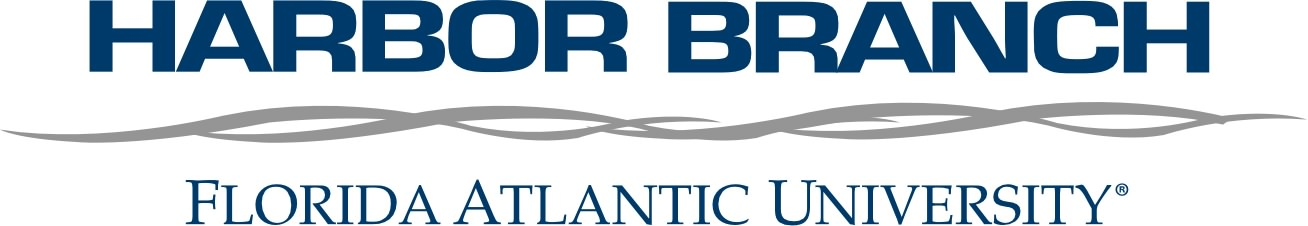

Harbor Branch Oceanographic Institute (HBOI, FAU Harbor Branch) is a non-profit oceanographic institution operated by Florida Atlantic University in Fort Pierce, Florida, United States. Founded in 1971 as non-profit research organization, the institution was transferred to FAU in 2007.

== History ==
HBOI was founded in 1971 as Harbor Branch Foundation by J. Seward Johnson, Sr. in collaboration with Edwin Albert Link as a non-profit research organization. The name was subsequently changed to Harbor Branch Oceanographic Institution. Link built the Johnson Sea Link, type of deep-sea scientific research submersibles. The first submersible, Johnson Sea Link I was built in 1971 and was the successor to Link's previous submersible, Deep Diver. Johnson Sea Link II was built in 1975.

In December 2007, the assets and parcels of land of the research institute were transferred to FAU and the current name was adapted. To fund the acquisition, the State of Florida allocated $44.6 million in one-time construction costs plus $8.5 million in annual operating funds. The governing board of the former HBOI then became the governing board of the Harbor Branch Oceanographic Institute Foundation which retained other parcels of land, an endowment funded by the J. Seward Johnson, Sr. Charitable Trust Endowment Fund and the Seward Johnson Trust Fund for Oceanography, and as the legislatively-dictated recipient of four Florida Specialty License plates. The Harbor Branch Oceanographic Institute Foundation exists today with a mission to support the Harbor Branch Oceanographic Institute. The foundation funds are partially controlled by the FAU board.

== Campus ==
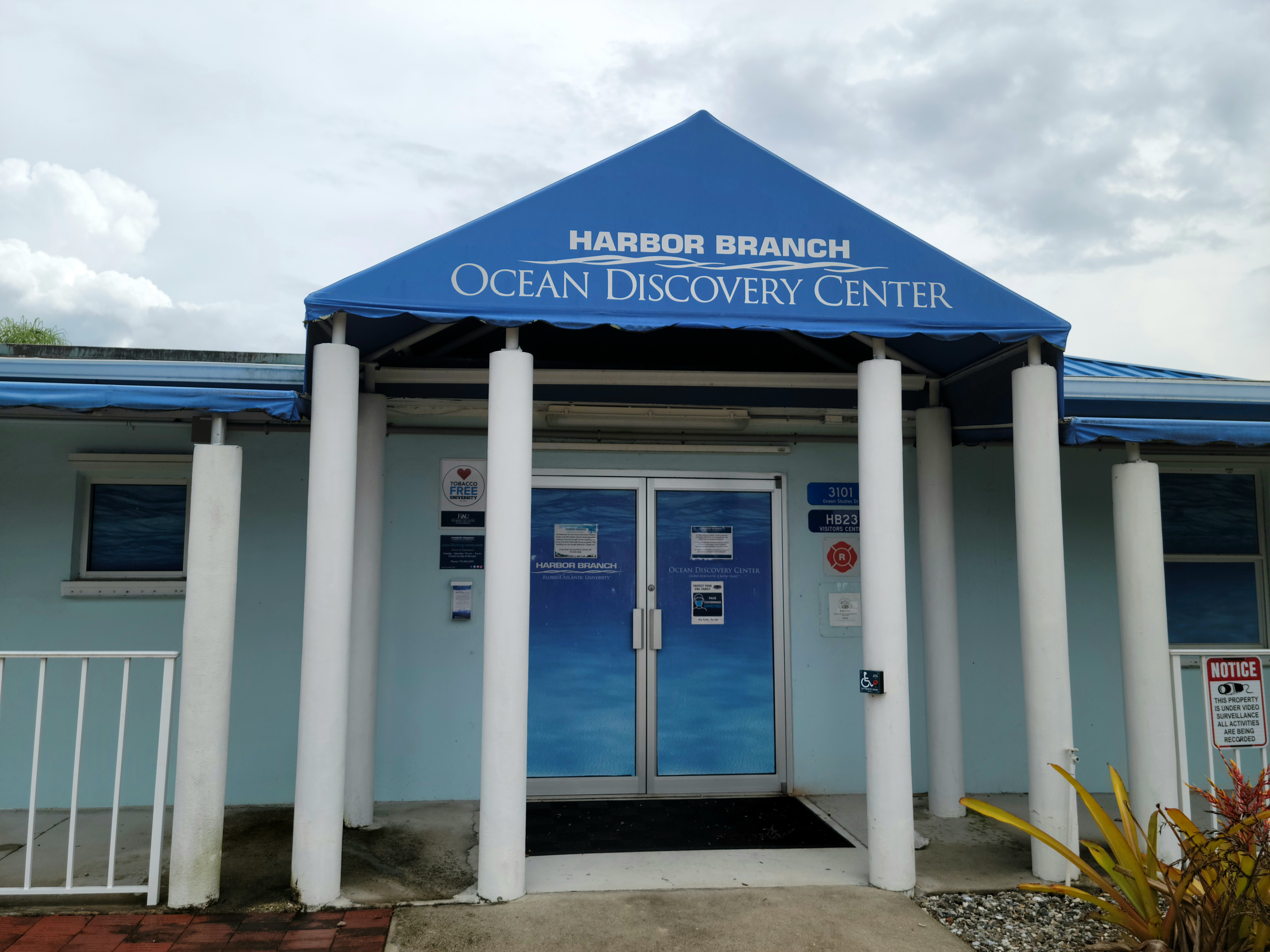
HBOI Welcome Center

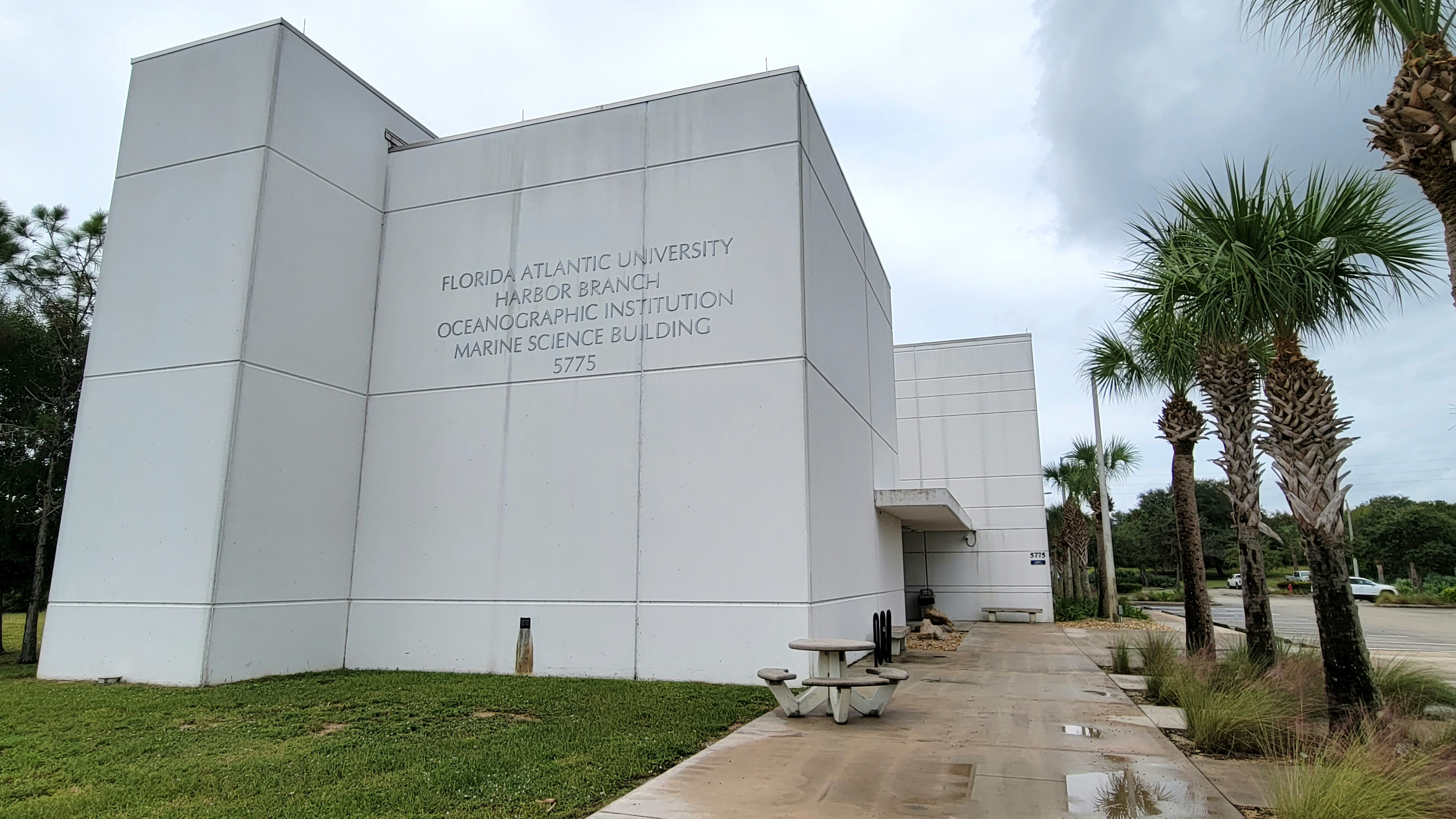
HBOI-FAU Marine Science Building.

HBOI is located on a 144-acre (0.58 km^{2}) campus along the Indian River Lagoon north of Fort Pierce, Florida along the Indian River Lagoon estuary and near an Atlantic Ocean inlet. The campus hosts 32 buildings and more than 150 faculty and staff. It is the northernmost campus of the university.

== Academics ==
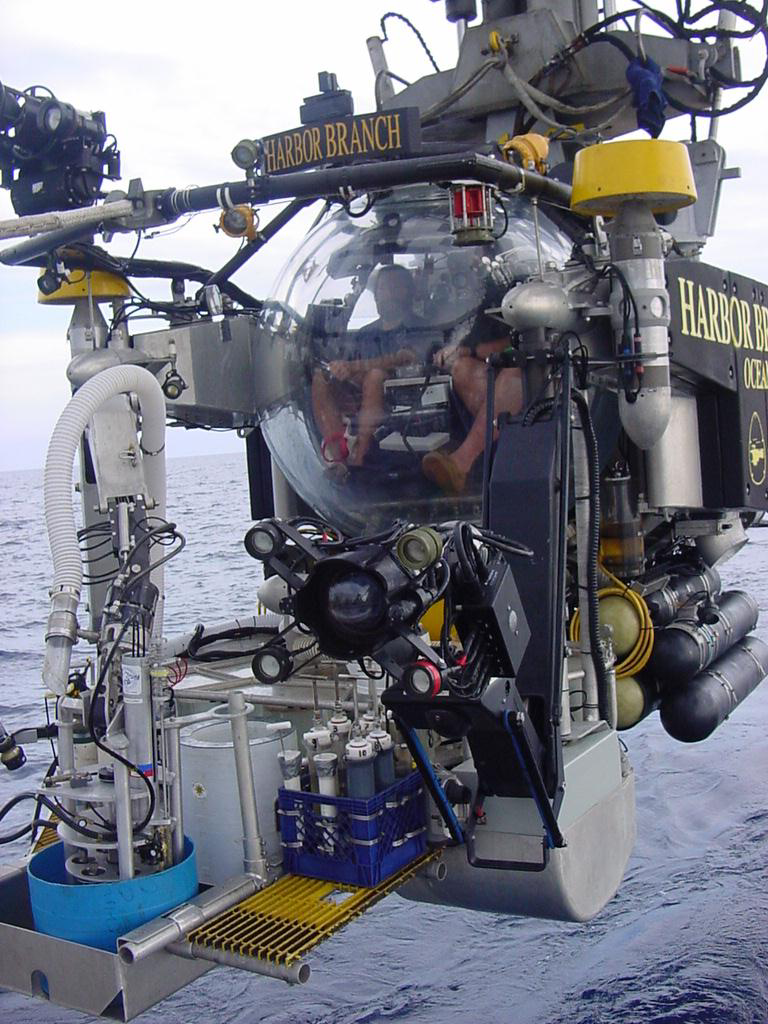
The Johnson Sea Link.

HBOI research and education focuses on biological oceanography, estuarine to deep sea ecology, aquaculture, discovery and development of natural products for medicines and other uses, and ocean engineering. Its staff includes more than 160 scientists, engineers, mariners, and support personnel. Funding sources include grants and Florida state educational and general funds, Florida specialty license plates, donations, and other institutional support.

HBOI accounts for about one-third of FAU's research activity, in the following research areas:

- Aquaculture & Stock Enhancement
- Marine Biomedical & Biotechnology Research
- Marine Ecosystem Health
- Ocean Dynamics and Modeling
- Marine Science Education
- Ocean Engineering & Technology

=== Harbor Branch Ocean Discovery Center ===
The Harbor Branch Ocean Discovery Center is open to the public in Fort Pierce. The Center features interactive exhibits about the environment of the ocean, live marine creatures, a video theater, and displays about the research activities of the Institute. The Center is closed on Sundays and major holidays.

=== NOAA CIOERT ===
Since May 2009, HBOI has been the headquarters of the National Oceanographic and Atmospheric Administration's Cooperative Institute for Ocean Exploration, Research & Technology (CIOERT), which is co-managed by University of North Carolina Wilmington and includes partners SRI International, the Rosenstiel School of Marine & Atmospheric Science, and the Cooperative Institute for Marine and Atmospheric Science. CIOERT priorities include development of advanced underwater technologies, exploration and research of frontier regions of the eastern US continental shelf and beyond, improved understanding of vulnerable deep and shallow coral ecosystems, and improved ocean literacy.

=== Marine and Oceanographic Academy ===
Since August 2007, HBOI has been home to Westwood High School's Marine and Oceanographic Academy (MOA), a magnet school with a diverse student body from across the St. Lucie County School District. The school, formed through a partnership between HBOI and the school district, infuses a marine and oceanographic focus into the core high school curriculum.

== Accomplishments ==
- More than 9,400 ocean exploration and sample collection dives used the Johnson Sea Link submersible, which was capable of reaching more than a half-mile under the ocean, and libraries of marine sponges and microbial creatures numbering in the tens of thousands.
- Discovery of the Challenger space shuttle rocket booster on the ocean floor – "the smoking gun that proved a faulty O-ring caused the 1986 explosion".
- Examination of the wreckage of the USS Monitor, an ironclad Civil War battleship that sank in 1862.
- Assistance in the December 2005 rescue of Winter, the bottlenose dolphin featured in the 2011 movie Dolphin Tale.
