= Hughes Electronics =

American electronics company

Hughes Electronics Corporation
- Type: Subsidiary
- Industry: Electronics
- Predecessor: Delco Electronics; Hughes Aircraft
- Founded: 1985; 41 years ago
- Defunct: 2003; 23 years ago
- Fate: Purchased by News Corporation and rebranded as The DirecTV Group
- Successor: The DirecTV Group
- Headquarters: United States
- Parent: General Motors
- Subsidiaries: DirecTV; DirecTV Latin America/Vrio; PanAmSat; Hughes Network Systems

Hughes Electronics Corporation was an American electronics company formed in 1985, when Hughes Aircraft was sold by the Howard Hughes Medical Institute to General Motors for $5.2 billion. Surviving parts of Hughes Electronics are today known as DirecTV Group, while the automotive divisions became Aptiv.

== History ==
On June 5, 1985, General Motors was announced as the winner of a secretive five-month, sealed-bid auction. Other bidders included Ford Motor Company and Boeing. The purchase was completed on December 20, 1985, for an estimated $5.2 billion, with $2.7 billion in cash and the remainder in 50 million shares of GM Class H stock. On December 31, 1985, General Motors merged Hughes Aircraft with its Delco Electronics unit to form Hughes Electronics Corporation, an independent subsidiary.

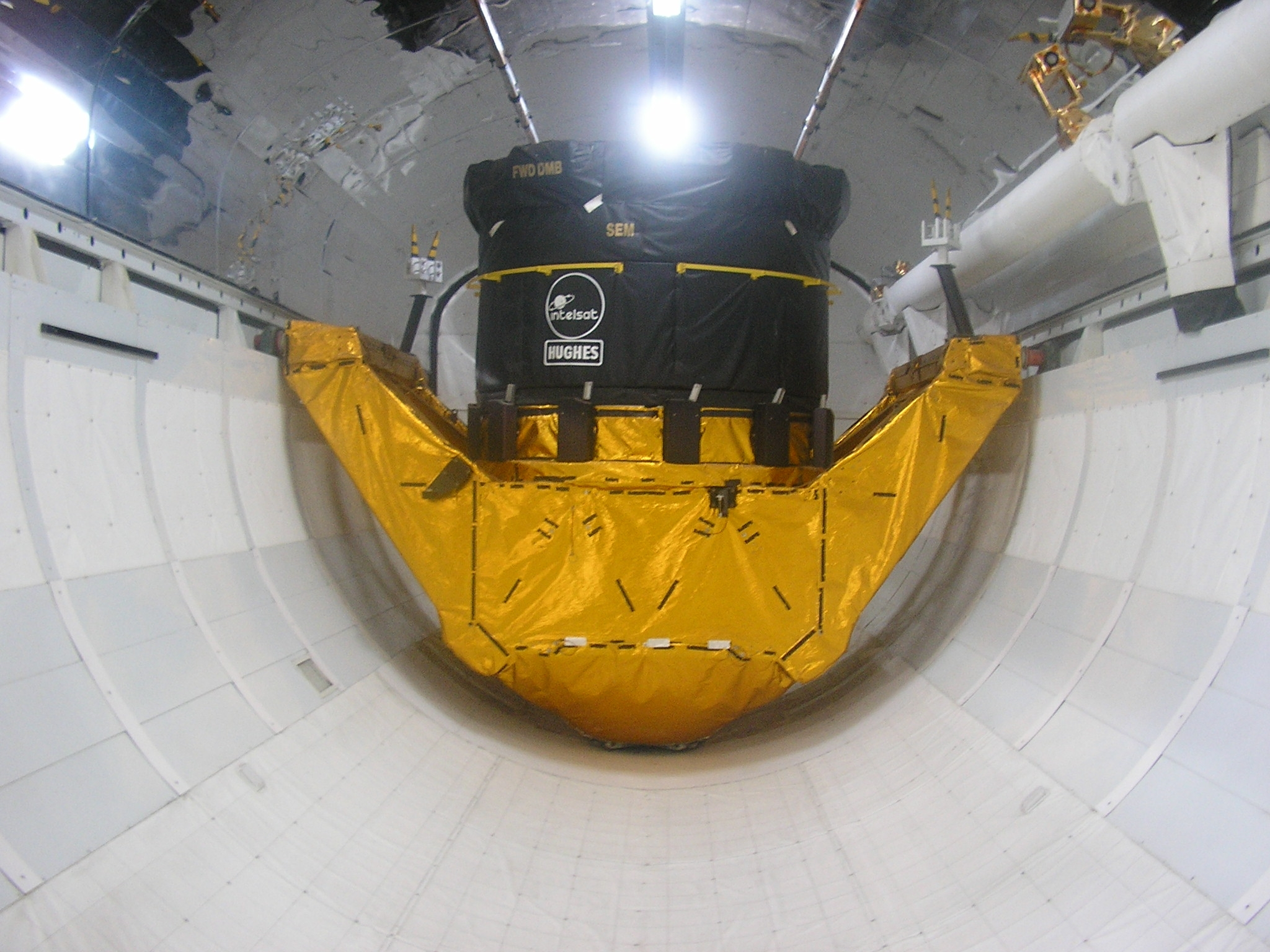
Display of a Hughes satellite inside the Space Shuttle Explorer

In August 1992, Hughes Aircraft completed its purchase of General Dynamics' missile businesses for $450 million. This brought the Tomahawk Cruise Missile, Advanced Cruise Missile, Standard missile, Stinger missile, Phalanx Close-in weapon system, and Rolling Airframe Missile into Hughes' portfolio.

In 1994, Hughes Electronics introduced DirecTV, the world's first high-powered direct broadcast satellite. In 1995, Hughes Electronics' Hughes Space and Communications division became the largest supplier of commercial satellites. That same year, the group purchased Magnavox Electronic Systems from the Carlyle Group. In 1996, Hughes Electronics and PanAmSat agreed to merge their fixed satellite services into a new publicly held company, also called PanAmSat, with Hughes Electronics as majority shareholder.

In 1995, Hughes Aircraft sold its Technology Products Division (automated wire and die bonder) to an investor group led by Citicorp, and incorporated the division as Palomar Technologies. In 2008, Citicorp sold the bonder division to the current management team at Palomar Technologies.

In 1997, GM transferred Delco Electronics to its Delphi Automotive Systems business. Later that year, the assets of Hughes Aircraft were sold to Raytheon for $9.5 billion. The remaining companies remained under the Hughes Electronics name and within GM.

In 2000, Boeing purchased three units within Hughes Electronics Corp.: Hughes Space and Communications Co., Hughes Electron Dynamics, and Spectrolab Inc., as well as Hughes Electronics' interest in HRL, the company's primary research laboratory. The four joined Boeing Satellite Systems, a company subsidiary, later becoming the Satellite Development Center, part of Boeing Integrated Defense Systems.

In 2003, the remaining parts of Hughes Electronics (DirecTV, DirecTV Latin America, PanAmSat, Hughes Network Systems) were purchased by News Corporation from GM and renamed The DirecTV Group.

== Timeline ==
- 1985: The HHMI sold Hughes Aircraft to General Motors for $5.2 billion. This was merged with GM's Delco Electronics to form Hughes Electronics Corporation. The group then consisted of:
  - Delco Electronics Corporation
  - Hughes Aircraft Company
- 1987: Hughes Aircraft Company acquired M/A-COM Telecommunications to form Hughes Network Systems.
- 1994: Hughes Electronics introduced DirecTV.
- 1995: Hughes Space and Communications Company became the world's biggest supplier of commercial satellites.
- 1995: Hughes Electronics acquired Magnavox Electronic Systems from the Carlyle Group.
- 1995: Hughes Aircraft acquired CAE-Link; CAE-Link was part of the original company founded by Edwin Link, inventor of the flight simulator.
- 1996: Hughes Electronics and PanAmSat agreed to merge their fixed satellite services into a new publicly held company, also called PanAmSat, with Hughes Electronics as majority shareholder.
- 1997: GM transferred Delco Electronics from Hughes Electronics to its Delphi Automotive Systems. Delphi became independent in 1999.
- 1997: The aerospace and defense operations of Hughes Electronics (Hughes Aircraft) merged with Raytheon; Raytheon also acquired one half of the Hughes Research Laboratories.
- 2000: Hughes Space and Communications Company remained independent until 2000, when it was purchased by Boeing and became Boeing Satellite Development Center. Boeing purchased one third of the HRL Laboratories, LLC which was then co-owned by Boeing, GM and Raytheon.
- 2003: The remaining parts of Hughes Electronics (DirecTV, DirecTV Latin America, PanAmSat and Hughes Network Systems) were purchased by News Corporation and renamed The DirecTV Group.
- 2003: News Corporation sold PanAmSat to Kohlberg Kravis Roberts & Co. (KKR) in August 2004.
- 2004: Director Martin Scorsese used the Hughes Aircraft stage in Playa Vista to film the motion-capture sequences in the film The Aviator.
- 2004: SkyTerra Communications, Inc. completed its purchase of 100% controlling interest in Hughes Network Systems from the DirecTV Group in January 2006.
