= F49 =

F49 may refer to:

- INS Sahyadri (F49)
- Brazilian frigate Rademaker (F49)
- City of Slaton/Larry T Neal Memorial Airport (FAA LID F49)
