= Texas Air Museum =

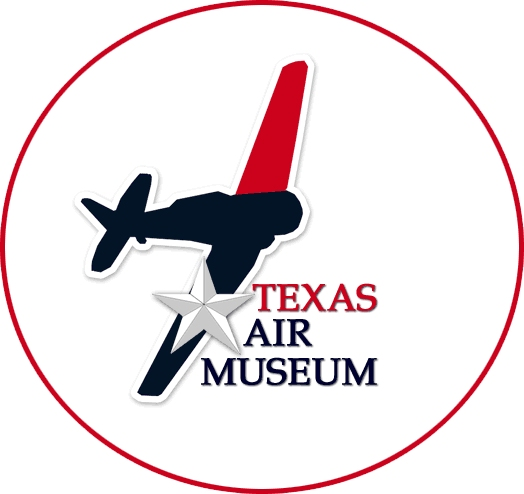
- Established: 1985
- Location: San Antonio, Texas; Slaton, Texas
- Type: Military aviation museum
- Founder: John Houston
- Website: texasairmuseum.org

The Texas Air Museum is an aviation museum run by volunteers in two locations—Stinson Municipal Airport in San Antonio and City of Slaton/Larry T. Neal Memorial Airport near Lubbock, Texas. Texas Air Museum was founded in 1985 by John Houston in Rio Hondo. The Slaton location opened in March 1993. The Stinson Municipal Airport location opened in November 1999.

The museums are run by groups of volunteers predominantly made up of the local city's citizens and military retirees.

The original Rio Hondo location closed on February 28, 2005, due to aging volunteer support, lower attendance, and the damaging salty air of the Rio Grande Valley. Its exhibits and aircraft were transferred to the other two locations.

Both museums focuses on early aviation, and lesser-known aviation related to Texas and Mexico in particular. The Texas Air Museum - Stinson Chapter museum acquired a Bleriot to commemorate the Stinson family, namesakes of Stinson Municipal Airport.

The Slaton museum dedicated the John Beck Hangar in June 2020.

The Stinson museum acquired one PT-23A, two PT-19, and one Fairchild Swearingen Metroliner projects in October 2023.

== Slaton location gallery ==
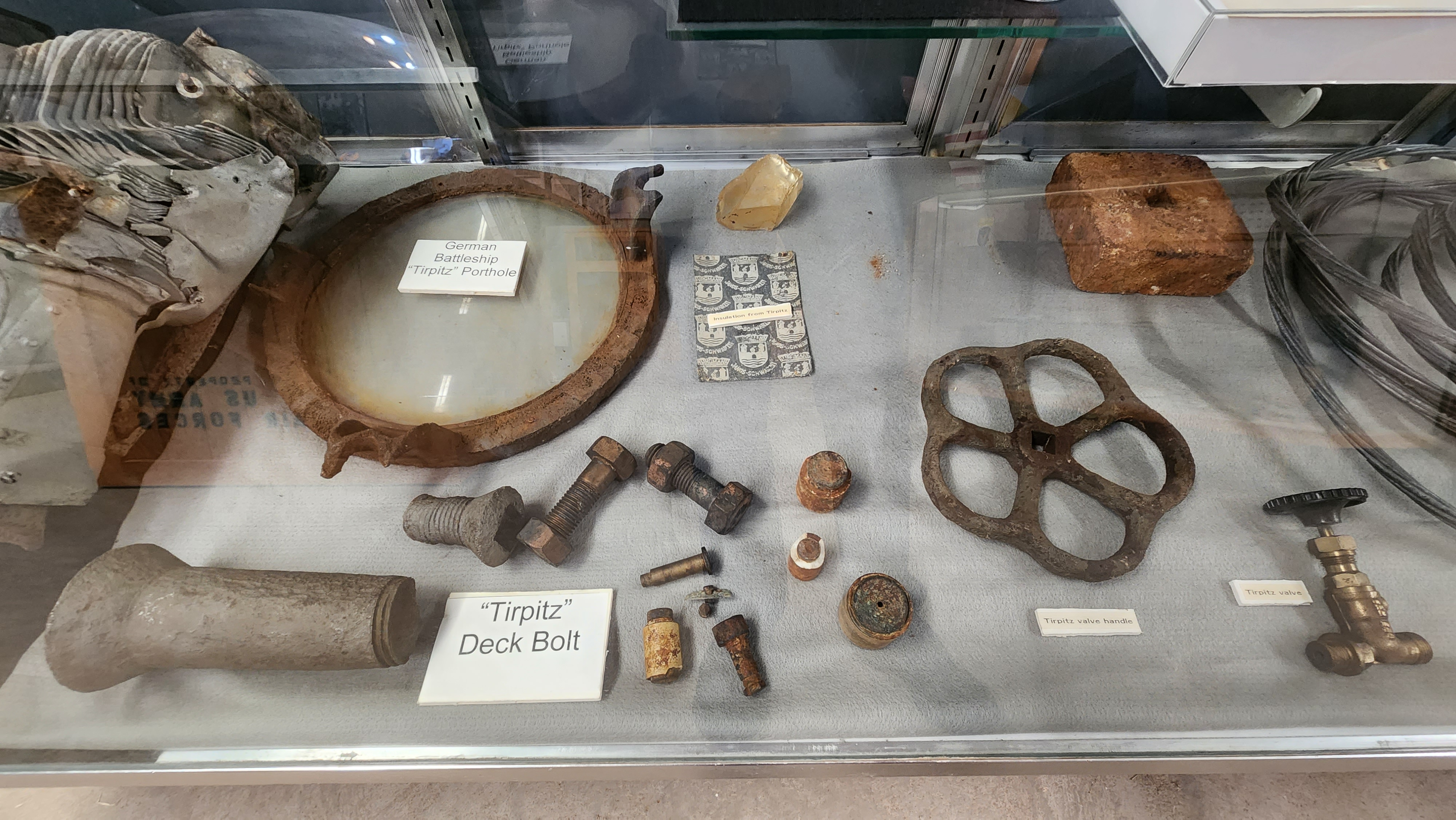
German Battleship Tirpitz hardware recovered from its salvage operation on display in the World War II section of the museum.

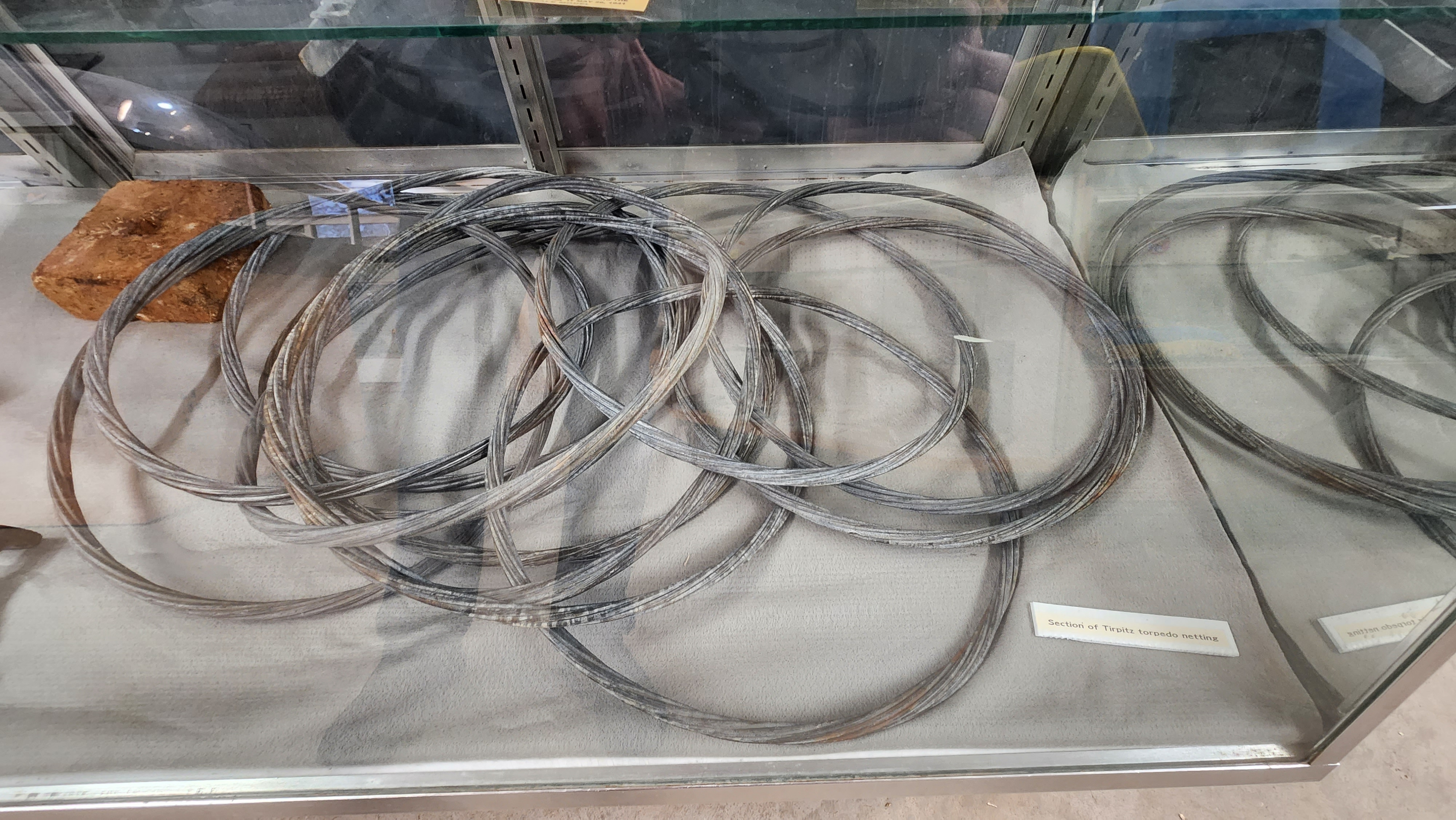
Torpedo wire used to protect the German Battleship Tirpitz while anchored in a Norwegian fjord.

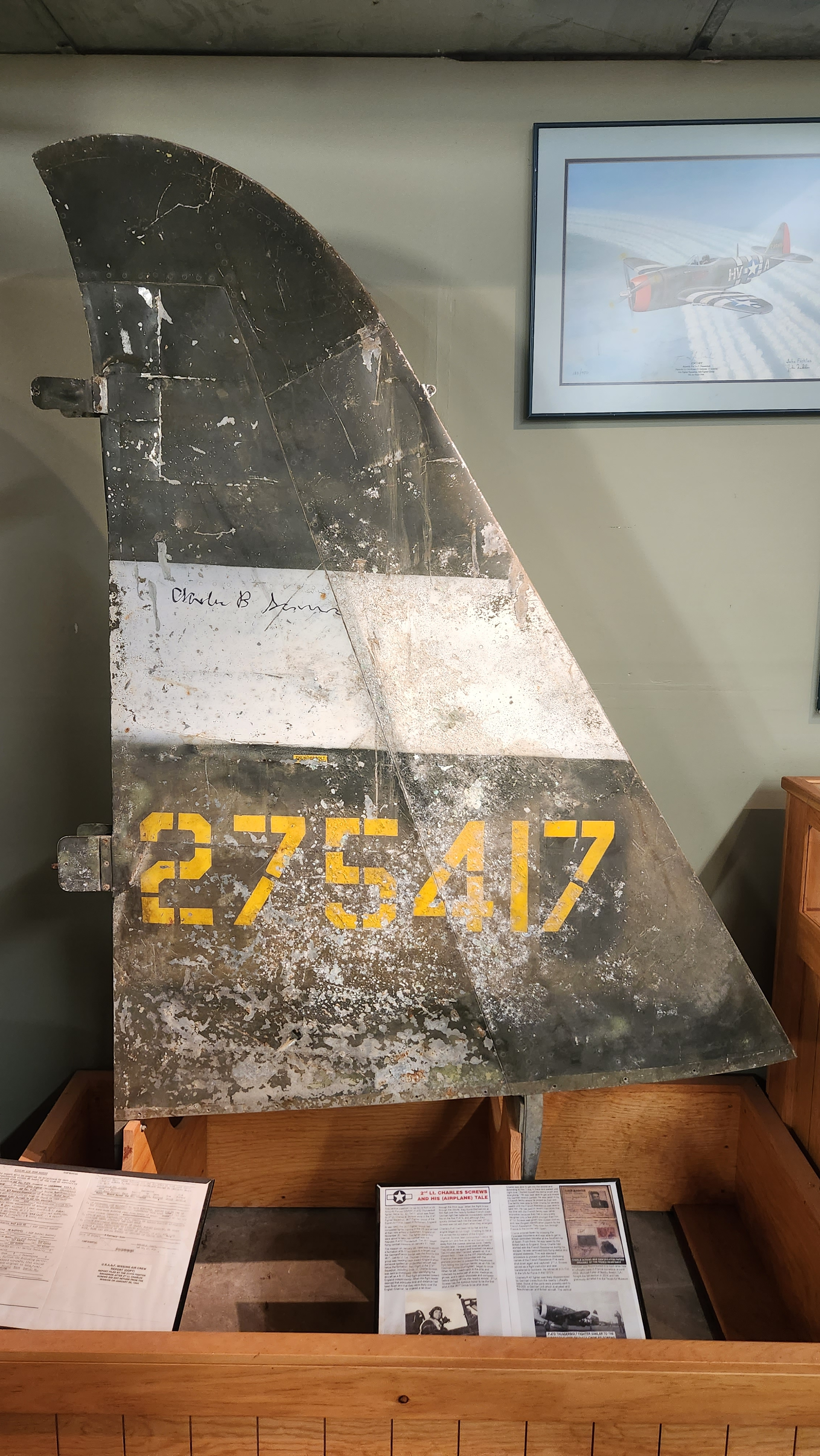
P-47D S/N: 42-75417 vertical stabilizer signed by the pilot who flew it when shot down, Charles Screws.

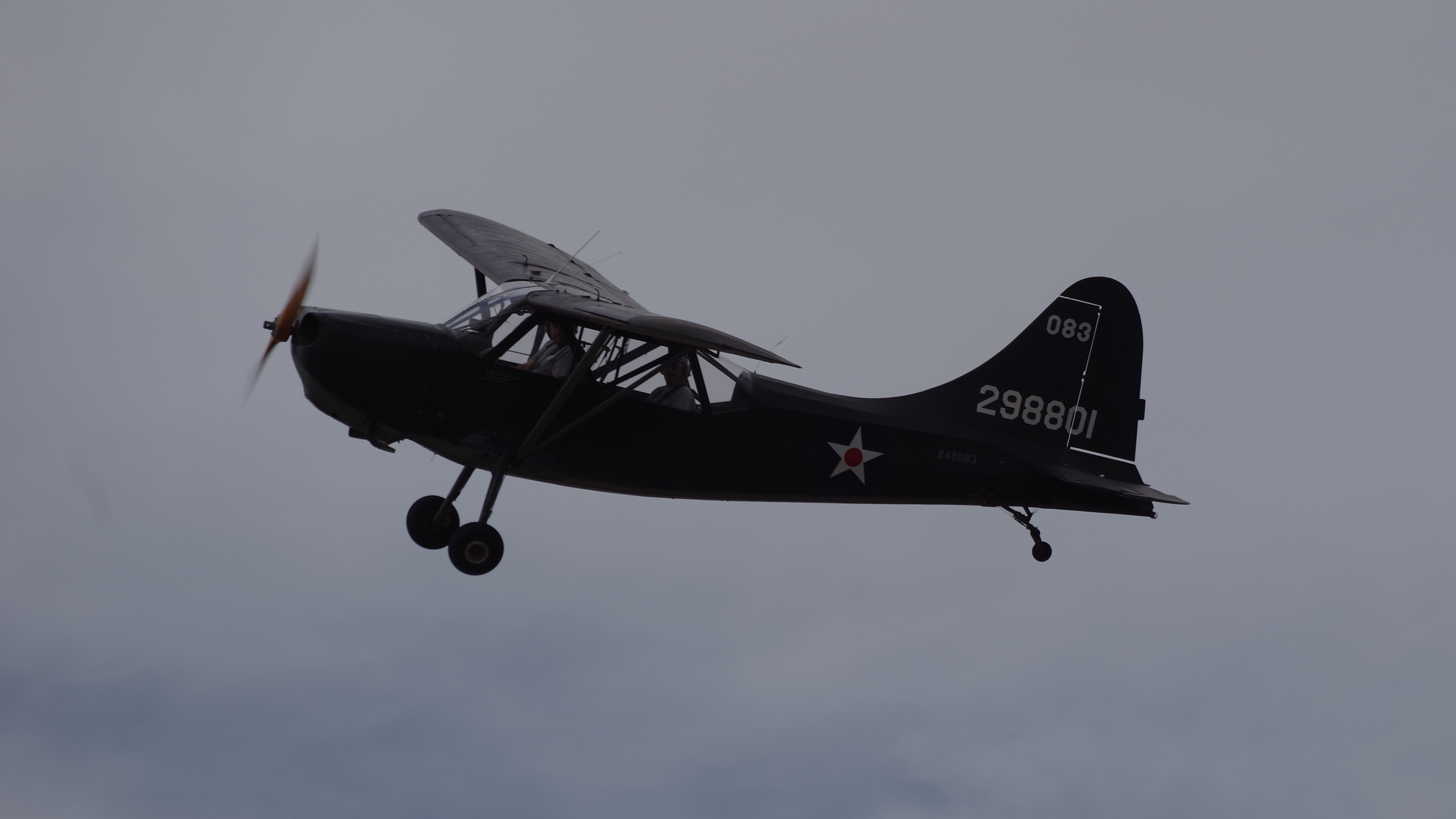
L-5

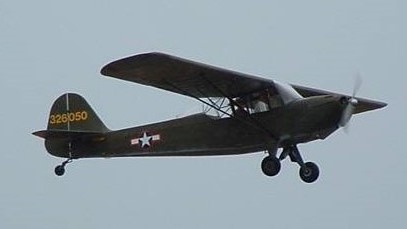
L-2M

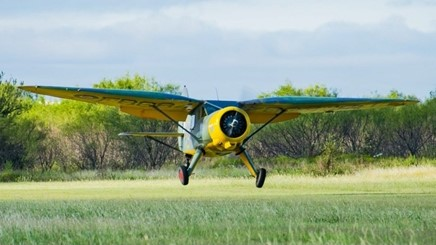
AT-19B

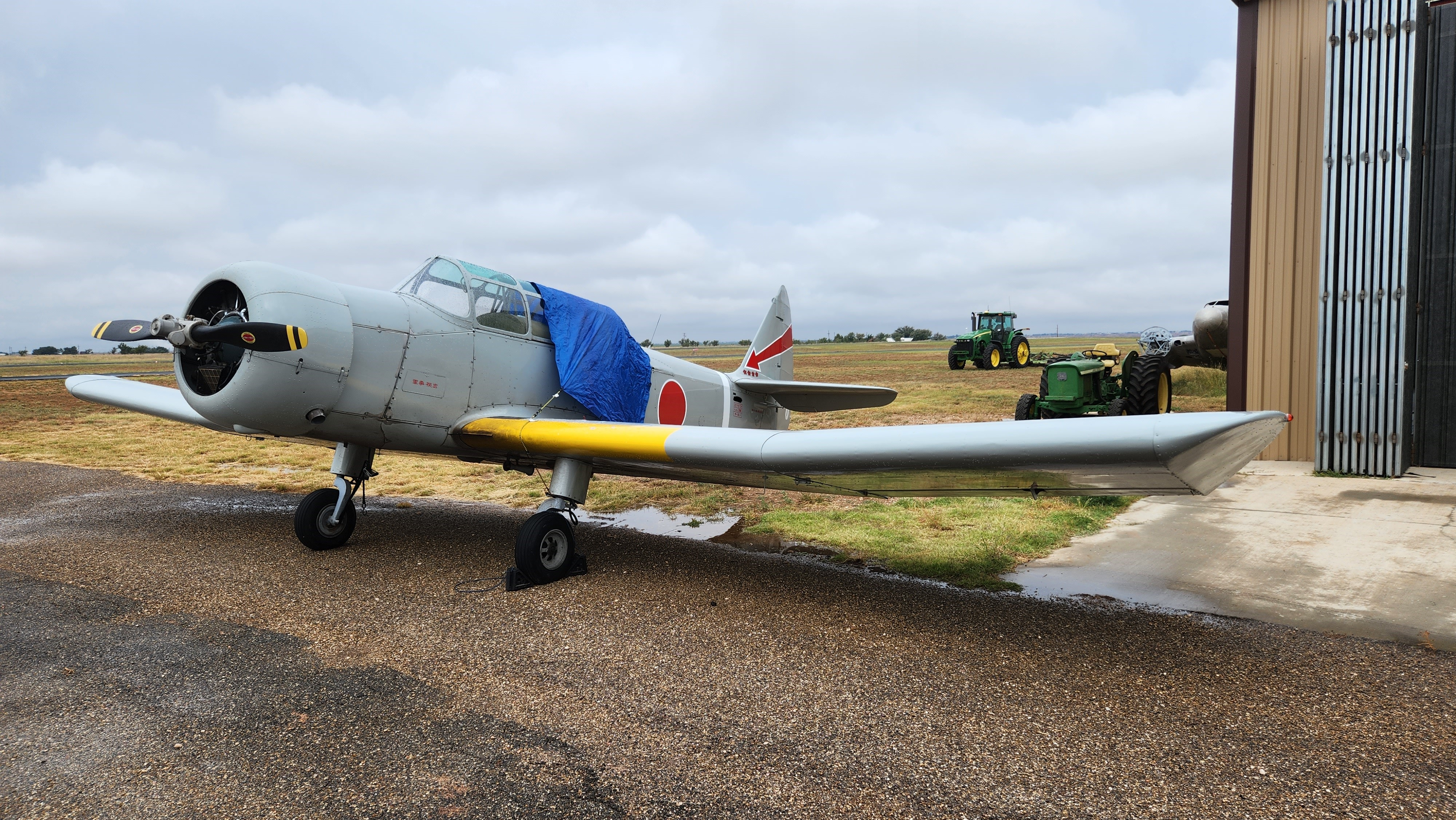
F-23

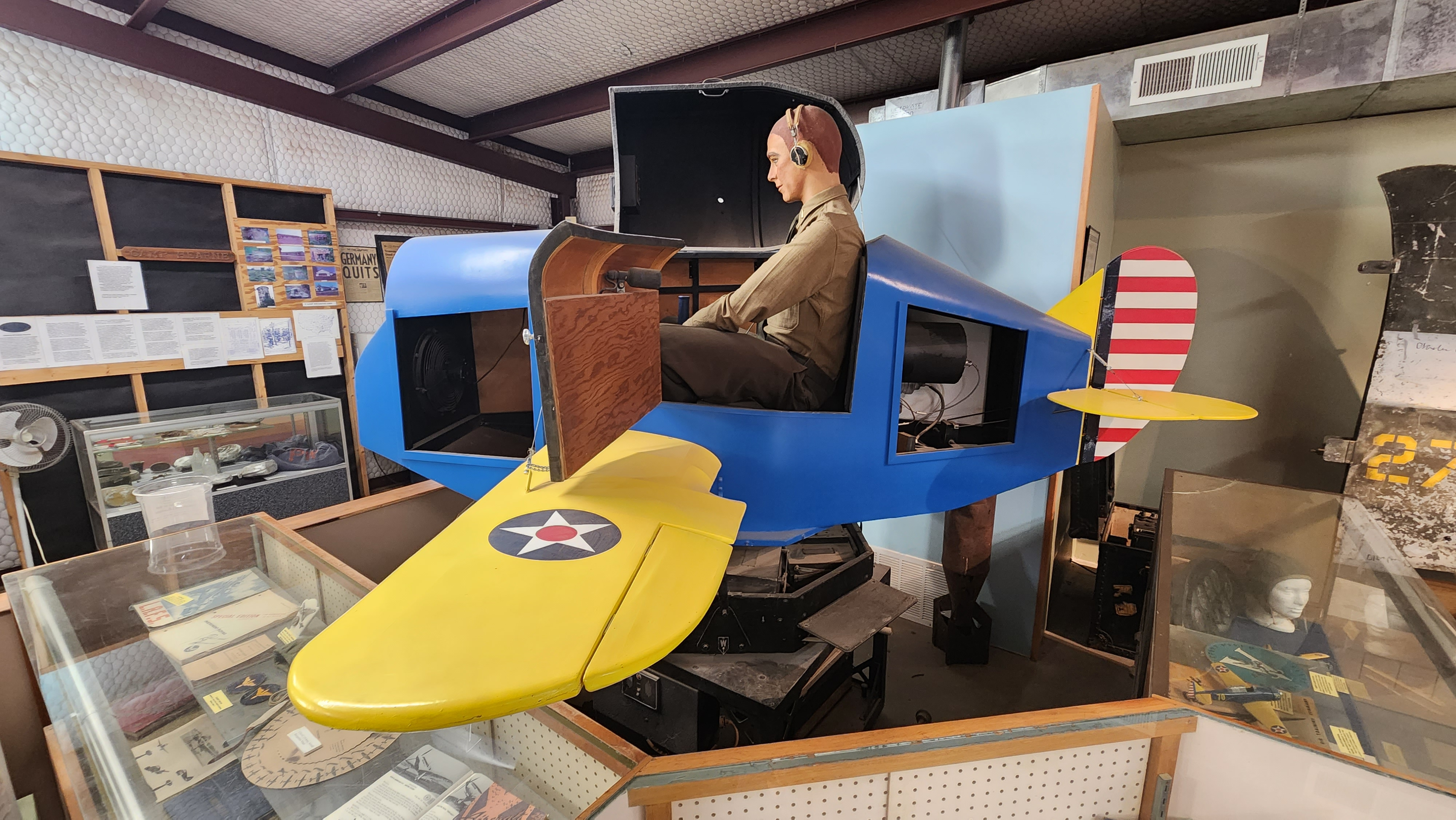
Link Trainer

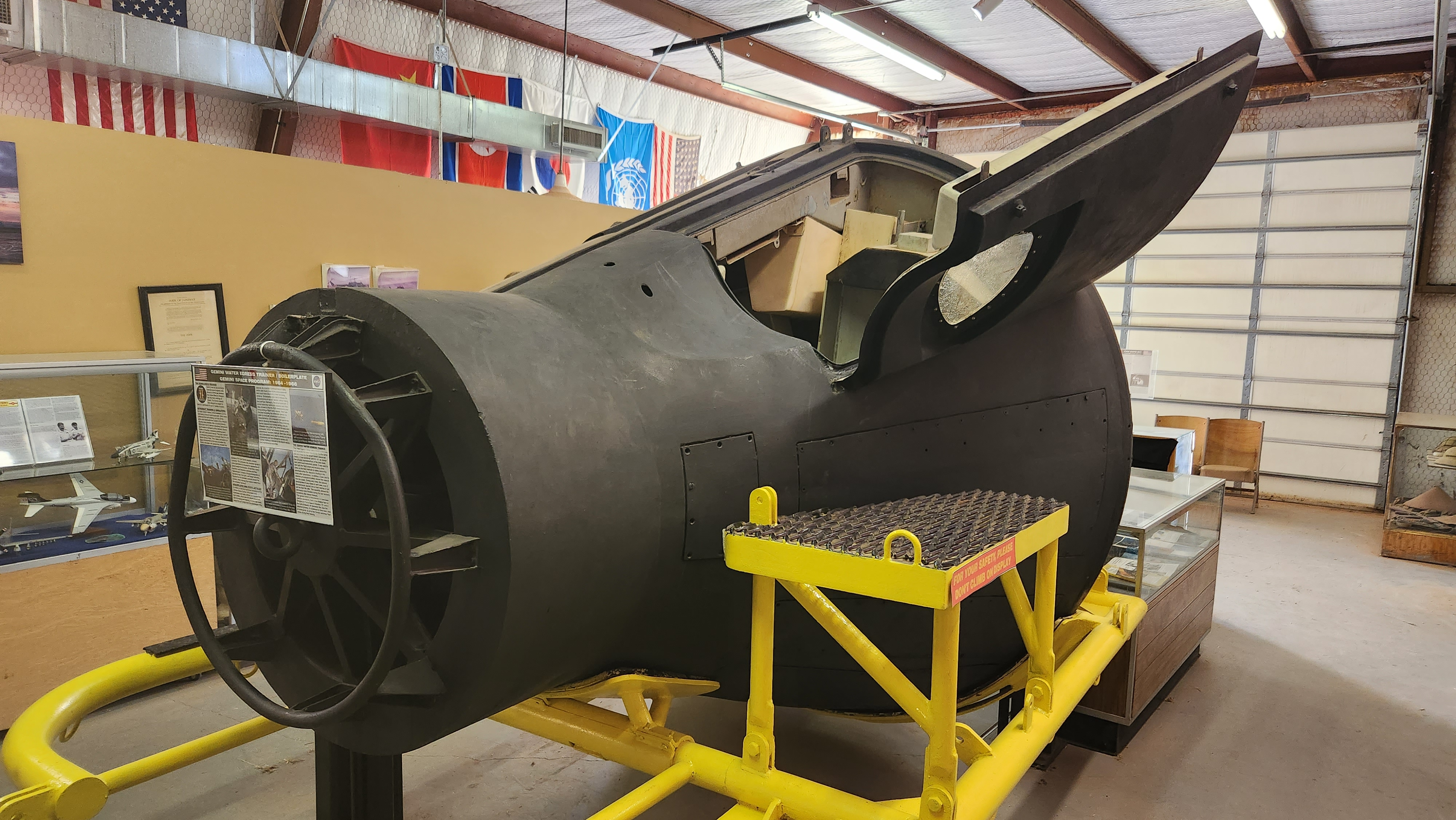
Gemini Training Capsule

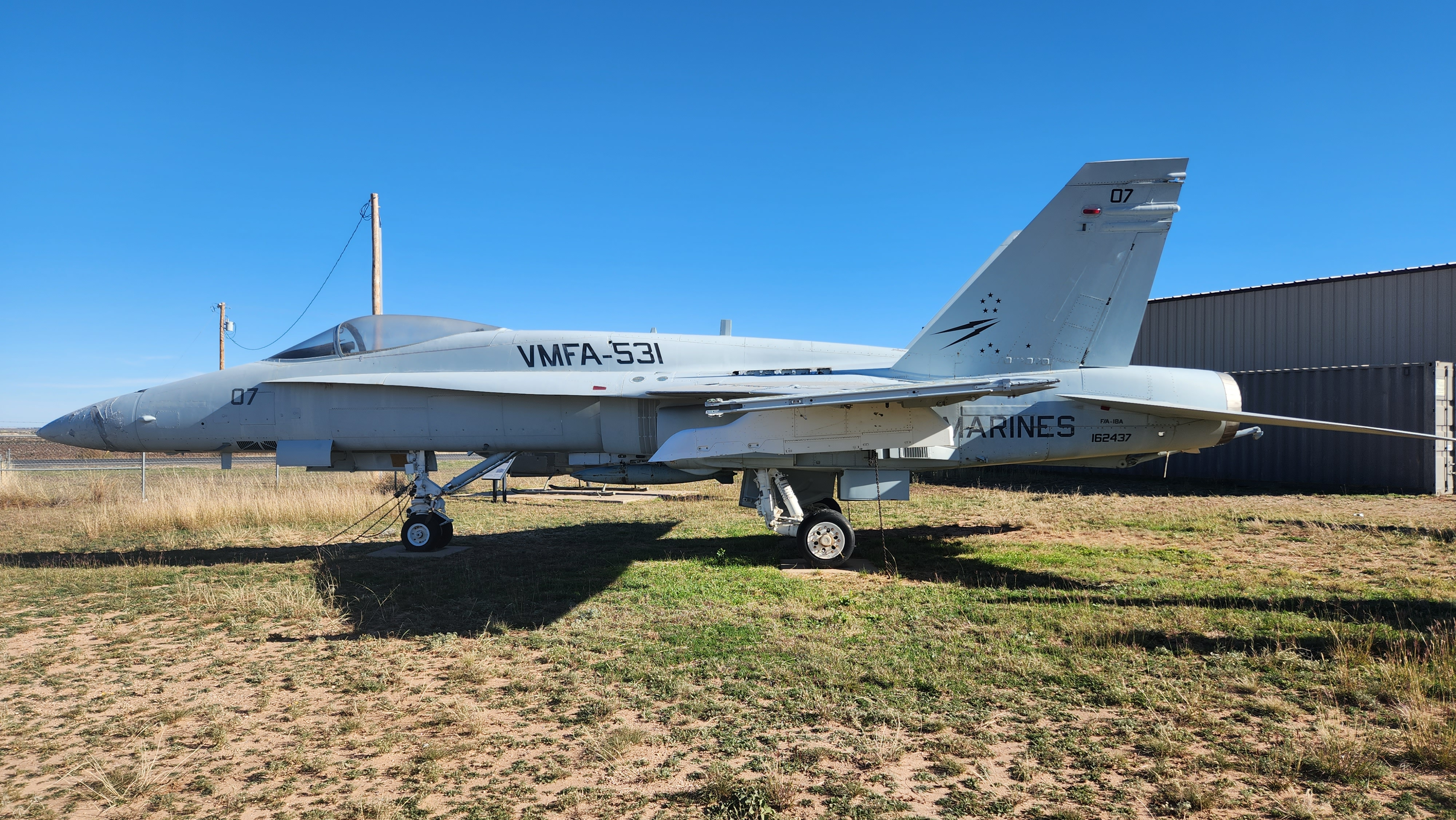
F/A-18A Hornet

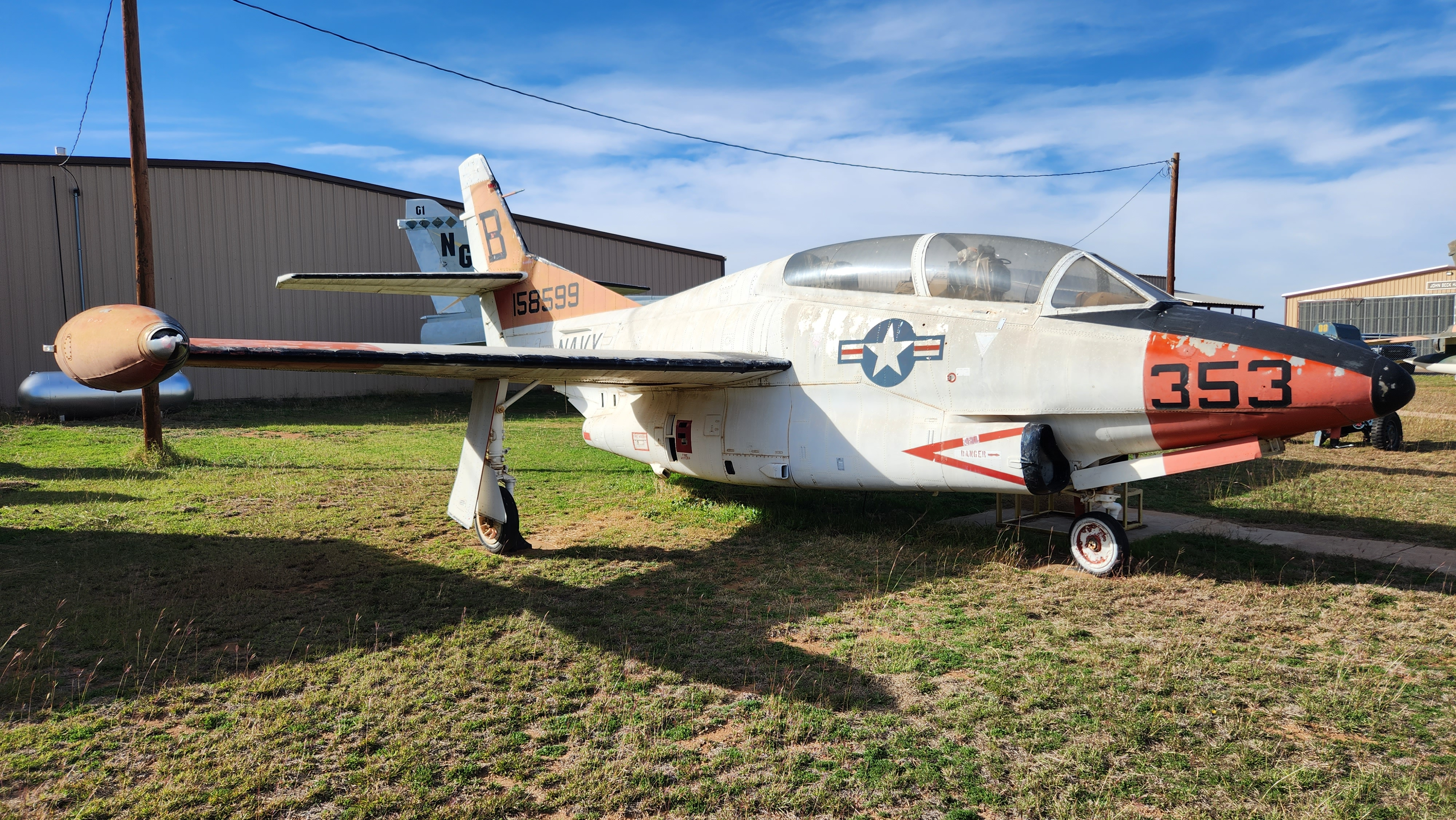
T-2 Buckeye

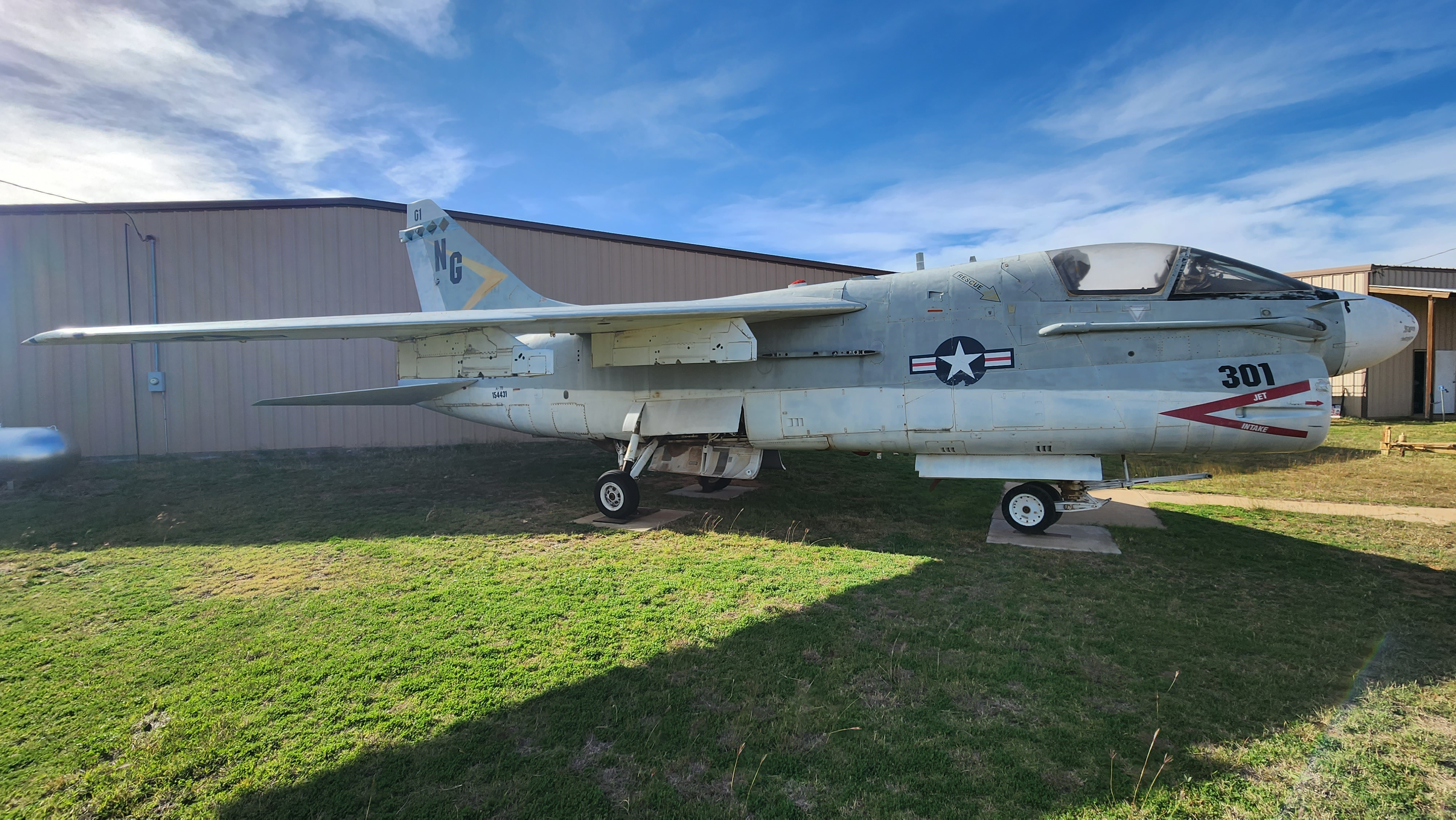
A-7 Corsair

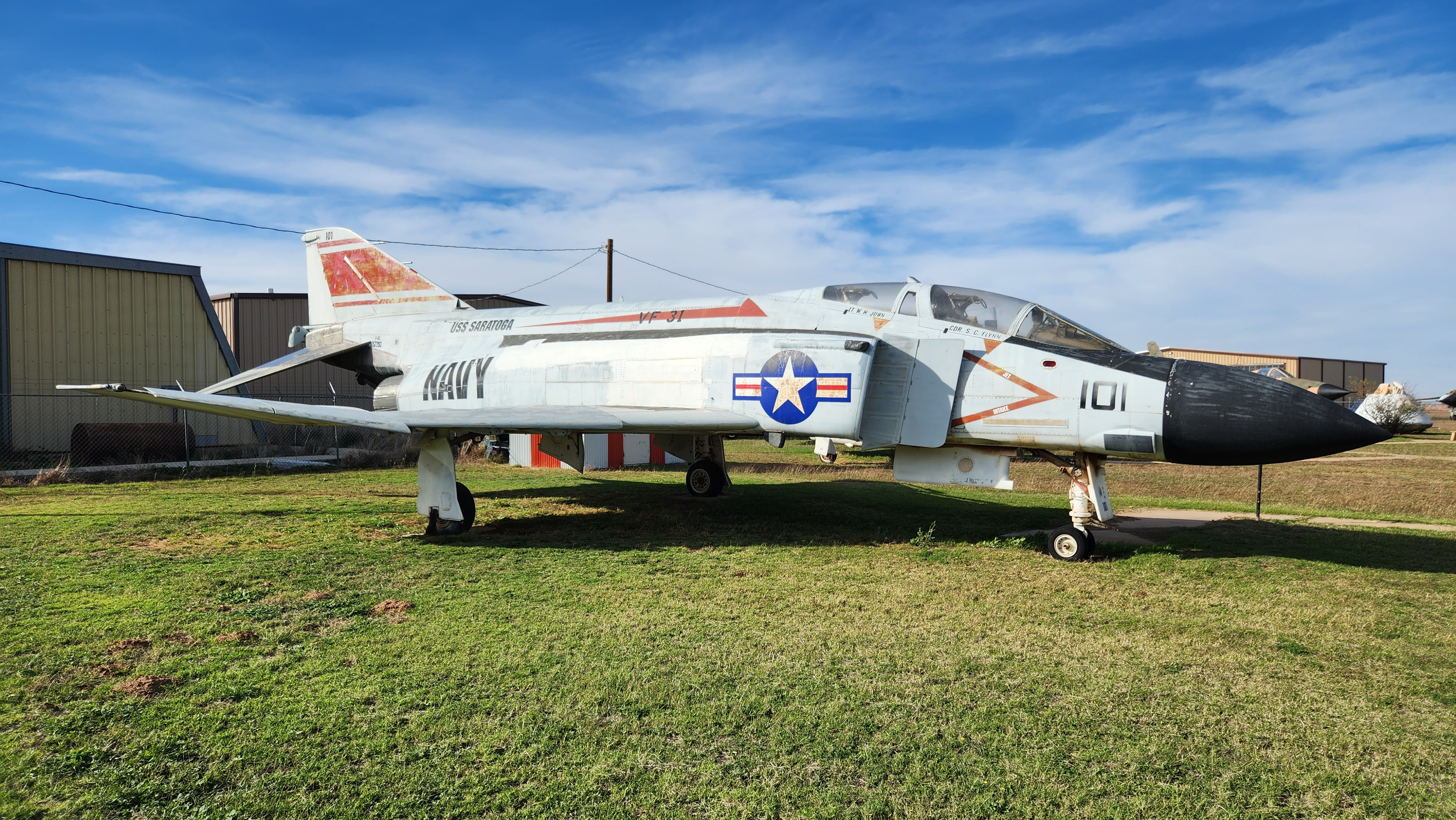
F-4 Phantom

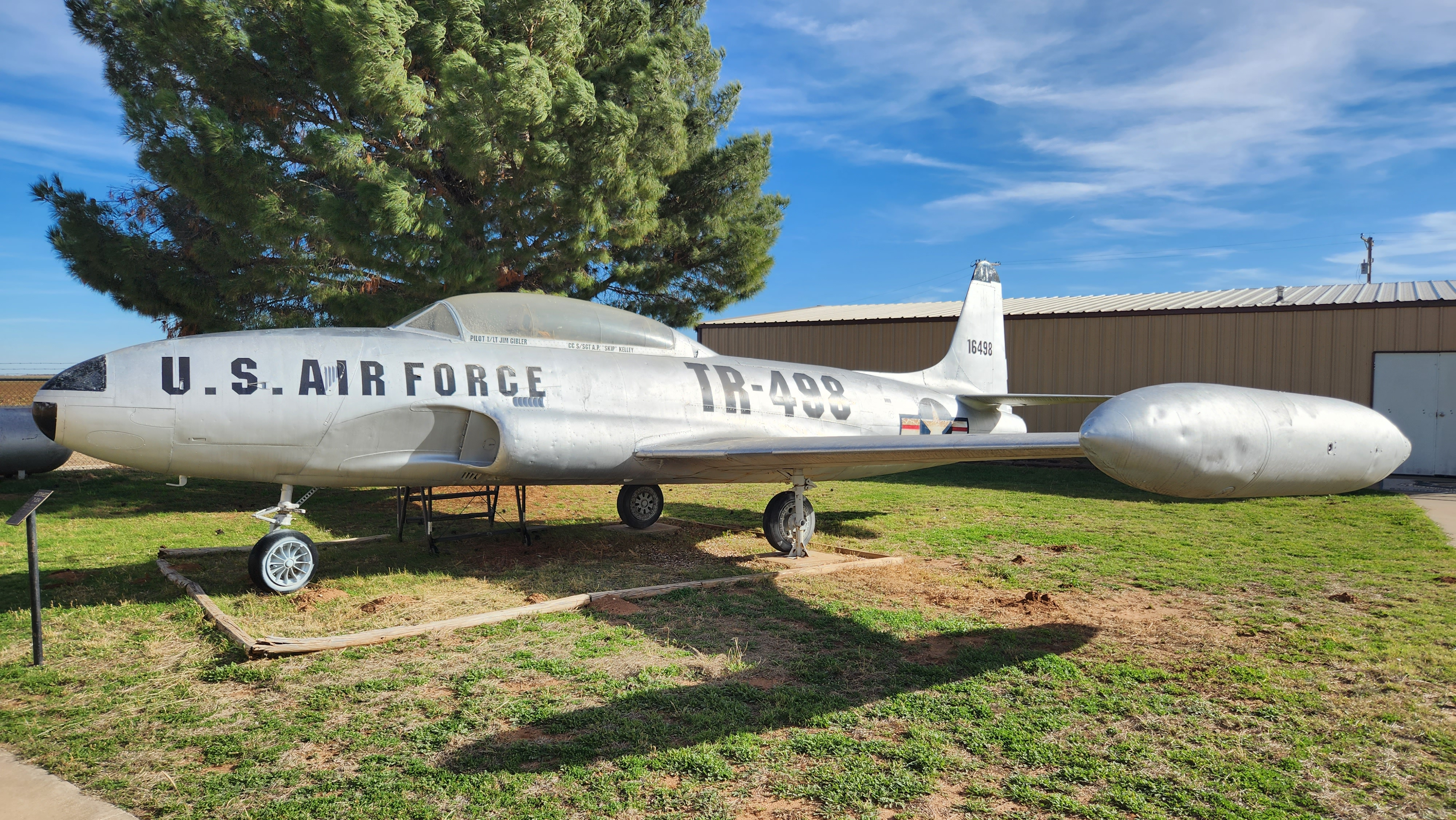
Lockheed T-33

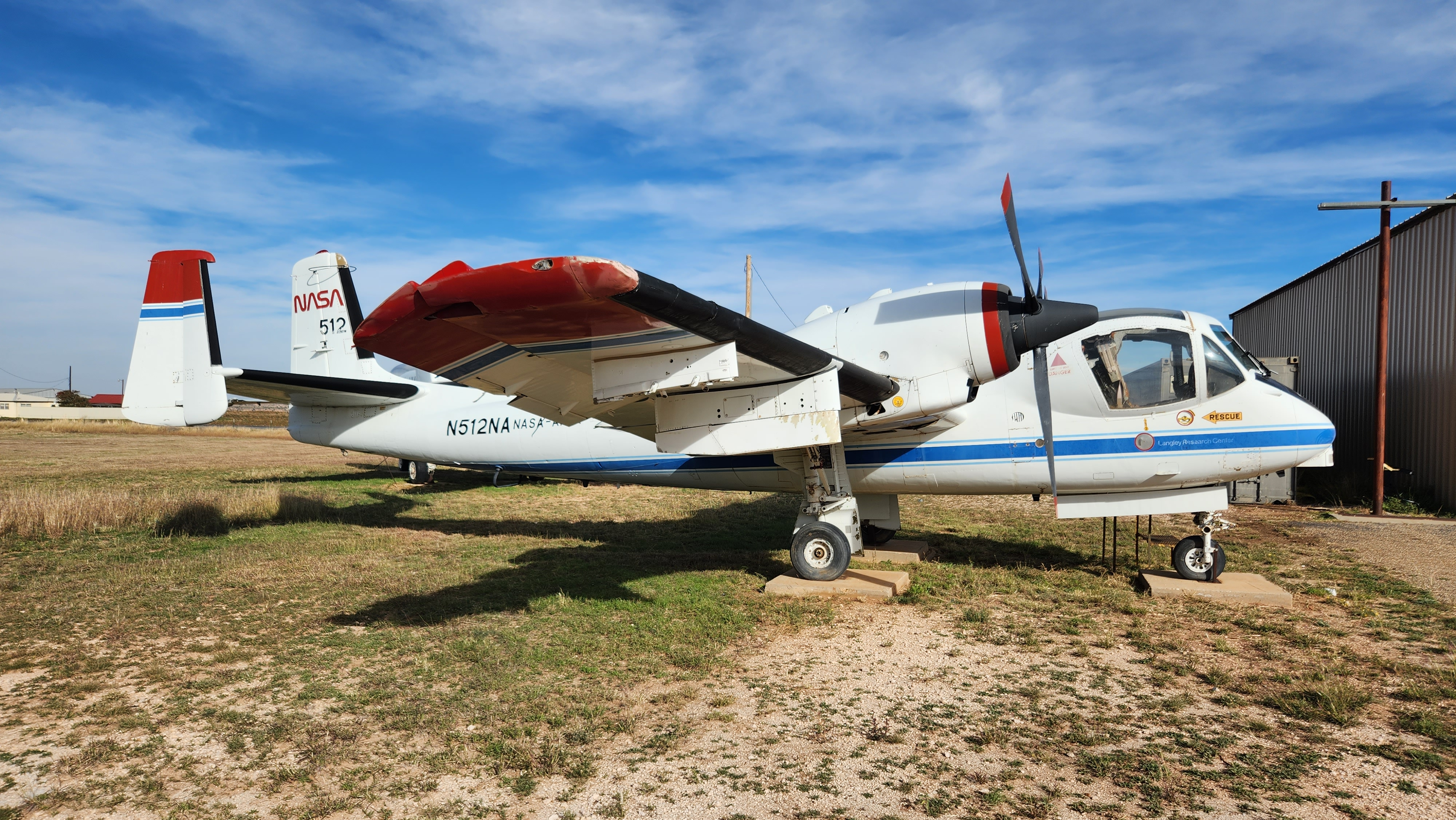
OV-1 Mohawk

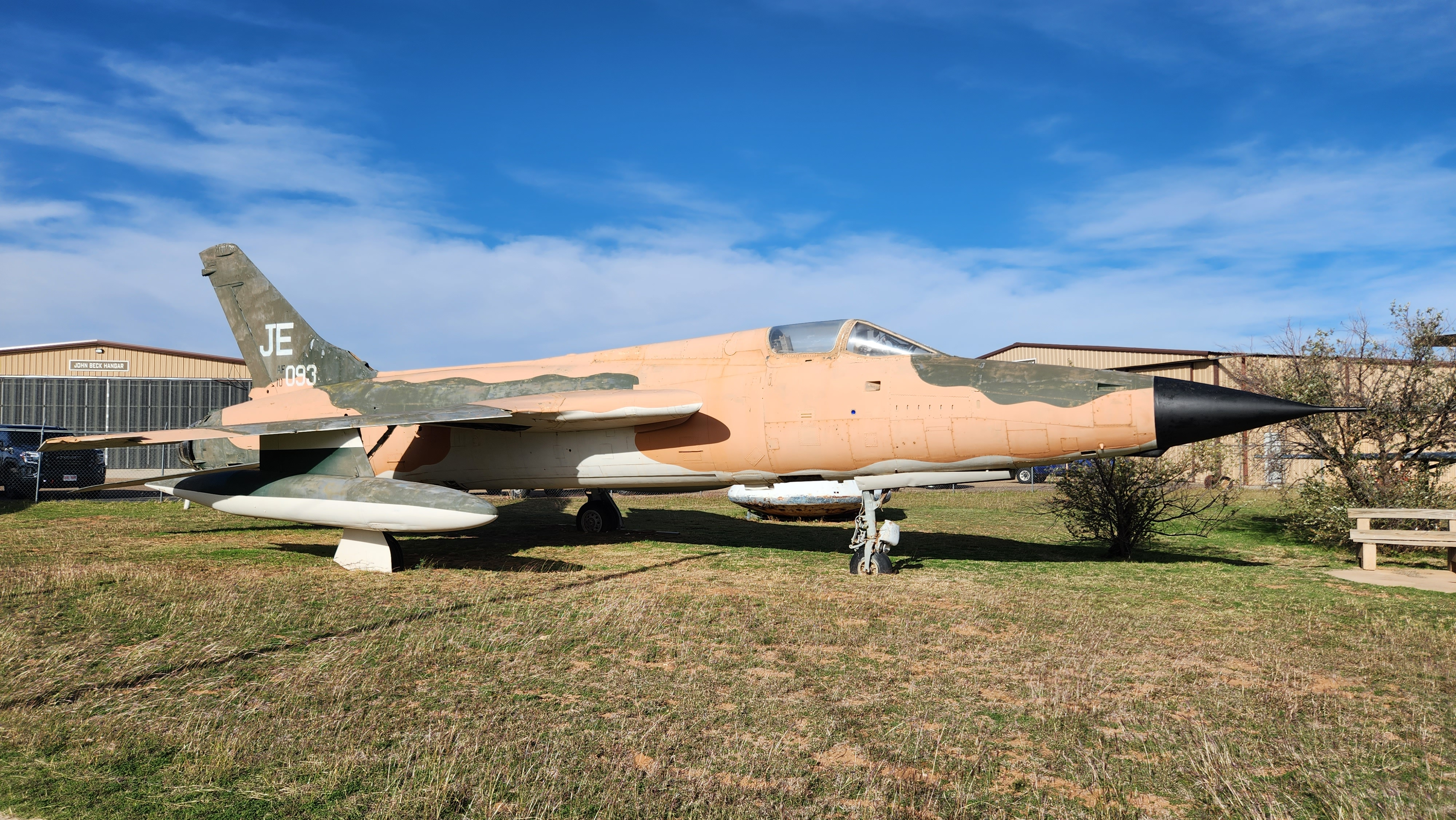
F-105 Thunderchief

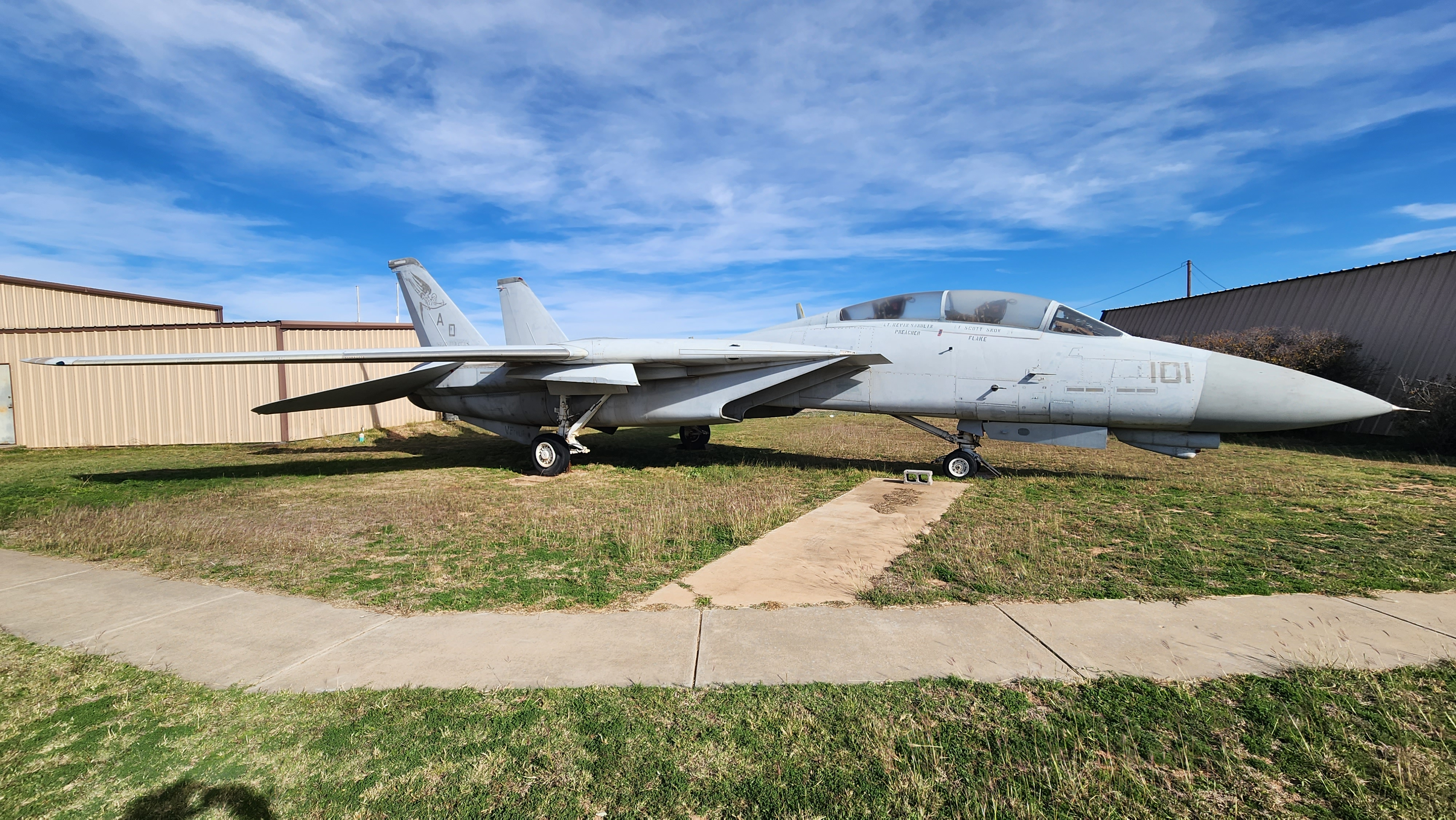
F-14 Tomcat

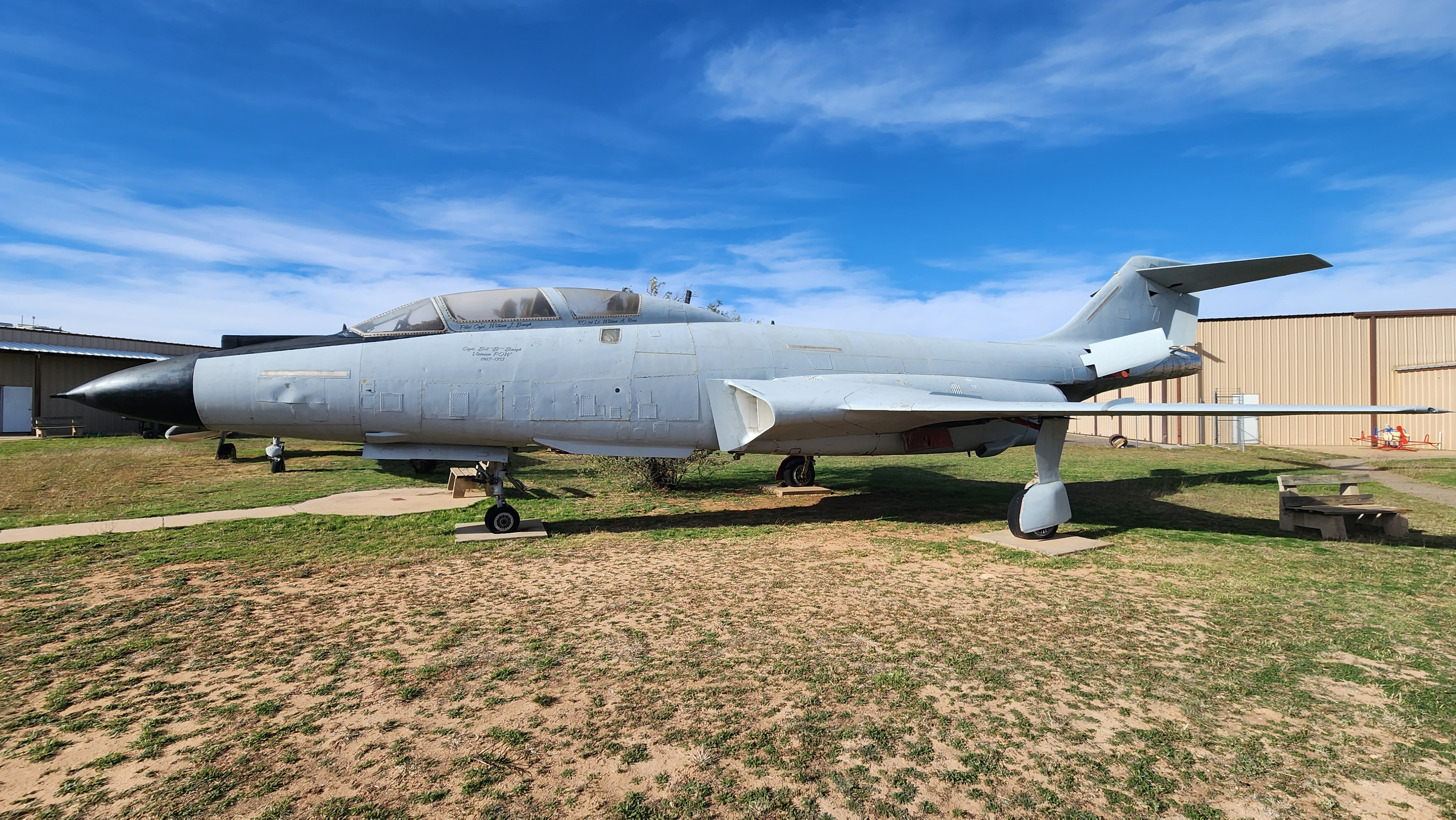
F-101 Voodoo

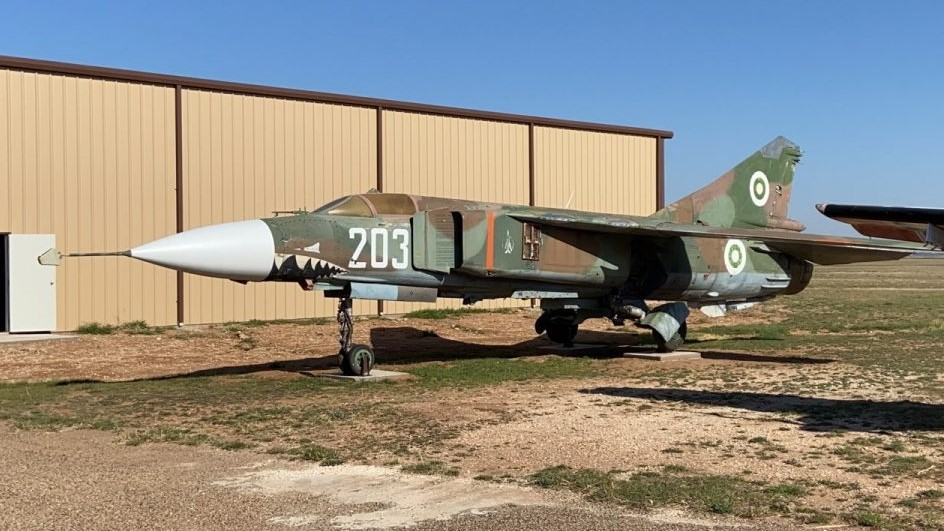
MiG-23

== See also ==
- List of aviation museums
