= Link Aviation Devices =

Aircraft simulator manufacturer

- Formerly: Link Aeronautical Corporation
- Founded: 1929; 97 years ago
- Founder: Edwin Albert Link
- Headquarters: Binghamton, New York, United States
- Parent: General Precision Equipment Corporation (1954-1968); Singer Corporation (1968-1988); CAE Industries (1988-1995); Hughes Electronics Corporation (1995-1998); Raytheon (1998-2000); L3Harris Technologies (2000-2021); CAE Inc. (2021-Present)

Link Aviation Devices was a manufacturer of aircraft simulators. The company is most notable for inventing the Link Trainer, and is credited with starting the flight simulator industry. It is currently a subsidiary of CAE Incorporated.

== History ==
Ed Link founded the company in 1929 in Binghamton, New York, after experimenting with the compressed air used in the products of his father's Link Piano and Organ Company. The company's Link Trainer saw widespread service as an aircraft simulator during and after World War II. As a result, Link Aviation became one of the leading manufacturers of aircraft simulators in the world.

In 1954, Link Aviation was purchased by the General Precision Equipment Corporation. It, in turn, was purchased by Singer Corporation in 1968 and Link became the Simulation Products Division and later the Link Flight Simulation Division. Miles Electronics was purchased by Singer in 1969 and merged into Link. The reincorporated Link Military Simulation Corporation was sold in 1988 to CAE Industries, which became CAE-Link. CAE-Link was purchased by General Motors' Hughes Electronics Corporation in 1995. After only three years, it was bought by Raytheon. Then, in 2000, it was acquired by L-3 Communications and named L-3 Link Simulation & Training. Finally, 26 years after it was sold by the company, it was repurchased by CAE in 2021.

== Products ==
Link produced simulators for a large number of aircraft, including, but not limited to, the A3D, A3J, A-5A, A-7A, AD-5N, AJ 37, B-47, B-57B, B-58, BAC-111, Boeing 707, Boeing 720, Boeing 727, Boeing 747, Bréguet 1150, Buccaneer, C-130B, C-130E, C-130H, C-130K, C-135B, C-141A, CH-47C, DC-8, DC-10, F-4C, F-4D, F4D-1, F-4E, F-4F, F-4J, F-8C, F-8E, F8U, F9F-2, F9F-5, F9F-6, F-86D, F-86L, F-89, F-101B, F-102, F-104A, F-105D, F-106, F-111A, F-111C, F-111E, FB-111, FH-227, Harrier, J 35, Jaguar, KC-130F, KC-135A, L-1011, P2V-5, P2V-7, P-3A, P-3C, P5M, RA-5C, RB-66, RF-4C, RF-4E, S-2E, S2F-1, S2F-3, Sea Vixen, T-2C, T-28B, T-37, T-38, T-39 and UH-1H.

=== Trainers ===
- AVCATT
- Link Trainer
- Lunar Module Simulator – Developed with Grumman for the Apollo program.
- School Trainer – Light airplane trainer. Intended for use in elementary school through college.
- C-11B – Used for training for the Lockheed F-80 Shooting Star.
- E-26 – Flexible gunnery trainer.
- GAT-1 – General aviation trainer.
- GAT-2 – Light twin engine procedural trainer. Flying characteristics resemble the Beechcraft Baron, Cessna 310, and Piper Aztec.
- GAT-3 – Twin jet trainer
- Model 60 – Private and business airplane trainer.
- MB-5 – Flight simulator for the F-102A
- MB-42 – Flight simulator for the F-106A
- ME-1 – Basic jet instrument flight trainer. Developed from the T-37 cockpit.
- P-1 – Constructed from a T-6G cockpit and mounted on a modified C-8 base. A slightly modified version was known as the 1-CA-2 by the U.S. Navy.
- T-4 – Instrument flight trainer for the T-37.
- T-7 – Instrument flight trainer for the T-38.
- Unknown – Trainer for the North American SNJ called the 2-F-10 by the U.S. Navy.

=== Other ===
- A-12 sextant
