= Johnson Sea Link =

Deep-sea scientific research vessel

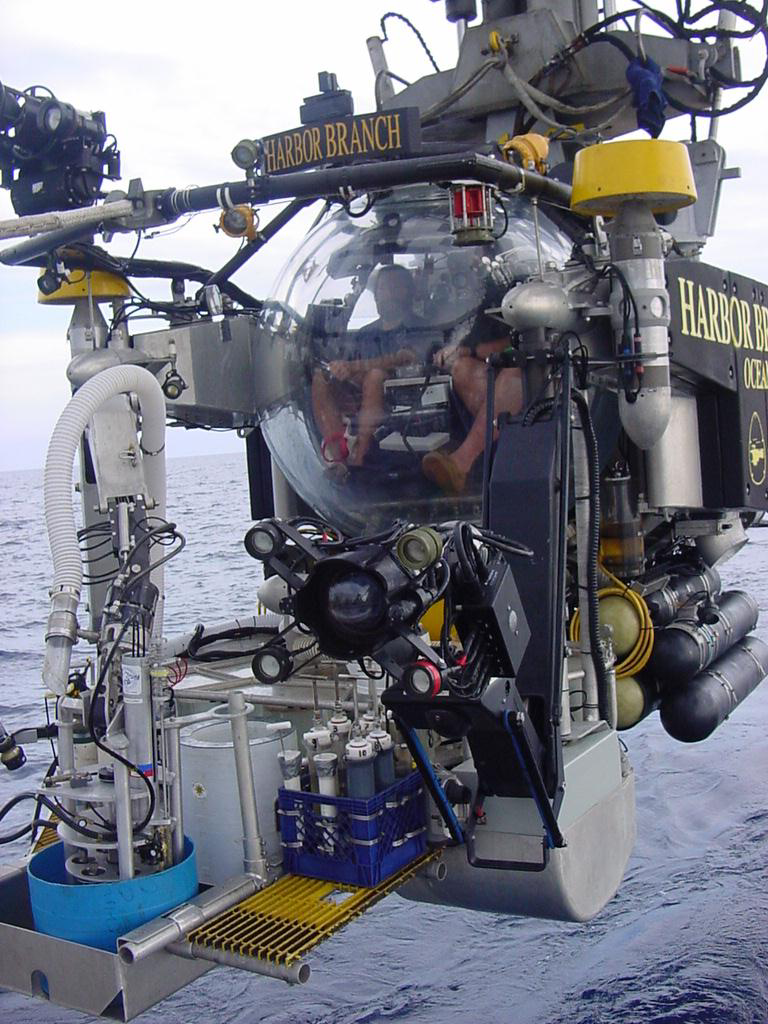
- Johnson Sea Link submersible, ca. 2005

History

United States
- Namesake: John Seward Johnson I, Edwin Albert Link
- Builder: (JSL I) Edwin Albert Link / Alcoa; (JSL II) Harbor Branch Oceanographic Institution
- Launched: (JSL I) 1971; (JSL II) 1975

General characteristics (JSL I, 1974)
- Length: 23 feet (7.0 m)
- Beam: 7.9 feet (2.4 m)
- Draft: 7.1 feet (2.2 m)
- Propulsion: 8 28-VDC electric motors
- Speed: 1.75 knots (3.24 km/h; 2.01 mph)
- Test depth: 3,000 feet (910 m)
- Complement: 1 pilot, 3 observers

Johnson Sea Link was a type of deep-sea scientific research submersible built by Edwin Albert Link. Link built the first submersible, Johnson Sea Link I, in 1971 at the request of his friend Seward Johnson, founder of the Harbor Branch Oceanographic Institute. It was the successor to Link's previous submersible, Deep Diver, which had been determined to be unsafe for use at great depths or in extremely cold temperatures. Johnson Sea Link II was built in 1975.

The Johnson Sea Link submersibles carried a crew of four in two separate compartments. The aft compartment was originally designed for lockout diving, allowing two divers to be compressed to the ambient pressure of the ocean and leave the submersible to work underwater. The forward pilot's compartment was an acrylic sphere with a diameter of 5 feet (1.5 m), providing a panoramic underwater view for the pilot and an observer.

== 1973 accident ==
In 1973, during a seemingly routine dive off Key West, the Johnson Sea Link was trapped for over 24 hours in the wreckage of the destroyer USS Fred T. Berry, which had been sunk to create an artificial reef. Although the submersible was eventually recovered by the rescue vessel A.B. Wood II, two of the four occupants died of carbon dioxide poisoning — 31-year-old Edwin Clayton Link, the son of Edwin Link, and 51-year-old diver Albert Dennison Stover. The submersible's pilot, Archibald "Jock" Menzies, and ichthyologist Robert Meek survived. Over the next two years, Edwin Link designed an unmanned Cabled Observation and Rescue Device (CORD) that could free a trapped submersible.

== Later career ==
In 1975, a second Johnson Sea Link was constructed by the Harbor Branch Oceanographic Institution. In 1977, the JSLs were used to examine the wreckage of the ironclad Civil War battleship, USS Monitor. They were also used in the effort to recover the wreckage of the Space Shuttle Challenger after its destruction in 1986. One of the submersibles discovered the solid rocket booster with the faulty seal that had caused the shuttle to explode. The submersible and its research program were featured in a Voice of America story in 2005. In 2010, Harbor Branch sold the Seward Johnson, the ship outfitted to deploy the submersibles, and laid off the submersibles' crew and support staff in July 2011, ending their operation.

== In media ==
- "Deep Sea Secrets," a 1992 episode of the PBS television series Return to the Sea, profiles Johnson Sea Link and Seward Johnson during operations off Cape Hatteras, North Carolina.
