= City of Slaton/Larry T Neal Memorial Airport =

Airport near Slaton, Texas

City of Slaton/Larry T. Neal Memorial Airport
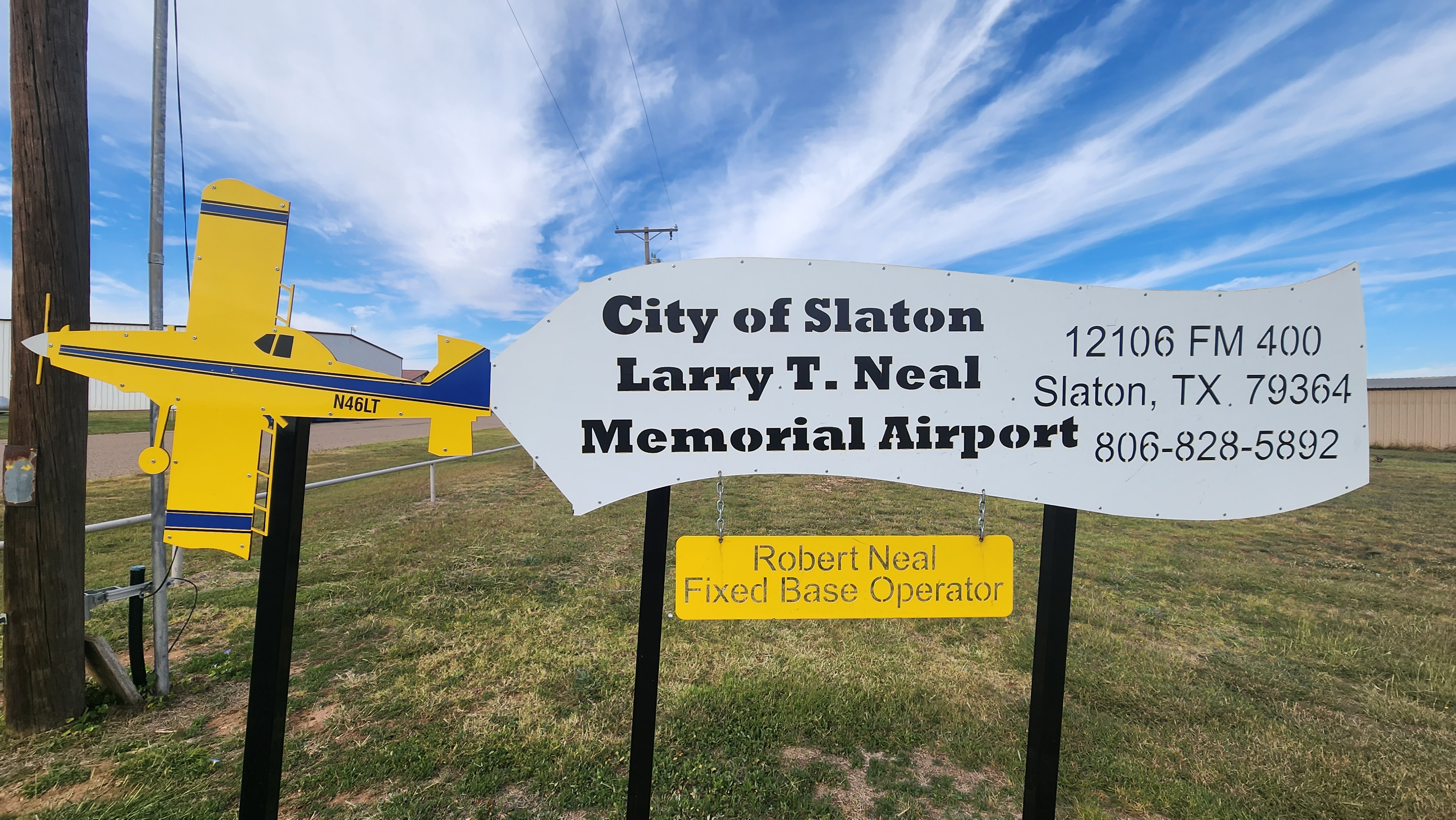
- IATA: none; ICAO: KF49; FAA LID: F49

Summary
- Airport type: Public
- Owner: City of Slaton
- Operator: Neal Aircraft
- Serves: Slaton, Texas
- Location: 12106 FM 400, Slaton, TX 79364
- Elevation AMSL: 3,126 ft (953 m)
- Coordinates: 33°29′06″N 101°39′42″W

Map
- Location within Texas

Runways
Direction	Length		Surface
Direction	ft	m	Surface
18/36	4,244	1,294	Asphalt

City of Slaton/Larry T. Neal Memorial Airport (formerly Slaton Municipal Airport) is a General Aviation airport located 3.4 mi (5.5 km) north of Slaton, Texas.

== Facilities ==
Slaton Airport has one asphalt runway (18–36) which is 4,244 ft (1,294 m) long and 75 ft (23 m) wide and sits at an elevation of 3,126 ft (953 m) above mean sea level. The airport previously had a second turf runway (8-26) but it was closed permanently due to the rough surface. The airport had 6,200 aircraft operations in one year. There are nineteen aircraft based on the airport and has a development estimate of $2,017,000. There are two FAA approved instrument approaches to the airport. One is an Area Navigation (RNAV) GPS approach to runway 18 and another RNAV approach to runway 36. The Texas Air Museum, Caprock Chapter is located on the North end of the airport.

== See also ==
- List of airports in Texas
