= Deep Diver =

Research submersible

History
- Name: Perry-Link #4, Deep Diver
- Builder: Perry Submarine Builders
- Launched: January 1966
- Status: Decommissioned, donated to Smithsonian Institution

General characteristics
- Length: 22 feet (6.7 m)
- Beam: 5 feet (1.5 m)
- Draft: 6.5 feet (2.0 m)
- Propulsion: 48-amp motor
- Speed: 3 knots/0.5 hr
- Test depth: 1,350 feet (410 m)
- Complement: 1 pilot and 3 observers

Deep Diver was the name of a deep-sea scientific research submersible designed by Edwin Albert Link. Deep Diver was the first small submersible designed for lockout diving, allowing divers to leave and enter the craft while underwater. It was first launched in January 1966.

== Construction and design ==
Deep Diver was initially known as the Perry-Link #4 and was built in Riviera Beach, Florida by the Perry Submarine Company. Its name was subsequently changed to Deep Diver and its ownership transferred to Link's company, Ocean Systems, Inc. The submersible contained two compartments: a divers' compartment, developed from Link's earlier work with his Submersible Decompression Chamber (SDC), which allowed divers to be compressed to the ambient pressure of the ocean and leave the submersible to work underwater, and a pilots' compartment which remained at surface pressure, allowing the pilot and an observer to make dives without undergoing decompression. The two compartments were connected by a hatch which could be sealed off. Deep Diver was the first modern diver lock-out submersible.

Deep Diver was 22 feet (6.7 m) long and 8.5 feet (2.6 m) tall. It weighed 8.25 tons dry. It allowed one pilot and three observers to dive for a total of 32 man-hours to a depth limit of 1,350 feet (410 m). Divers could lock-out through a bottom hatch to a maximum depth of 1,250 feet (380 m). Both the pilot' and divers' compartments were made of 0.5-inch (13 mm) rolled and welded T1 steel, 54 inches (1,400 mm) tall. Deep Diver's main hatch was 23 inches (580 mm) in diameter. The submersible featured no manipulators. It had twenty-one acrylic plastic viewports. The ballast and trim tanks provided 845 pounds (383 kg) and 676 pounds (307 kg) of positive buoyancy, respectively, when emptied. A large battery pod containing four battery banks could be jettisoned in an emergency, providing an additional 1,500 pounds (680 kg) of buoyancy.

== Undersea missions ==
Deep Diver carried out many scientific missions in 1967 and 1968 operated from Link's underwater research vessel, Sea Diver. These included a 430-foot (130 m) lockout dive in 1967 (at the same location as the 1964 Man in Sea dive by Robert Sténuit and Jon Lindbergh) and a 700-foot (210 m) lockout dive near Great Stirrup Cay in 1968. Dr. Joseph B. MacInnis participated in both of these dives as an observer in Deep Diver's forward chamber. In September 1967, Deep Diver carried out a classified Ocean Systems mission on the Grand Banks south of Newfoundland. A cable plow, rumored to be used for burying a strategic communications cable, had been lost in 400 feet (120 m) of water. Two Navy divers had already died trying to recover it. A crew of four Ocean Systems personnel, including MacInnis, unsuccessfully attempted to recover the cable plow using the submersible. The mission was called off due to rising winds, and Deep Diver was barely brought safely back aboard the Canadian Coast Guard vessel CCGS John Cabot.

== Decommissioning ==
Later in 1968, after Deep Diver had been requisitioned by the United States Navy to help search for the lost submarine USS Scorpion, the Bureau of Ships determined that Deep Diver was unsafe for use at great depths or in extremely cold temperatures because of the substitution of the wrong kind of steel, which became brittle in cold water, in some parts of the sub. Link proceeded to design a new lockout sub with a distinctive acrylic bubble as the forward pilot/observer compartment. In January 1971 the new sub was launched and commissioned to the Smithsonian Institution. It was named the Johnson Sea Link after its donors, Link and his friend John Seward Johnson I. Deep Diver was decommissioned and donated to the Smithsonian Institution. It was placed on display at the Marine Sciences Center in Fort Pierce, Florida.
