= Link Piano and Organ Company =

American musical instrument manufacturer

The Link Piano and Organ Company was an American manufacturer of pianos, orchestrions, fotoplayers, and theatre pipe organs.

During the early 1900s, George T. Link was managing a small firm named Shaft Brothers Piano Company, which manufactured and sold pianos to the Automatic Musical Company of Binghamton, New York. When the Automatic Musical Company went bankrupt about a decade later, George's son, Edwin A. Link, Sr., became employed by the creditors to go to Binghamton and operate the company. The Links, with their two sons, George and Edwin Jr., moved from Huntington, Indiana to Binghamton that same year. Edwin Sr. was successful at turning the company around, and later purchased the company from the creditors, then changed the name to the Link Piano Company.

For some time, the business primarily focused on making player pianos and orchestrions.

The Star Theater, which was the oldest movie house in Binghamton, was the first to use the Link automatic piano to provide music for its silent films. As larger and more elaborate movie theatres were built, and more versatile organs were demanded, the company began manufacturing theatre pipe organs. At this time, the company's name was expanded to the Link Piano and Organ Company.

The company produced about 130 theatre organs, before going out of business around 1932.

Ed Link, Jr used the bellows technology from the automatic piano in his Link Trainer flight simulators.
