= Link Trainer =

Early flight simulator

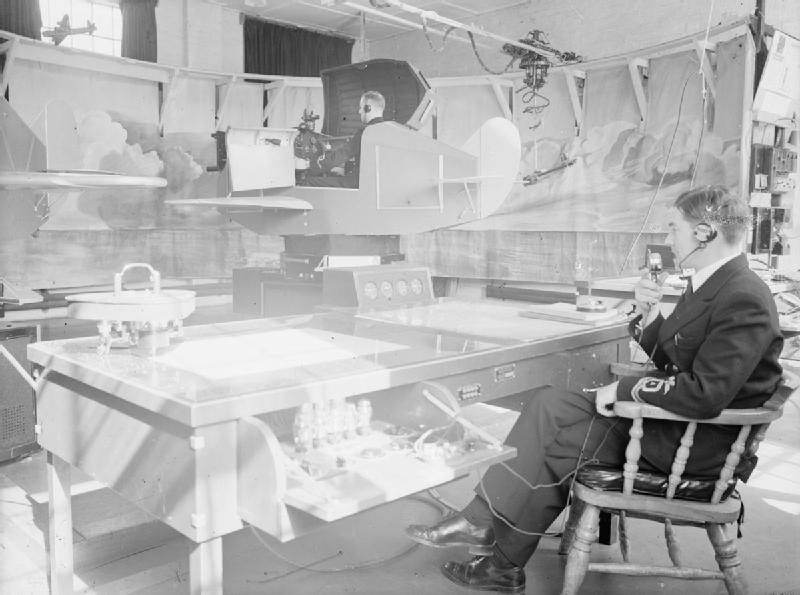
Link trainer in use at a British Fleet Air Arm station in 1943

The term Link Trainer, also known as the "Blue box" and "Pilot Trainer", is commonly used to refer to a series of flight simulators produced between the early 1930s and early 1950s by Link Aviation Devices, founded and headed by Ed Link, based on technology he pioneered in 1929 at his family's business in Binghamton, New York. During World War II, they were used as a key pilot training aid by almost every combatant nation.

The original Link Trainer was created in 1929 out of the need for a safe way to teach new pilots how to fly by instruments. Ed Link used his knowledge of pumps, valves and bellows gained at his father's Link Piano and Organ Company to create a flight simulator that responded to the pilot's controls and gave an accurate reading on the included instruments. More than 500,000 US pilots were trained on Link simulators, as were pilots of nations as diverse as Australia, Canada, Germany, New Zealand, United Kingdom, Israel, Japan, Pakistan, and the USSR. Following WWII, Air Marshal Robert Leckie (wartime RAF Chief of Staff) said "The Luftwaffe met its Waterloo on all the training fields of the free world where there was a battery of Link Trainers".

The Link Flight Trainer has been designated as a Historic Mechanical Engineering Landmark by the American Society of Mechanical Engineers. The Link Company, now the Link Simulation & Training division of CAE USA Defense & Security CAE Inc., continues to make aerospace simulators.

== History ==
=== Origins ===
Edwin Link had developed a passion for flying in his boyhood years, but was not able to afford the high cost of flying lessons. So, upon leaving school in 1927, he started developing a simulator. The project took him 18 months. His first pilot trainer, which debuted in 1929, resembled an overgrown toy airplane from the outside, with short wooden wings and fuselage mounted on a universal joint. Organ bellows from the Link organ factory, the business his family owned and operated in Binghamton, New York, driven by an electric pump, made the trainer pitch and roll as the pilot worked the controls.

Link's first military sales came as a result of the Air Mail scandal, when the Army Air Corps took over carriage of U.S. Air Mail. Twelve pilots were killed in a 78-day period due to their unfamiliarity with Instrument Flying Conditions. The large scale loss of life prompted the Air Corps to look at a number of solutions, including Link's pilot trainer. The Air Corps was given a stark demonstration of the potential of instrument training when, in 1934, Link flew in to a meeting in conditions of fog that the Air Corps evaluation team regarded as unflyable. As a result, the Air Corps ordered the first six pilot trainers on 23 June 1934 for $3,500 each. In 1936, the more advanced Model C was introduced.

American Airlines became the first commercial airline to purchase a Link trainer in 1937. Prior to World War II, Link trainers were also sold to the U.S. Navy, Civil Aeronautics Administration, Germany, Japan, England, Russia, France, and Canada.

=== World War II ===
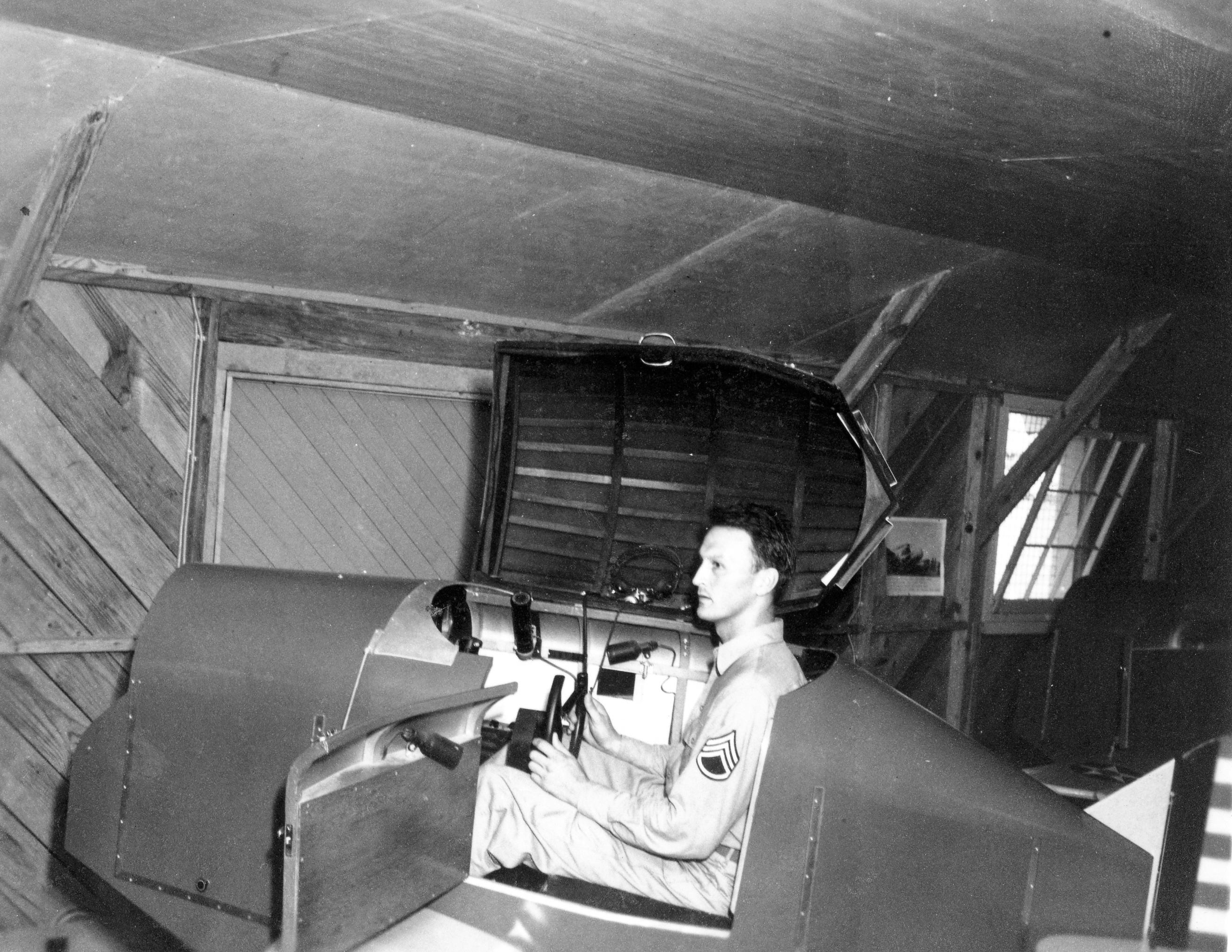
Link Trainer at Freeman Field, Seymour, Indiana. Freeman Field was a US Army Air Force field in World War II.

Link and his company had struggled through the Depression years, but after gaining Air Corps interest the business expanded rapidly and during World War II, the AN-T-18 Basic Instrument Trainer, known to tens of thousands of fledgling pilots as the "Blue Box" (although it was painted in different colors in other countries), was standard equipment at every air training school in the United States and Allied nations. During the war years, Link produced over 10,000 Blue Boxes, turning one out every 45 minutes.

During World War II, Link trainers were sometimes run by women.

== Link Trainer models ==
Several models of Link Trainers were sold in a period ranging from 1934 through to the late 1950s. These trainers kept pace with the increased instrumentation and flight dynamics of aircraft of their period, but retained the electrical and pneumatic design fundamentals pioneered in the first Link.

Trainers built from 1934 up to the early 1940s had a color scheme that featured a bright blue fuselage and yellow wings and tail sections. These wings and tail sections had control surfaces that actually moved in response to the pilot's movement of the rudder and stick. However, many trainers built during mid to late World War II did not have these wings and tail sections due to material shortages and critical manufacturing times.

=== Pilot Maker ===
The Pilot Maker was Link's first model. It was an evolution of his 1929 prototype and was used in Mr. Link's Link Flying School and later by other flying schools. During the Depression years versions of the Pilot Maker were also sold to amusement parks. In fact, his patent (US1825462 A) for the Pilot Maker was titled Combination Training Device for Student Aviators and Entertainment Apparatus.

=== AN-T-18 ===
The most prolific version of the Link Trainer was the AN-T-18 (Army Navy Trainer model 18), which was a slightly enhanced version of Link's C3 model. This model was also produced in Canada for both the Royal Canadian Air Force and the Royal Air Force with a somewhat modified instrument panel, where its model designation was D2. It was used by many countries for pilot training before and during the Second World War, especially in the British Commonwealth Air Training Plan.

The AN-T-18 featured rotation through all three axes, effectively simulated all flight instruments, and modeled common conditions such as pre-stall buffet, overspeed of the retractable undercarriage, and spinning. It was fitted with a removable opaque canopy, which could be used to simulate blind flying, and was particularly useful for instrument and navigation training.

==== AN-T-18 design and construction ====
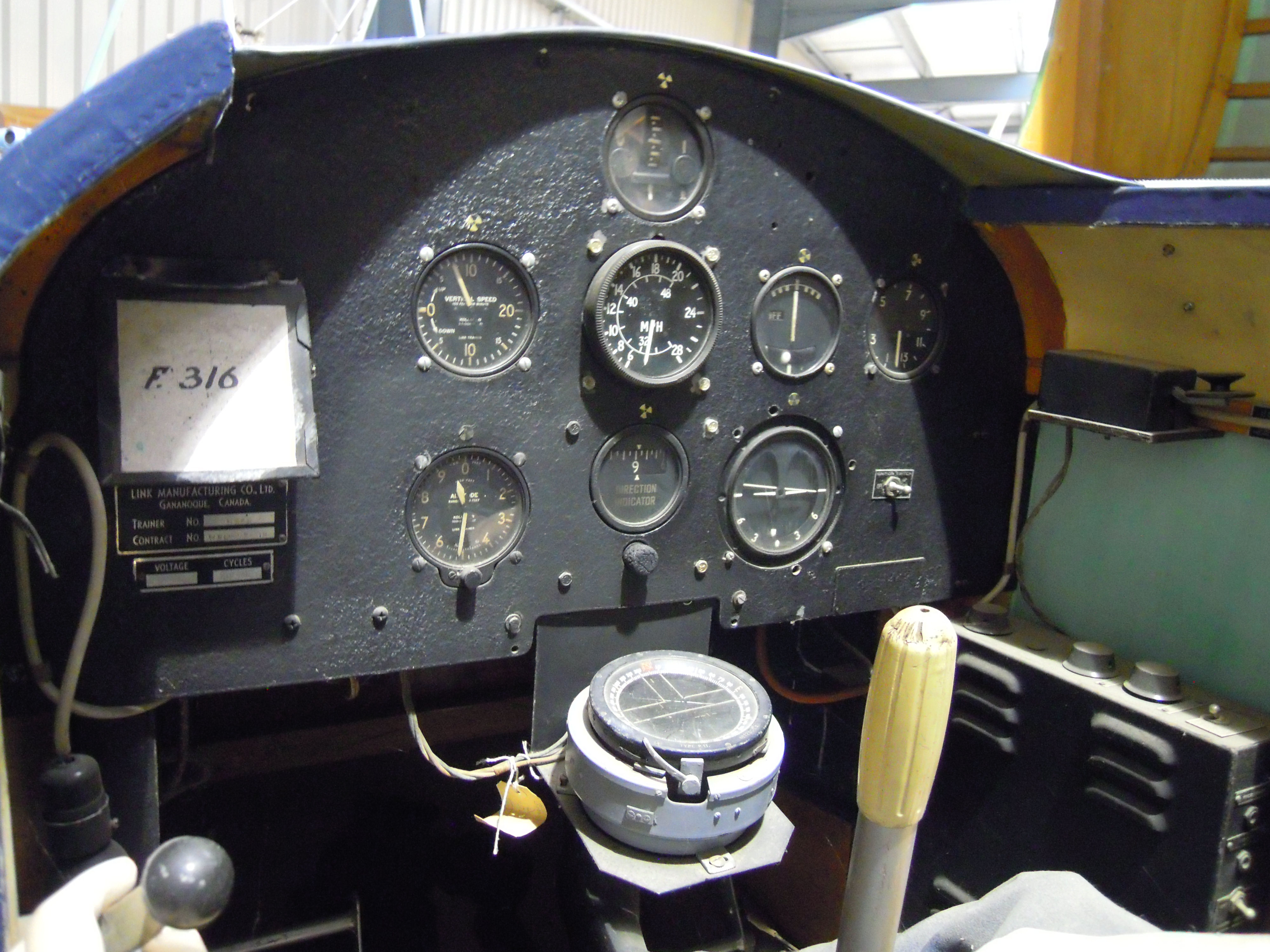
The instrument panel of the Link Trainer at the Shuttleworth Collection in the UK

The AN-T-18 consists of two main components:

The first major component is the trainer, which consists of a wooden box approximating the shape of a fuselage and cockpit, connected via a universal joint to a base. Inside the cockpit is a single pilot's seat, primary and secondary aircraft controls, and a full suite of flight instruments. The base contains several complicated sets of air-driven bellows to create three-axis movement, a vacuum pump that drives both the bellows and provides input through even more bellows and numerous needle valves (these worked by linkages to the pilot's controls) to special negative-pressure aircraft instruments that simulate airspeed, height, rate of climb/descent and "engine" rpm readings. There is also conventional gyro turn & slip and directional-indicator gauge. A Telegon Oscillator (cabinet mounted inside the octagon's base) houses a 800cps(Hz) low-frequency valve oscillator with a 25W push-pull amplifier to produce 85 volts of sinewave output to power a unique instrument-repeater system. This electrical duplicating scheme sends similarly induced voltages from the trainer's airspeed, altimeter and vertical speed, vacuum-driven "converters" to both the pilot and copy instruments on the instructor's console. The ASI, Altimeter and VSI instruments are actually sensitive a.c. voltmeters calibrated in conventional aircraft markings.

The second major component, the external instructor's desk, consists of a large map table; the duplicate display of the pilot's main flight instruments; and the Automatic Recorder, a motorized ink marker also known as "the crab". The crab is driven by the Wind Drift computer and moves across the glass surface of the map table, plotting the pilot's track. The desk includes circuits for the pilot and instructor to communicate with each other via headphones and hand-held microphones, and controls for the instructor to alter wind direction and speed.

The AN-T-18 has three main sets of bellows. One set of four bellows (fore and aft and both sides of the cockpit) controls movement about the pitch and roll axes. A very complicated set of bellows at the front of the fuselage controls movement about the yaw axis. This Turning Motor is a complex set of 10 bellows, two crank shafts and various gears and pulleys derived from early player piano motors. The Turning Motor can rotate the entire fuselage through 360-degree circles at variable rates of speed. A set of electrical slip ring contacts in the lower base compartment supplies electrical continuity between the fixed base and the movable fuselage.

The third set of bellows simulates vibration, such as stall buffet. Both the trainer and the instructor's station are powered from standard 110VAC/240VAC power outlets via a transformer, with the bulk of internal wiring being low voltage. Simulator logic including wind drift computations is all analog and is based around vacuum tube/valves.

== Variants ==
Pilot Maker
First production model. Development of 1929 prototype.

=== "Blue Box" ===
A
Procedural trainer that included only basic instruments.
C
Known as the C-2 by the United States Army Air Forces. Added 10 advanced instruments, radio communication with an instructor, cockpit lights, and automatic course recording.
C-2
Commercial version not used by the military.
C-3
Used by the United States Army Air Forces. Includes automatic wind drift device and radio simulator.
C-5
Used by the United States Army Air Forces. Includes automatic wind drift device and actual radio equipment.
C-8
Developed in 1945 from the North American T-6 Texan with more instrumentation than previous versions. Known as the 1-CA-1 by the U.S. Navy and the Model F.
D
Export version.
D-1
Used by the British military.
D-2
Used by the British military. Manufactured in Canada.
D4
Used by the British military. Built under license in England by Air Trainers Ltd of Aylesbury.
E
Commercial version not used by the military.
E Sp.
Slight modification for Army and Navy use. Known as the C-4 by the United States Army Air Forces.
E-1
Used by the United States Army Air Forces.
E-2
Used by the United States Army Air Forces.
AN-2550-1
Developed from the C-3, it added landing gear, propeller pitch and flap controls. Also known as the AN-T-18.

=== Postwar ===
D4 Mk II
Modification of the D4 to represent the BAC Jet Provost.
Model 45
Advanced version with instruments similar to T-6.

== Surviving trainers ==
As of 2022, many Link Trainers survive and are exhibited.

== See also ==
- Aviation safety
- Bárány chair
- Flight simulator
- List of Historic Mechanical Engineering Landmarks
- Greater Binghamton Airport Edwin A. Link Field
