= Edwin Albert Link =

American inventor and underwater diver (1904–1981)

- Edwin A. Link
- Born: July 26, 1904; Huntington, Indiana
- Died: September 7, 1981 (aged 77); Binghamton, New York, United States
- Education: Binghamton Central High School
- Occupations: Industrialist, entrepreneur
- Known for: Inventor of flight simulator; underwater archeologist; ocean engineer
- Spouse: Marion Clayton Link
- Children: William Martin Link, Edwin Clayton Link
- Parent(s): Edwin A. Link, Sr., Katherine Martin Link

Edwin Albert Link (July 26, 1904 – September 7, 1981) was an American inventor, entrepreneur and pioneer in aviation, underwater archaeology, and submersibles. He invented the flight simulator, which was called the "Blue Box" or "Link Trainer". It was commercialized in 1929, starting a now multibillion-dollar industry. In total, he obtained more than 27 patents for aeronautics, navigation and oceanographic equipment.

== Early life ==
Edwin Link was born in Huntington, Indiana, in 1904, the son of Edwin A. Link Sr. and Katherine (Martin) Link. In 1910, he moved with his family to Binghamton, New York.

== Aviation ==
=== Aviator ===
He took his first flying lesson in 1920. In 1927, he obtained the first Cessna airplane ever delivered and eked out a living by barnstorming, charter flying and giving lessons.

As a young man, Edwin Link used apparatus from his father's automatic piano and organ factory (of the Link Piano and Organ Company) to produce an advertising airplane. A punched roll and pneumatic system from a player piano controlled sequential lights on the lower surfaces of the wings to spell out messages like "ENDICOTT-JOHNSON SHOES". To attract more attention, he added a set of small but loud organ pipes, also controlled by the roll.

=== Flight simulator ===
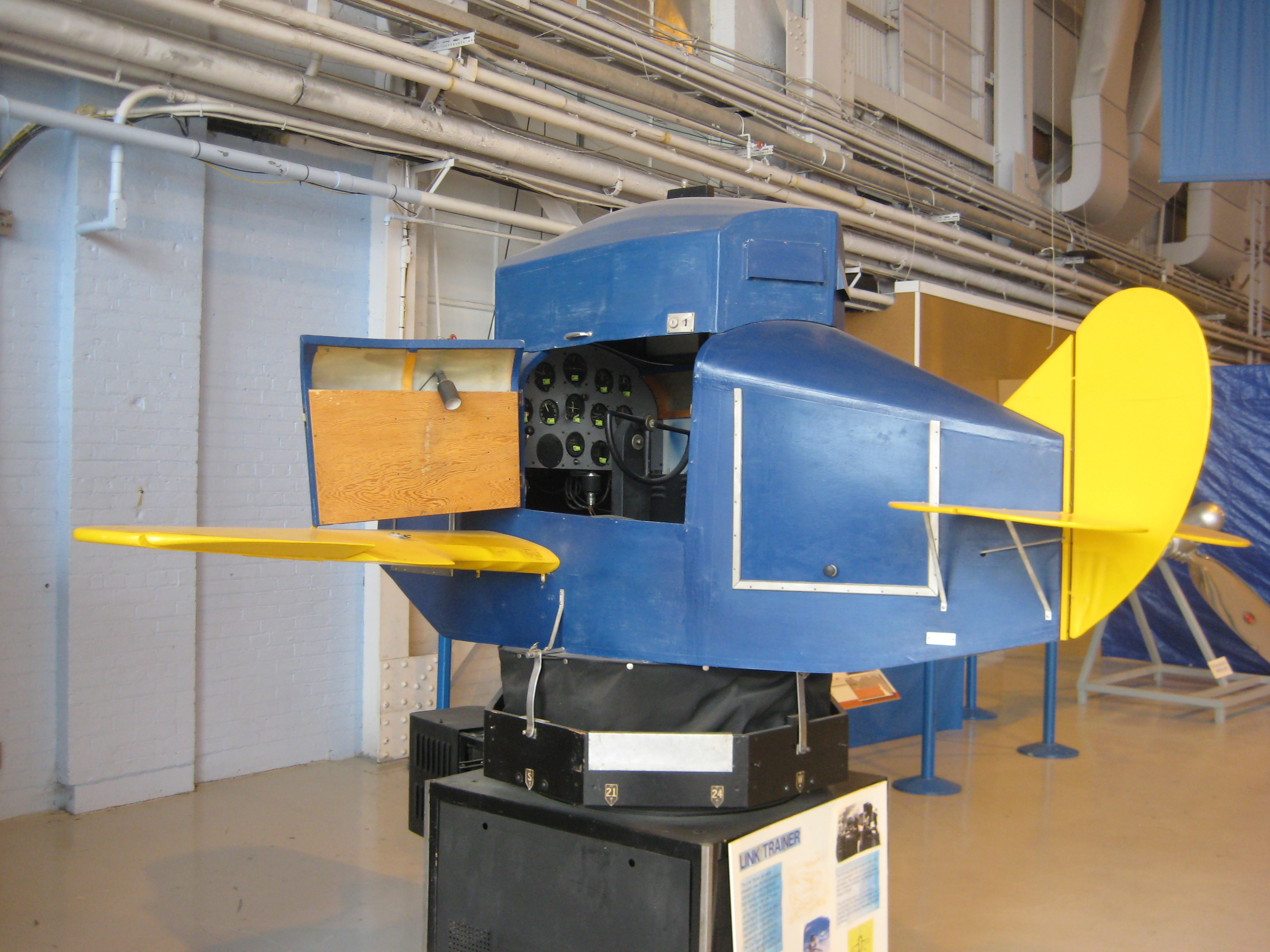
Link Trainer at the Western Canada Aviation Museum

In the 1920s, he developed the Link Trainer, "a fuselage-like device with a cockpit and controls that produced the motions and sensations of flying."

Much of the pneumatic system was adapted directly from technology used in the organ factory; and, in the 1970s, Link used parts scavenged from an inoperative trainer to help rebuild a Link pipe organ.

=== Link Aeronautical Corporation ===
He formed the Link Aeronautical Corporation in 1929 to manufacture the trainers. His few early customers were amusement parks, not flight training schools; the early models served as amusement rides. Finally, in 1934, the United States Army Air Corps bought six. During World War II, more than half a million airmen were taught using the Link Trainer. In 2000 the Link Trainer was placed on the List of Historic Mechanical Engineering Landmarks.

=== Link Aviation ===
Together with his wife Marion Clayton Link, whom he had married in 1931, Edwin Link managed the very successful Link Aviation, Inc. He contributed a great deal to the Binghamton, New York area, where he set up a production facility that at one time employed thousands of workers. Although the company later passed through different ownership, its legacy can be traced to the current CAE USA Inc. division known as Link Training and Simulation, now headquartered in Arlington, Texas (though it still maintains some operations in Binghamton).

=== The Link Foundation ===
In 1953, Edwin and Marion Link established The Link Foundation. The foundation continues to provide grants and fellowships in aeronautics, simulation and training, ocean engineering, energy, and organizations of interest to the Links.

== Undersea interests ==
=== Man-in-Sea project ===
After Link sold his company to General Precision in 1954, he turned his attention to underwater archaeology and research. Link worked at developing equipment for deeper, longer lasting and more secure diving. To this end he designed several submersible decompression chambers. On August 28, 1962, at Villefranche-sur-Mer on the Mediterranean Sea, Link inaugurated his "Man in Sea" project by spending eight hours at a depth of 60 feet (18 m) in his submersible decompression chamber (SDC), becoming the first diver to be completely saturated with a mixture of oxygen and helium (heliox) while breathing underwater. This dive served as a test run for a dive the following month by Robert Sténuit, who spent over 24 hours in the SDC at a depth of 200 feet (61 m) and thus became the world's first aquanaut. In June–July 1964, Link conducted his second Man in Sea experiment in the Berry Islands (a chain in the Bahamas) with Sténuit and Jon Lindbergh, one of the sons of Charles Lindbergh. Sténuit and Lindbergh stayed in Link's SPID habitat (Submersible, Portable, Inflatable Dwelling) for 49 hours underwater at a depth of 432 feet (132 m), breathing a helium-oxygen mixture. Dr. Joseph B. MacInnis participated in this dive as a life support specialist.

=== Submersibles ===
In March 1967, Link launched Deep Diver, the first small submersible designed for lockout diving, allowing divers to leave and enter the craft while underwater. Deep Diver carried out many scientific missions in 1967 and 1968, including a 430-foot (130 m) lockout dive in 1967 (at the same location as the 1964 Sténuit-Lindbergh dive) and a 700-foot (210 m) lockout dive near Great Stirrup Cay in 1968. Dr. MacInnis participated in both of these dives as an observer in Deep Diver's forward chamber.

Later in 1968, after Deep Diver had been requisitioned by the United States Navy to help search for the lost submarine USS Scorpion, the Bureau of Ships determined that Deep Diver was unsafe for use at great depths or in extremely cold temperatures because of the substitution of the wrong kind of steel, which became brittle in cold water, in some parts of the sub. Link proceeded to design a new lockout sub with a distinctive acrylic bubble as the forward pilot/observer compartment. In January 1971 the new sub was launched and commissioned to the Smithsonian Institution. It was named the Johnson Sea Link after its donors, Link and his friend John Seward Johnson I.

=== Death of son ===
In June 1973, Link's 31-year-old son, Edwin Clayton Link, and another diver, 51-year-old Albert D. Stover, died during a scheduled dive off Key West. They suffered carbon dioxide poisoning when the Johnson Sea Link became trapped in debris around a Navy destroyer, the Fred T. Berry, which had been sunk to create an artificial reef. The submersible's other two occupants survived. Over the next two years, Edwin Link designed an unmanned Cabled Observation and Rescue Device (CORD) that could free a trapped submersible.

== Death ==
Edwin Link died in his sleep on September 7, 1981, in Binghamton, New York, where he had been undergoing treatment for cancer.

== Honors ==
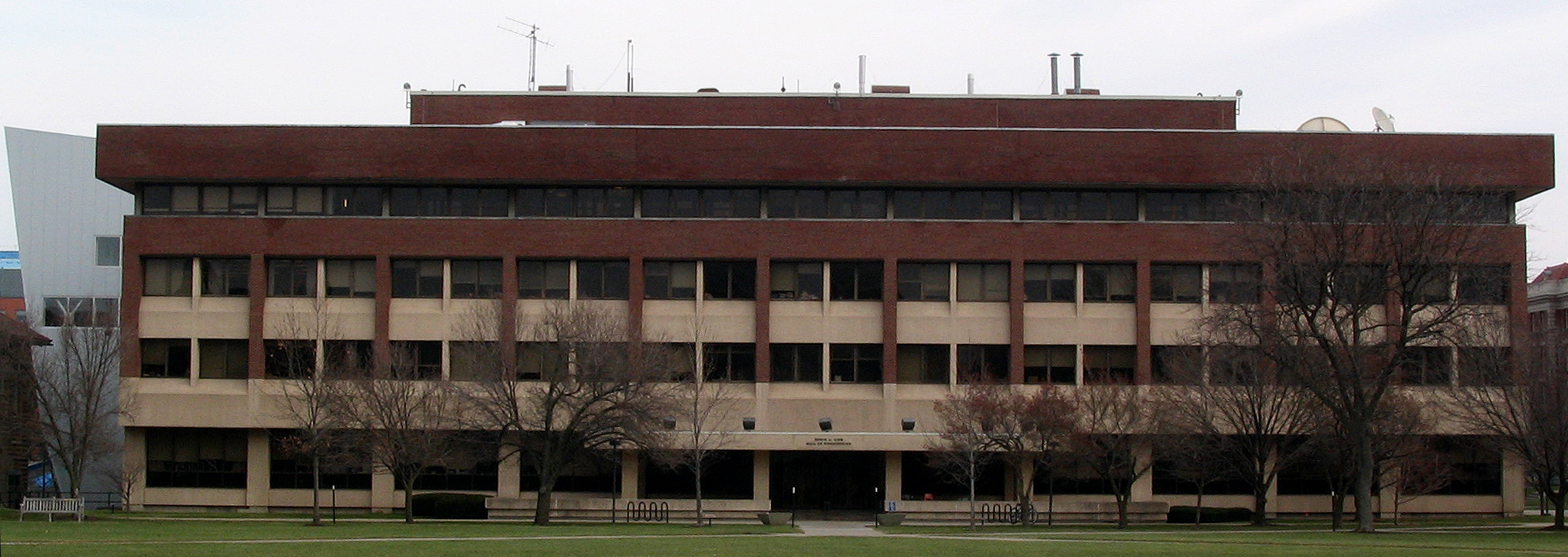
Link Hall, Syracuse University

Link was awarded the Howard N. Potts Medal in 1945 for developing training devices for aviators, and the Royal Aeronautical Society Wakefield Gold Medal in 1947. He received an honorary degree from Syracuse University in 1966 and Binghamton University in 1981. In 1976, he was inducted into the National Aviation Hall of Fame.

In 1992, Link was inducted into the International Air & Space Hall of Fame at the San Diego Air & Space Museum.

Link donated $6 million to build the engineering building on the campus of Syracuse University. The Edwin A. Link Hall of Engineering was dedicated in presence of Link and his family on October 16, 1970. It currently houses offices, classrooms and laboratories of the Syracuse University College of Engineering and Computer Science.

From the early 1980s to the 1990s, what is now Greater Binghamton Airport was named Edwin A. Link Field-Broome County Airport his honor,. The field is still named after Link, and there is an original "Blue Box" on display in the terminal.

The Link Building at Florida Institute of Technology (Melbourne, FL) is named for Edwin A. Link inventor of the Link Trainer and co-founder of the Harbor Branch Oceanographic Institution. A display of an original Link Trainer can be seen in the College of Aeronautics’ Skurla Hall, a two-minute walk from the Link Building.

== Bibliography ==
- Madhavan, Guru (2024). Wicked Problems: How to Engineer a Better World. New York: W.W. Norton & Company. ISBN 978-0-393-65146-1
- Hellwarth, Ben (2012). Sealab: America's Forgotten Quest to Live and Work on the Ocean Floor. New York: Simon & Schuster. ISBN 978-0-7432-4745-0. LCCN 2011015725.
- Link, Marion Clayton (1973). Windows in the Sea. Washington, D.C.: Smithsonian Institution Press. ISBN 0-87474-130-0.
- MacInnis, Joe (1975). Underwater Man. New York: Dodd, Mead & Company. ISBN 0-396-07142-2.
- Sténuit, Robert (1966). The Deepest Days. Trans. Morris Kemp. New York: Coward-McCann. LCCN 66-10428.
- van Hoek, Susan; Link, Marion Clayton (2003). From Sky to Sea: A Story of Edwin A. Link. Flagstaff, Arizona: Best Publishing. ISBN 0-941332-27-6.
