= Stacy Haiduk =

American actress (born 1968)

- Born: April 24, 1968 (age 58); Grand Rapids, Michigan, U.S.
- Years active: 1987–present
- Spouse: Bradford Tatum (m. 1997)
- Children: 1

Stacy Haiduk (born April 24, 1968) is an American actress. She starred as Lana Lang in the syndicated superhero series Superboy (1988–1992) and as Katherine Hitchcock in the NBC science fiction series, seaQuest DSV (1993–1994). Haiduk also had leading roles in the NBC prime time soap opera, The Round Table (1992) and Fox supernatural horror series, Kindred: The Embraced (1996), and has appeared in a number of feature and made-for-television movies.

Haiduk played Hannah Nichols in the ABC daytime soap opera All My Children (2007–2008), and Patty Williams and Emily Peterson on CBS soap opera The Young and the Restless (2009–2012, 2015–2016, 2026), for which she received a Daytime Emmy Award nomination for Outstanding Supporting Actress in a Drama Series in 2017. In 2018, she began appearing as Kristen DiMera and Susan Banks on the NBC soap opera, Days of Our Lives receiving another Daytime Emmy Award nomination in 2022.

== Career ==
Haiduk was born in Grand Rapids, Michigan. She achieved national fame when she was cast in the role of Lana Lang in the live-action superhero series, Superboy in 1988. After the series ended in 1992, Haiduk portrayed the leading role of Rhea McPherson, an aspiring FBI agent, in the Aaron Spelling-produced prime time soap opera, The Round Table. Haiduk's next significant role was in the NBC science fiction series, seaQuest DSV, in which she played Lt. Cmdr. Katherine Hitchcock, the chief engineer, and third in command of the high-tech submarine. She left the series after one season in 1994. She also had a female leading role in the NBC series Route 66, a remake of the 1960s series with the same name.

Haiduk made her film debut in the 1990 horror film Luther the Geek for Troma Entertainment, and later starred in Steel and Lace (1991). She starred in the made-for-television films, notable Danielle Steel's A Perfect Stranger (based on the novel of the same name by Danielle Steel) in 1994. In 1996, Haiduk went on to play a female vampire in the Fox supernatural horror series, Kindred: The Embraced. The following year, she appeared in the romantic comedy film Little City and was lead actress in the thriller film The Beneficiary. She later guest-starred on Nash Bridges, Charmed, The X-Files, ER, NCIS, CSI: Miami, Crossing Jordan and CSI: Crime Scene Investigation. She had a recurring role as FBI Agent Elisa Thayer in Heroes from 2006 to 2007, and as Lisa Tabak in Prison Break from 2008 to 2009.

In 2006, Haiduk appeared in new supplemental material for the Superboy: The Complete First Season DVD release. She also appeared regularly on the ABC soap opera All My Children as Hannah Nichols from January 2007 through January 2008. From February 2009 to August 2010, she appeared on the CBS soap opera The Young and the Restless as Patty Williams, and also played Emily Peterson on the series. In July 2010, Haiduk was cast to play a prison warden on Days of Our Lives; she was subsequently dismissed and recast with former Santa Barbara actress Gina Gallego after three episodes, due to a scheduling conflict with The Chicago Code. Haiduk's appearances as Warden Smith aired in September 2010. She returned to prime time with the recurring roles on HBO series, True Blood from 2013 to 2014, and ABC Family series Twisted in 2014. In 2019, she starred in the Netflix thriller film, Home Is Where the Killer Is.

In 2018 it was announced that Haiduk had again been cast on Days of Our Lives, this time in the roles of Kristen DiMera and lookalike Susan Banks. In early 2019, she returned to the show, as a contracted actor.

== Personal life ==
In June 2010, an issue of Soap Opera Digest reported that Haiduk has been married to Bradford Tatum since November 11, 1997. The couple met on the set of seaQuest DSV. They have one daughter, actress Sophia Tatum. In 2009, Haiduk was the subject of an online boycott petition for apparently wearing a stuffed cat as a purse during the Daytime Emmy Awards. The cat was actually a prop used in her role on The Young and the Restless and not a purse.

== Filmography ==
=== Film ===
Year	Title	Role	Notes
1987	Magic Sticks	Laundromat Lady	
1989	Luther the Geek	Beth	
1991	Steel and Lace	Alison	
1997	The Beneficiary	Lena Girard	
1997	Little City	Julia	
1999	Desert Thunder	Ally 'Al' Malone	
2000	Nurse Betty	Soap Opera Nurse	scenes deleted
2001	Gabriela	Ilona	
2006	Salt	West	Also producer
2007	The Mannsfield 12	Lela	
2009	Within	Bernice Lowe	
2010	No Answer	Missy	
2010	Victim	Janet	
2013	Fire City: King of Miniseries	The Interpreter of Signs	Short film
2019	Home Is Where the Killer Is	Julie Thomason	
2023	No More Goodbyes	Judge	Post-production

=== Television films ===
Year	Title	Role	Network
1992	Sketch Artist	Claire	Showtime
1994	A Perfect Stranger	Raphaella Phillips	NBC
1996	Yesterday's Target	Jessica Harper	Showtime
1999	The Darwin Conspiracy	Dr. Jennifer Carter	UPN
2005	Jane Doe: Til Death Do Us Part	Monica Angelini	Hallmark
2005	Attack of the Sabretooth	Savannah	The Sci-Fi Channel
2007	While the Children Sleep	Shawna Pierson	Lifetime
2007	Final Approach	Alexa Windom	Hallmark
2013	The Nightmare Nanny	Elise	Lifetime
2018	A Father's Nightmare	Zofia Redlynn	Lifetime

=== Television series ===
Year	Title	Role	Notes
1988–1992	Superboy	Lana Lang	Series regular, 100 episodes
1991	Parker Lewis Can't Lose	Claire	Episode: "Stormy Mikey"
1992	The Round Table	Rhea McPherson	Series regular, 7 episodes
1993	Route 66	Lilly	Series regular, 4 episodes
1993–1994	SeaQuest DSV	Katherine Hitchcock	Series regular, 23 episodes
1994	Due South	Janice DeLuca	Episodes: "Chicago Holiday: Part 1" and "Chicago Holiday: Part 2"
1996	Kindred: The Embraced	Lillie Langtry	Series regular, 8 episodes
1997	C-16: FBI	Sandy Maddox	Episode: "The Sandman"
1997	Melrose Place	Colleen Patterson	6 episodes
1998	Nash Bridges	Pamela Smith	Episode: "Danger Zone"
1998	Profiler	Andrea	Episode: "Do the Right Thing"
1998–1999	Brimstone	Rosalyn Stone	3 episodes
1999	Charmed	Guardian of the Urn	Episode: "Feats of Clay"
1999	The Sentinel	Veronica	Episode: "Dead End on Blank Street"
2000	The X-Files	Margaret Waterston	Episode: "all things"
2001	The Division	Mrs. Evans	Episode: "Forces of Deviance"
2001	ER	Impaled Mom	Episode: "The Crossing"
2003	CSI: Miami	Dawn Kaye	Episode: "Body Count"
2004	NCIS	Melissa Dorn	Episode: "My Other Left Foot"
2005	Wildfire	Barb Furillo	Episode: "Mothers"
2006	Crossing Jordan	Mrs. Cartland	Episode: "The Elephant in the Room"
2006	Cold Case	Anne Bowen	Episode: "The River"
2006	CSI: NY	Debra Archerson	Episode: "Sweet 16"
2006–2007	Heroes	FBI Agent Elisa Thayer	4 episodes
2007–2008	All My Children	Hannah Nichols	56 episodes, March 27 – May 2007; September 2007 – January 14, 2008
2008	Life	Dr. Lana James	Episode: "Everything... All the Time"
2008–2009	Prison Break	Lisa Tabak	9 episodes
2009	Burn Notice	Rachel	Episode: "Do No Harm"
2009–2012; 2015–2016; 2026–present	The Young and the Restless	Patty Williams	February 10, 2009 – August 6, 2010; November 7, 2011 – March 5, 2012, September 20–28, 2012; September 21, 2015 – October 31, 2016; March 6, 2026 – present
2009–2012; 2015–2016; 2026–present	The Young and the Restless	Dr. Emily Peterson	October 13, 2009 – August 6, 2010; November 29, 2011 – February 7, 2012
2010	Days of Our Lives	Warden Smith	3 episodes
2011	Southland	Sally	Episodes: "Let It Snow" and "Punching Water"
2011	The Chicago Code	Madam	Episode: "The Gold Coin Kid"
2011	Crime Scene Investigation	Gina Sinclair	Episode: "Bittersweet"
2011	The Mentalist	Cynthia Satterfield	Episode: "Fugue in Red"
2012	Hawaii Five-0	Nancy O'Hara	Episode: "Ha'alele (Abandoned)"
2012	Longmire	Julia Sublette	Episode: "8 Seconds"
2013–2014	True Blood	Jenny	4 episodes
2014	Twisted	Marilyn Rossi	4 episodes
2014	Chosen	Shondra	3 episodes
2018	Sharp Objects	Crystal Capisi	Episode: "Dirt"
2018–present	Days of Our Lives	Kristen DiMera; Susan Banks	Series regular

=== Video games ===
Year	Game	Role
2011	Star Wars: The Old Republic	Akaavi Spar (voice)
2013	Star Wars: The Old Republic – Rise of the Hutt Cartel	Akaavi Spar (voice)
2014	Star Wars: The Old Republic – Shadow of Revan	Akaavi Spar (voice)
2016	Mirror's Edge Catalyst	Aline Maera (Voice)

== Awards and nominations ==
Year	Award	Category	Work	Result	Ref.
2016	Soap Awards France	Best Villain of the Year	The Young and the Restless	Nominated	
2017	Daytime Emmy Award	Outstanding Supporting Actress in a Drama Series	The Young and the Restless	Nominated	
2022	Daytime Emmy Award	Outstanding Supporting Actress in a Drama Series	Days of Our Lives	Nominated	
2023	Daytime Emmy Award	Outstanding Supporting Actress in a Drama Series	Days of Our Lives	Nominated	
2026	Daytime Emmy Award	Outstanding Lead Actress in a Drama Series	Days of Our Lives	Nominated	
