= Vacancy (film) =

2007 American horror film by Nimród Antal

- Theatrical release poster
- Directed by: Nimród Antal
- Written by: Mark L. Smith
- Produced by: Hal Lieberman
- Starring: Kate Beckinsale; Luke Wilson; Frank Whaley; Ethan Embry
- Cinematography: Andrzej Sekuła
- Edited by: Armen Minasian
- Music by: Paul Haslinger
- Production companies: Screen Gems; Hal Lieberman Company
- Distributed by: Sony Pictures Releasing
- Release date: April 20, 2007
- Running time: 85 minutes
- Country: United States
- Language: English
- Budget: $19 million
- Box office: $35.4 million

Vacancy is a 2007 American horror film directed by Nimród Antal and written by Mark L. Smith. It stars Kate Beckinsale and Luke Wilson as a married couple who book at the motel after their car breaks down and are soon stalked by masked killers for their snuff films. It was released April 20, 2007, by the distributor Screen Gems.

== Plot ==
On their way home from a family party, David and Amy Fox, who are on the verge of divorce after the death of their son, are on a remote mountain road due to a wreck slowing down the interstate. They stop at an old auto repair garage after their car starts making a noise. A mechanic apparently fixes the car but says he is about to close. Soon after leaving, their car breaks down. When they find that there is no cell phone reception, they walk back to the garage, only to find it has already closed. They walk to a nearby motel to seek help. When they arrive at the reception office, they hear a piercing scream coming from the room at the back of the reception, only for it to be coming from the television. The motel manager, Mason, turns it off and meets the couple. He explains the auto repair garage across the street is closed until the morning, so they book a room for the night.

While getting ready for bed, David and Amy are alarmed by loud banging on their door and the door to the adjacent room. David goes to reception to tell Mason about the situation, and Mason tells them they are his only guests. Back in the room, David watches a videotape that has been left in the room's VCR. At first it seems to be a horror film, but then they realize it is a fetishistic snuff film that was made in their room. David searches the room and finds multiple hidden security cameras and realizes that Mason is watching them. The recording shows previous guests being assaulted by two men then murdered by them.

David and Amy flee the room for the woods, but are confronted by two men wearing masks, so they return to the room and lock the door. In the bathroom, they are shocked to find the half-eaten apple Amy left in the car. David runs to the motel's payphone and dials 911, but Mason answers. David escapes the phone booth just before the men crash their car into it and chase him back to the room. Moments later, David and Amy hear a truck pull into the parking lot. From the window, they attract the driver's attention, but soon realize he is working with Mason. They then discover a trapdoor in the bathroom, leading to various tunnels to different rooms of the motel. They end up in the manager's room. Amy attempts to call the police but is interrupted by Mason.

Followed by the masked men, they sneak back into the tunnel and take a different route, ending up in the auto garage across from the motel. Meanwhile, a sheriff appears, having responded to Amy's attempted call. Upon searching one of the rooms, he witnesses a snuff film and flees. David and Amy run to him, and they all attempt to leave but find the engine wire to the police car has been cut. When the officer gets out, the masked men kill him. David and Amy run into one of the other rooms. David hides Amy in the ceiling while he plans to make it to Mason's office to retrieve a revolver, but the men stab him as he leaves. He collapses as Amy watches from above.

In the morning, Amy comes down and leaves, finding one of the killers' car. As she attempts to drive away, a masked man breaks into the car from the sun roof, and she crashes the car into the motel, killing him and the other man (the latter of which is revealed to be the mechanic who "helped" the couple earlier). Amy then runs into the reception, where she finds the revolver. Mason appears and begins to strangle her with the telephone cord, then beats her as he records the struggle with his video camera while laughing maniacally. Amy fights back and manages to gain the upper hand, finally shooting Mason dead.

Amy returns to David and finds he is still alive. She goes back to reception, takes the phone cord from Mason's jacket pocket, and connects it to the phone to call 911. She then goes back to David, comforting him while waiting for the police to arrive.

== Cast ==
- Kate Beckinsale as Amy Fox
- Luke Wilson as David Fox
- Frank Whaley as Mason
- Ethan Embry as The Mechanic
- Scott G. Anderson as The Killer
- David Doty as Highway Patrol

== Production ==
In March 2005, it was announced Hal Lieberman would be producing Vacancy written by Mark L. Smith for Screen Gems.

Early in the film's development, it was thought Sarah Jessica Parker would star; but, in September 2006, The Hollywood Reporter announced Beckinsale had been signed instead.

== Release ==
Vacancy opened at #4 in its first week at the box office grossing $7.6 million at 2,551 locations. In its second week, the film had a 45.9% drop-off, falling to a #8 position. The film has grossed a total of $35.3 million worldwide.

=== Home video ===
Vacancy was released on DVD on August 14, 2007, in both fullscreen and anamorphic widescreen, with Dolby Digital 5.1 audio. Special features include deleted scenes, a making-of featurette, the full versions of the snuff films, and a trailer gallery. It was also released on Blu-ray Disc and UMD for the PSP. Many versions shipped to Australia featured Sony DVD "anti-piracy" technology, which led to them being unreadable on most DVD players, including Sony DVD players. The DVD featured a commentary by Nimrod Antal, Kate Beckinsale and Luke Wilson, all of whom said they thought the film was a great addition to the horror genre and for not using gore for scares but using psychological horror.

=== Advertising and promotion ===
The advertising strategy for the film made use of the Internet as well as a toll-free phone number. In addition to the TV spots and trailers shown in theaters and on television, the toll free number was made to sound as if one is actually calling the motel in which the film is set. In the background, screaming can be heard accompanying the voice of the proprietor, who informs callers about "slashing" prices and the "killer" deals that the motel has—if it has a vacancy. The voice of the proprietor is Frank Whaley's. As of August 7, 2015, the toll-free phone number is no longer valid.

== Reception ==
Review aggregator website Rotten Tomatoes reports that 55% of 123 surveyed critics gave the film a positive review, with an average rating of 5.4/10. The site's consensus reads: "Vacancy's restraint with gore is commendable, the thin characters and B-movie cliches less so." Metacritic assigned the film a weighted average score of 54 out of 100 based on 27 critics, indicating "mixed or average reviews". Audiences polled by CinemaScore gave the film an average grade of "B−" on an A+ to F scale.

Ty Burr of The Boston Globe described the film as "a stripped-down suspense drama" and "the kind of taut B-movie chiller they don't make any more", with a set-up "as simple and stark as an urban legend." However, he was careful to mention, "I don't want to oversell the thing. There's no agenda in Vacancy other than to keep you in a state of nervous collapse for 85 minutes", and he criticized the film's ending, which he called "a disappointment", writing, "I don't know when I've seen a thriller this unpretentiously well-crafted sputter to so inconsequential an end."

Writing for The Guardian, feature writer Rob Mackie favorably compared the film's opening to "classic-period Hitchcock, and Psycho in particular", writing, "What makes Nimrod Antal's film genuinely scary and gripping is that the script and acting are far better than [...] your routine slasher/shocker knock-off." He further noted that "[t]here are plenty of shocks and surprises" and described the film as "psychological horror rather than gorefest," although he expressed ambiguity over the film's abrupt ending: "One of the biggest shocks in Vacancy is that, after 84 minutes, it ends. Just like that."

In a 2007 episode of Ebert and Roeper, film critic Richard Roeper gave the film a negative review, calling it an "uninspired, unoriginal, and chills-free thriller", and was disappointed with the central characters, saying "apparently these two have never seen any scary movies because they make rookie mistakes" and "do one stupid thing after another so the movie can keep going." He concluded that "with two appealing leads and a nifty opening credits sequence, Vacancy seems like it has potential" but that it was ultimately "a slick and lazy effort."

Empire magazine awarded the film three out of five stars, praising its director as "genuinely good at this stuff, honing mercilessly in on faces in extreme close-up and investing ordinary items [...] with disproportionate levels of menace", and calling the film "a lean and slightly unusual genre pic" that has "Psycho's crimson fingerprints all over it", but concluded that while the film "starts off strongly", ultimately "the build-up is better than the main event."

== Prequel ==
Vacancy 2: The First Cut was released in 2008. Written by Mark L. Smith, and directed by Eric Bross, it serves as a prequel, and focuses on how the motel's employees started their tortures. The film stars Agnes Bruckner and Trevor Wright.

The horror films Terror Trap and The Helpers are sometimes called Vacancy 3 and Vacancy 4, respectively, although they are unconnected.

== See also ==
- List of films featuring surveillance
