= MXP: Most Xtreme Primate =

2003 Canadian film by Robert Vince

- DVD cover
- Directed by: Robert Vince
- Screenplay by: Anna Singer; Anne Vince; Anna McRoberts
- Story by: Anne Vince; Robert Vince
- Starring: Robby Benson; Devin Douglas Drewitz; Trevor Wright; Ian Bagg; Rob Tinkler; Gwynyth Walsh; Nicole McKay; James Crescenzo; Bjorn Leines
- Cinematography: Mike Southon
- Edited by: Kelly Herron
- Music by: Brahm Wenger
- Production company: Keystone Family Pictures (Note: As Monkey See Productions Inc.)
- Distributed by: Buena Vista Home Entertainment
- Release dates: December 2003 (WFF); January 20, 2004 (United States)
- Running time: 88 minutes
- Country: Canada
- Language: English

MXP: Most Xtreme Primate is a 2003 Canadian sports comedy film directed and co-produced by Robert Vince, and a sequel to MVP: Most Valuable Primate (2000) and MVP 2: Most Vertical Primate (2001). MXP: Most Xtreme Primate follows Jack, an athletic chimpanzee who meets sibling snowboarders Pete (played by Devin Douglas Drewitz) and Jay (Trevor Wright); together they outwit a pair of criminals while attempting to win a snowboard cross championship.

MXP: Most Xtreme Primate had its world premiere at the Whistler Film Festival in Whistler, British Columbia, in December 2003. Unlike its predecessors, the film did not see a theatrical release, instead being released direct-to-video through Buena Vista Home Entertainment on January 20, 2004.

== Plot ==
Jack, a chimpanzee known for his athletic talent, is accidentally sent to a ski resort during a trip. There, he meets Ben and Cara, two siblings who are learning to snowboard. Jack quickly adapts to the sport and impresses everyone with his skills on the slopes. However, a group of antagonists discovers his talent and plans to capture him to commercially exploit his unique abilities. With the help of Ben and Cara, Jack must escape these dangers while competing in extreme snowboarding competitions, facing challenges, and strengthening their friendship along the way.

== Cast ==
- Robby Benson as Edward
- Devin Douglas Drewitz as Pete
- Trevor Wright as Jay
- Ian Bagg as Gilfred
- Rob Tinkler as Stanley
- Gwynyth Walsh as Julie
- Nicole McKay as Howeena
- James Crescenzo as Paulie
- Bjorn Leines as Himself
- Louie as Louie the Chimpanzee
- Jack as Jack the Chimpanzee

== Production ==
In MXP: Most Xtreme Primate, Jack is portrayed by Louie, a chimpanzee owned by Greg and Carol Lille. Louie was trained to snowboard by skiing and snowboarding instructor Sam Morishima, first using an indoor ski deck, then on hills and slopes on the Lilles' property, and finally on slopes at Soda Springs Ski Resort near Lake Tahoe in California. Louie had a "warming tent" set up for him, with a heater, to serve as a respite from the cold temperatures.
