= Samaritan (film) =

2022 film by Julius Avery

- Promotional release poster
- Directed by: Julius Avery
- Written by: Bragi F. Schut
- Produced by: Sylvester Stallone; Braden Aftergood
- Starring: Sylvester Stallone; Javon "Wanna" Walton; Pilou Asbæk; Dascha Polanco; Moisés Arias
- Cinematography: David Ungaro
- Edited by: Matt Evans; Pete Beaudreau
- Music by: Jed Kurzel; Kevin Kiner
- Production companies: Metro-Goldwyn-Mayer Pictures; Balboa Productions
- Distributed by: United Artists Releasing; Amazon Studios
- Release date: August 26, 2022
- Running time: 101 minutes
- Country: United States
- Language: English
- Budget: $100 million

Samaritan is a 2022 American superhero film directed by Julius Avery and written by Bragi F. Schut. Described as a gritty and dark take on superhero movies, the story was previously adapted into a series of graphic novels. It is a co-production of Metro-Goldwyn-Mayer Pictures and Balboa Productions. The film stars Sylvester Stallone in the main role, Javon "Wanna" Walton, Pilou Asbæk, Dascha Polanco, and Moisés Arias. The story follows Sam Cleary, a kid who suspects that his neighbor Joe Smith is secretly the superhero Samaritan who was believed to have died many years prior. Samaritan was released on August 26, 2022, by United Artists Releasing and Amazon Studios via streaming on Prime Video. The film received mixed reviews from critics.

== Plot ==
Superhumans Samaritan and Nemesis were antagonistic twin brothers who lived in Granite City, where the residents at the time burned down their home, only for the twins to escape, while their parents died in the fire. Samaritan grew up to become a superhero, whereas Nemesis became a supervillain. Evenly matched, the villainous Nemesis crafted a sledgehammer that gave him an edge over the heroic Samaritan. During a confrontation at the city's power plant, both were apparently killed as the plant exploded, blacking out the city.

Twenty five years later, thirteen-year-old Sam Cleary tries his best to help his mother Tiffany with their financial crisis, and, after being threatened with eviction, he accepts a job from a gang headed by Reza. The plan goes awry, and Reza tries to blame Sam, but the real gang leader, Cyrus, is impressed. Reza and his friends later attack Sam as payback but are stopped by Joe Smith, a garbage collector. Joe displays super-strength in fighting off the gang members, and Sam suspects that he is Samaritan. Meanwhile, Cyrus locates Nemesis' hammer at a police station and sets himself up as the new Nemesis, sparking chaos throughout the city.

After Sam confronts him, Joe denies that he is Samaritan, but Reza - still looking for revenge - hits him with his car. Joe is badly injured but heals before Sam's eyes. Joe and Sam build a friendship and Joe reveals that he needs ice to cool his body. Later, Cyrus invites Sam to work with his gang. However, Sam is disturbed when he witnesses their violent activities.

When Joe saves a young girl from an explosion caused by the gang, the media claims that Samaritan is back, threatening Cyrus' plans. Reza recognizes Joe as being the same person he "killed" with his car and thus, confirms his identity and connection to Sam. Finding Joe's apartment empty, they kidnap Sam and Tiffany to lure out Joe. Joe breaks into their hideout and decimates the gang before being confronted by Cyrus, now dressed as Nemesis and wielding the hammer. As they fight, with Cyrus calling himself Nemesis, and Joe "the good guy", Joe reveals that Samaritan did die during the power plant fire, and he is actually Nemesis, who survived but left his villainous life behind. Destroying the hammer, Joe kills Cyrus.

Joe tells Sam that there is good and evil in all people and that Sam has to make the right decisions. As the police arrest Reza and the remaining members of Cyrus' gang, Joe leaves, overhearing Sam tell the press that "Samaritan" survived and saved him.

== Cast ==
- Sylvester Stallone as Joe Smith / Samaritan / Nemesis
- Javon "Wanna" Walton as Sam Cleary
- Pilou Asbæk as Cyrus / Nemesis II
- Dascha Polanco as Tiffany Cleary
- Moisés Arias as Reza
- Martin Starr as Albert Casler
- Sophia Tatum as Sil
- Jared Odrick as Farshad
- Henry G. Sanders as Arthur Holloway
- Shameik Moore as Devin Holloway
- Michael Aaron Milligan as Tuna
- Abraham Clinkscales as Jace

== Production ==
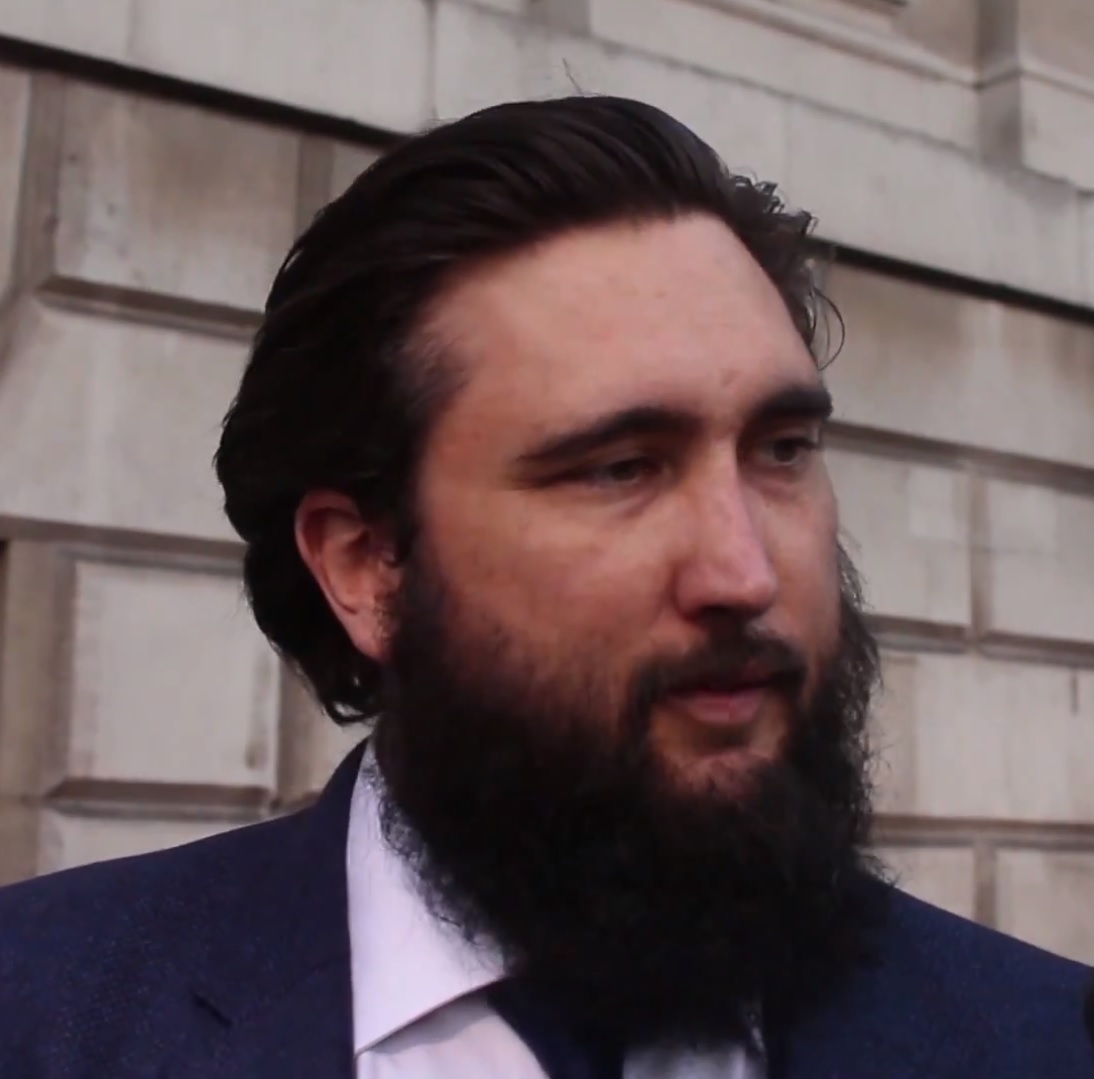
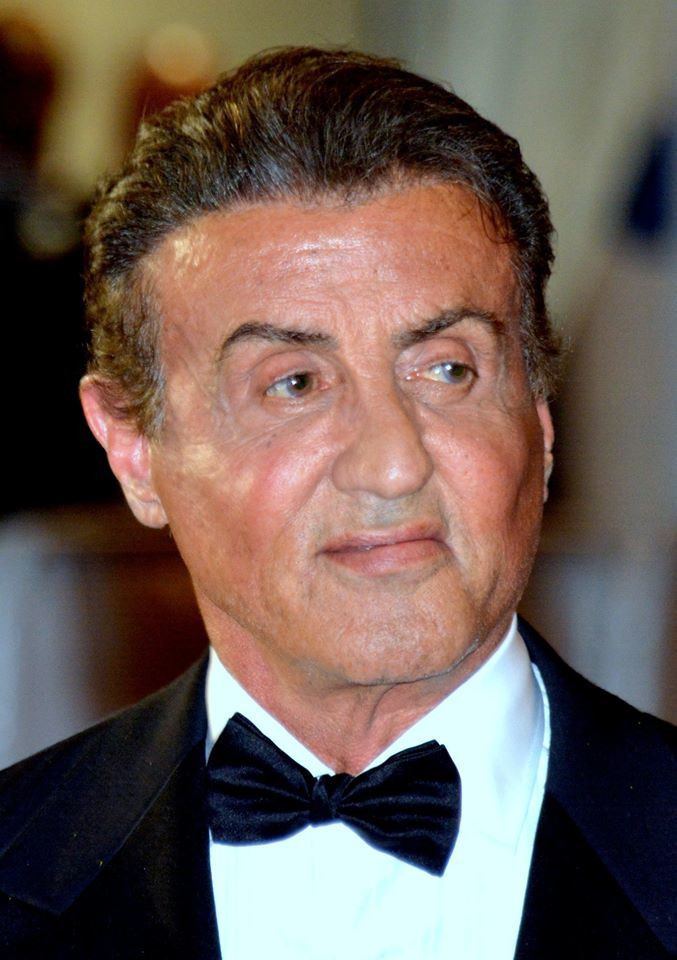
Director Julius Avery and lead actor/co-producer Sylvester Stallone.

=== Writing ===
In February 2019, it was announced that Metro-Goldwyn-Mayer had acquired a spec script by Bragi F. Schut titled Samaritan to be co-produced with Balboa Productions. Schut had written the screenplay prior to adapting the story in a series of graphic novels published by Mythos Comics. In September 2019, Julius Avery joined the production as director.

=== Casting ===
In February 2019, it was announced that Sylvester Stallone would star in the titular role and also act as producer. In February 2020, Martin Starr, Moisés Arias, Dascha Polanco, Pilou Asbæk, Javon 'Wanna' Walton, Jared Odrick and Michael Aaron Milligan joined the cast in supporting roles. In March 2020, Natacha Karam joined the cast of the film but did not appear in the finished film.

=== Filming ===
In September 2019, filming was scheduled for a 2020 start date in Atlanta. Filming was confirmed to have commenced by February 26, 2020. On March 14, the production went on hiatus due to the COVID-19 pandemic. By October 8, 2020, filming had resumed.

== Music ==
Jed Kurzel and Kevin Kiner composed the film score, with former previously collaborating with Avery on Overlord (2018). Lakeshore Records released the soundtrack.

== Release ==
=== Streaming ===
The release of Samaritan was delayed several times, having been previously scheduled to be released theatrically on November 20, 2020, December 11, 2020, and June 4, 2021. The film was released on August 26, 2022, in the United States by United Artists Releasing and Amazon Studios, the latter having purchased MGM that same year, via streaming on Prime Video.

== Home media ==
It was released on DVD, Blu-ray and 4K Ultra HD Blu-ray on January 3, 2023 by MGM Home Entertainment, (through Universal Pictures Home Entertainment).

== Reception ==
On the review aggregator website Rotten Tomatoes, 38% of 115 critics' reviews are positive, with an average rating of 5/10. The website's consensus reads: "Although Samaritan is better than it could have been, this Stallone-led superhero drama is creatively underpowered." Metacritic, which uses a weighted average, assigned the film a score of 45 out of 100, based on 28 critics, indicating "mixed or average" reviews.
