= Twisters (film) =

2024 film by Lee Isaac Chung

- Theatrical release poster
- Directed by: Lee Isaac Chung
- Screenplay by: Mark L. Smith
- Story by: Joseph Kosinski
- Based on: Characters by: Michael Crichton; Anne-Marie Martin
- Produced by: Frank Marshall; Patrick Crowley
- Starring: Daisy Edgar-Jones; Glen Powell; Anthony Ramos; Brandon Perea; Maura Tierney; Sasha Lane
- Cinematography: Dan Mindel
- Edited by: Terilyn A. Shropshire
- Music by: Benjamin Wallfisch
- Production companies: Universal Pictures; Warner Bros. Pictures; Amblin Entertainment; The Kennedy/Marshall Company
- Distributed by: Universal Pictures (United States and Canada); Warner Bros. Pictures (International)
- Release dates: July 8, 2024 (Cineworld Leicester Square); July 19, 2024 (United States)
- Running time: 122 minutes
- Country: United States
- Language: English
- Budget: $155 million
- Box office: $372.3 million

Twisters is a 2024 American disaster film directed by Lee Isaac Chung and written by Mark L. Smith, based on a story by Joseph Kosinski. A standalone sequel to Twister (1996), the ensemble cast includes Daisy Edgar-Jones, Glen Powell, Anthony Ramos, Brandon Perea, Maura Tierney, and Sasha Lane. It follows clashing groups of storm chasers who investigate a tornado outbreak in Oklahoma.

Talks for a sequel to Twister began in 2020, with Kosinski pitching an idea to Warner Bros. Helen Hunt, who starred in the original, had also expressed interest in developing a follow-up that was ultimately rejected. Several other directors were approached before Chung was hired in December 2022. The cast joined in early-2023 and filming took place around Oklahoma that summer, with a brief hiatus due to the SAG-AFTRA strike.

Twisters premiered at the Empire Leicester Square in London on July 8, 2024, and was released internationally by Warner Bros. Pictures on July 10, and in the United States and Canada by Universal Pictures on July 19. It received generally positive reviews from critics and grossed over $372 million worldwide on a $155 million budget.

== Plot ==
Kate Carter works in Oklahoma with storm chasers Javi, Addy, Praveen, and her boyfriend, Jeb. Alongside a Dorothy V doppler, the team launches barrels of sodium polyacrylate beads into a tornado in hopes of reducing its intensity and securing funding for further research. However, the crew is caught in the middle as it intensifies into an EF5. Addy, Praveen, and Jeb are killed, while Kate and Javi survive.

Five years later, Kate works at a NOAA office in New York City. Javi, working for mobile tornado radar company Storm Par, offers Kate a one-week position with his team to test a new 3D tornado scanning system using phased-array radar. Kate only accepts after Javi sends a news report about a tornado destroying a town. Kate and Javi join the Storm Par team in Oklahoma, which includes Javi's business partner Scott. Popular YouTube storm chaser Tyler Owens, known as the "Tornado Wrangler", also arrives in Oklahoma from Arkansas looking to capitalize on a predicted tornado outbreak. Tyler is joined by his crew of Boone, Dani, Dexter, and Lily, as well as British journalist Ben.

Storm Par and Tyler's crew chase an EF1 tornado that has touched down in a nearby wind farm. Kate experiences a panic attack, rendering her unable to help Javi set up the third and final scanner needed for 3D imaging and she instead drives away. The team tracks another storm which produces another EF1, that also produces a Satellite that splits off. Storm Par chases the Satellite after noticing that it is intensifying, but as it reaches EF3 strength, it takes out the third scanner. Kate and Javi barely escape and drive to the nearby tornado-ravaged town of Crystal Springs to help recovery efforts, along with Tyler's crew. Having dismissed Tyler and his team as glory hounds, Kate is surprised to learn they use merchandise profits to aid tornado victims, while Storm Par investor Marshall Riggs profiteers by purchasing tornado-damaged land.

Tyler invites Kate to a nearby rodeo in Stillwater, where they begin bonding. When a large tornado hits, Kate leads Tyler and nearby residents to shelter in an empty motel pool. In the aftermath, Kate and Javi argue about Riggs' intentions, causing Javi to blame Kate for their colleagues' deaths. Distraught, Kate retreats to her mother's farm in Sapulpa. Tyler follows and uncovers Kate's previous research regarding the tornado disruption experiment. Kate initially declines Tyler's offer to help retry the experiment but finally accepts. The next day, they release the beads into a passing tornado, but it fails to dissipate. Using scanning data provided by an apologetic Javi, Kate hypothesizes a change in the experiment to correct a previous oversight, namely adding silver iodide.

The team tracks another tornado developing near El Reno. Javi and Scott's truck is knocked on its side and back upright again; they escape just as the tornado catches fire after striking an oil refinery. The tornado explodes in size becoming a mile-wide EF5 that heads towards El Reno. Javi attempts to rush to El Reno to help recovery efforts, but Scott pressures him to continue their mission for Riggs. Javi abandons Scott by the road and quits Storm Par.

Kate, Tyler, and their team evacuate the townsfolk into a nearby movie theater. A derailed streetcar and debris traps Tyler. Kate struggles to free him, but with the arrival of Javi, Tyler is rescued. Kate drives Tyler's truck into the tornado's center. She fires the silver iodide into the tornado, and after a brief struggle with the controls, she launches the polyacrylite beads also, but the vehicle is overturned before landing on its roof. The tornado rips the theater open, nearly pulling Lily and Tyler out just as the measures take effect, weakening the tornado. The team rescues Kate and celebrates the dissipating tornado.

Sometime later, as Kate waits at the airport for her plane to New York, Tyler catches up with her to reconcile with her. Upon learning that flights have been delayed because of strong winds, the two swiftly depart for the storm. A closing montage shows that Kate, Javi, and Tyler have joined in a new tornado radar business and that Ben's story focused on Kate instead of Tyler.

== Cast ==
- Daisy Edgar-Jones as Kate Carter, a meteorologist and former storm chaser
- Glen Powell as Tyler Owens, an internet famous storm chaser and meteorologist
- Anthony Ramos as Javi, Kate's friend and former storm chaser colleague
- Brandon Perea as Boone, a videographer and member of Tyler's crew
- Maura Tierney as Cathy, Kate's mother
- Harry Hadden-Paton as Ben, a London journalist profiling Tyler
- Sasha Lane as Lily, a drone operator and member of Tyler's crew
- Daryl McCormack as Jeb, Kate's boyfriend and member of her former storm chasing team
- Kiernan Shipka as Addy, a member of Kate's former storm chasing team
- Nik Dodani as Praveen, a member of Kate's former storm chasing team
- David Corenswet as Scott, Javi's business partner
- Tunde Adebimpe as Dexter, a scientist and a member of Tyler's crew
- Katy O'Brian as Dani, a mechanic and member of Tyler's crew
- David Born as Riggs, a Storm Par investor
- Paul Scheer as airport traffic police
- Stephen Oyoung as Mike, a member of Javi's team
- James Paxton as Cody, an unhappy motel guest

== Production ==
=== Development ===
In 2020, Joseph Kosinski met with Amblin Entertainment and the Kennedy/Marshall Company to pitch a follow-up to the 1996 film Twister revolving around a "new generation" of storm chasers. In June 2020, Universal Pictures announced it was meeting with writers to develop the reboot, with Frank Marshall attached as a producer and Kosinski in early negotiations as director. Around the same time, the studio rejected plans from Twister actress Helen Hunt to direct a sequel. That version, written by Hunt, Rafael Casal, and Daveed Diggs, who collaborated on the television series Blindspotting, would have followed "all black and brown storm chasers", members of a rocket science club at a historically black college and university.

In October 2022, Amblin, Universal, and Warner Bros. met with directors for Twisters, a sequel being fast-tracked for an early 2023 production start after Steven Spielberg, an executive producer of the original film, expressed enthusiasm for a script by Mark L. Smith. Filmmaking couple Jimmy Chin and Elizabeth Chai Vasarhelyi, Travis Knight, and Dan Trachtenberg were in talks to helm the project, Kosinski having dropped out to direct F1 (2025). The studio reportedly wanted Hunt to reprise her role, with the hopes of the story focusing on the daughter of her and Bill Paxton's characters.

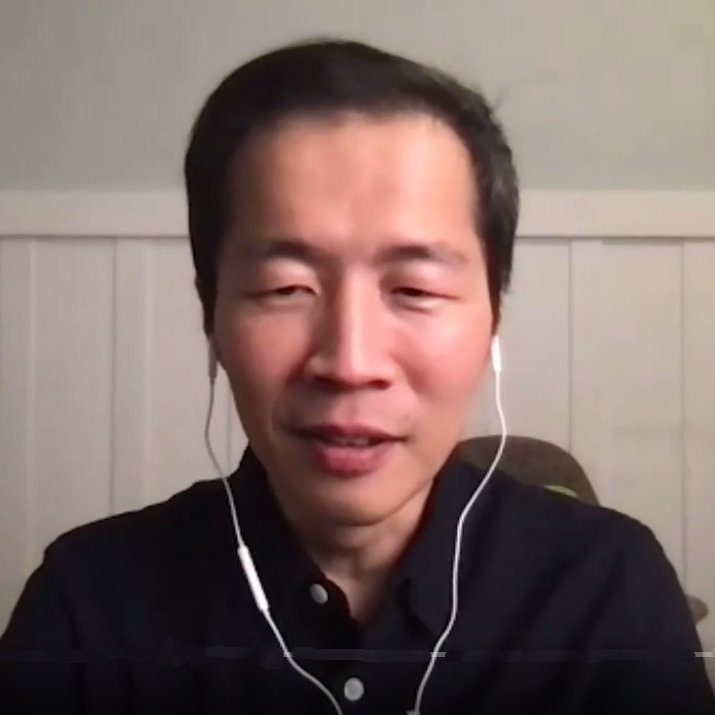
The studio film Twisters was director Lee Isaac Chung's next film after the indie drama Minari. Both films were shot in Oklahoma.

In December 2022, Lee Isaac Chung was hired to direct the now standalone sequel. Chung's pitch to Marshall, Spielberg, and executive producer Ashley Jay Sandberg included a presentation that intercut footage from Twister and his own Minari, a semi-autobiographical indie drama that cost $2 million, specifically a scene in which characters experience a tornado watch. Chung credited his time at Lucasfilm directing an episode of The Mandalorian as accustoming him to projects with visual effects and noted growing up in Tornado Alley as inspiration. In preparation for Twisters, he revisited the original film; Spielberg's Jaws (1975) and War of the Worlds (2005) (described by him as "movies about powerful forces of nature or monstrous things coming at you or looming above you"); "driving movies" such as The French Connection (1971) and Gone in 60 Seconds (2000); and Akira Kurosawa's Seven Samurai (1954) and Ran (1985) (for inspiration in capturing weather through camera movement). Character dynamics were influenced by the films of Frank Capra and Howard Hawks, especially It Happened One Night (1934) and The Big Sky (1952).

Chung was inspired to approach Glen Powell for a lead role after seeing an appearance of his on an episode of the morning show Today; Powell was contacted while filming Anyone but You (2023) in Australia to do a chemistry read with Daisy Edgar-Jones over Zoom. Edgar-Jones suggested that her character, Kate, have a camera, in reference to the documentary Fire of Love (2022) about volcanologists Katia and Maurice Krafft; the character was partially inspired by Dorothy Gale in The Wizard of Oz (1939). For Kate's wardrobe, Lee said that Edgar-Jones drew inspiration from the "bad-ass women of cinema", which included Furiosa from Mad Max: Fury Road (2015), Ellen Ripley from Alien (1979) and Louise Sawyer and Thelma Dickinson from Thelma & Louise (1991). Cast members attended a "weather boot camp" to learn about tornadoes from meteorologists and storm chasers. The program was organized by meteorologist and former NOAA analyst Kevin Kelleher, a technical advisor on both Twister films. Paxton's son, James, has a cameo as a motel guest who tries driving away from a tornado. Powell's parents also appear as cameos during the rodeo scene, an occurrence that previously happened in all of his films, starting with Spy Kids 3-D: Game Over (2003) where James Paxton also appears in a cameo and also his debut acting feature.

=== Filming ===
Principal photography was initially set for the state of Georgia, outside Atlanta, for budgetary reasons. Instead, it commenced in May 2023 in Oklahoma, where the story takes place, marking Chung's return to the state after Minari. The move cost the crew work days and resulted in the removal of some storm sequences. Filming was to take place at Prairie Surf Studios for 40 days and in metro Oklahoma City for 50 days. Ultimately, the shoot took 60 days, approximately 70 percent of which was spent capturing driving scenes. Other locations included the towns of Burbank, Calumet, Cashion, Chickasha, Fairview, Hinton, Kingfisher, Kremlin, El Reno, Midwest City, Okarche, Pawhuska, and Spencer. Filming was suspended in July due to the SAG-AFTRA strike. As six weeks of prep time were necessary to resume production, despite only having three weeks of material to film, the crew began prepping sets before the strike was over. Production resumed with the strike's conclusion in November and wrapped the following month. Dan Mindel was the cinematographer. Patrick Sullivan, who worked on the original film's art department, was the production designer.

Twisters was shot on 35 mm film, at Chung's request after receiving support from Spielberg and Mindel, with Panavision Panaflex Millennium XL2 and handheld Arriflex 435 and 235 cameras from Arri, using Panavision T-Series, C-Series and Primo anamorphic lenses. In preparation for the film, Mindel watched Westerns, road films, and films produced during the Golden Age of Hollywood set in rural America. He listed The Last Picture Show (1971) as an influence on the film's "Americana" style. Dailies were processed in Los Angeles, so the crew could not review their footage for several days. To maintain continuity, Mindel aimed to film under overcast weather, unless the script asked for blue skies. Because the shoot occurred during tornado season, delays were frequent. "It was happening every three days or so," Chung recalled, "We were always getting shut down—lightning, wind storms, and then storms that were producing tornadoes came through as well."

Challenges arose in El Reno due to heat waves, lightning storms, and strong winds, as well as the presence of "a jet engine on set that you could barely talk over" and the need for a bright, hot key light to produce the "feeling of a storm-like sky", according to Chung. A set of an El Reno farmer's market was destroyed by a storm with 80-mile-per-hour winds, forcing the crew to rebuild it so they could destroy it again for a scene. The farmer's market in El Reno consisted of 40 vendors and market stalls. Many of them were inspired from different local farmer's markets, featuring produce sellers, baked goods and local artisans. The set decorating team manufactured, researched and met with local farmers and vendors from all over Oklahoma. Fake versions of the goods, including pies, vegetables and cakes were created using soft and safe materials to avoid hurting the cast and crew by the wind and water machines. A former military meteorologist was hired to monitor weather conditions with a squad of radar watchers, and film safety experts enforced protocols for shutting down production and sheltering when necessary.

The prologue was shot during the first week. It used practical effects such as hail, rain, and wind machines to simulate the storm, though the overpass that characters hide under was enclosed in blue screen. While parts of the sequence were filmed on location, the overpass was rebuilt on a makeshift studio backlot near Prairie Surf Studios. Three locations—Crystal Springs, Stillwater, and El Reno–are ravaged in the film by tornadoes. Scenes set in El Reno were filmed on location, while a 4-block stretch of land in Chickasha stood in for Crystal Springs and Midwest City portrayed Stillwater. Early versions of the script had the Stillwater tornado surround a college baseball game, but Chung suggested changing it to a rodeo. For the rodeo, a metal-roofed grand stand, a ticket booth, an announcer booth, concession booths and a small marketplace with a few vendors were constructed. The walls were also dressed with faded Hatch Show Print posters that consisted of iconic woodblock prints that promoted music stars such as Elvis Presley and Dolly Parton to suggest history and a faded "Americana" vibe. The pool of the motel where characters take shelter was constructed for the film; a hole was dug out of the motel's lawn and, since the pool is empty, no plumbing was required. After the shoot, the pool was removed and the hole was filled to restore the lawn. The theater sequence was shot on soundstages at Prairie Surf, using vintage seats from a closed Colorado movie theater; exterior shots were filmed in El Reno. It was Chung's decision for the characters to be viewing Frankenstein (1931), a reference to Universal's "monsters" franchise. Kate's mother's farmhouse was located in the town of Howe. The accompanying barn was initially a metal shed, which the art department skinned with wood from Missouri to resemble an Oklahoma barn. The barn's interior was built at Prairie Surf. Two versions of the ending were filmed; one where Kate and Tyler kiss, and the one in the film, in which they do not. Spielberg suggested the non-kiss take to solidify that Kate's character arc was about her returning passion for storm chasing. Automaker Stellantis provided several vehicles for use in the film, including a Ram 1500 TRX and a Ram 3500 used by Powell's character Tyler Owens as a Tornado Intercept Vehicle.

=== Post-production ===
The film's tornadoes were created using special and visual effects, referencing footage of supercell clouds and real tornadoes shot by technical consultants, including storm chaser Sean Casey. The tornado in the finale was inspired by the 2013 El Reno tornado, the 2021 Western Kentucky tornado, and a wedge tornado that struck Kansas in 2023. Scott R. Fisher and Ben Snow were the special and visual effects supervisors, respectively. Special effects included wind fans running at around 70 miles per hour; two jet engines operating further away from the sets at 170-to-180 miles per hour; dump tanks; high-pressure pneumatic water cannons; and polyacrylamide for hail. Visual effects were handled by Industrial Light & Magic.

Terilyn A. Shropshire was the editor. Chung said the most challenging part about making Twisters was balancing the tone because he wanted to entertain audiences while simultaneously taking the natural disasters seriously due to their real-world impacts. In June 2023, amid filming, The Oklahoman reported the production budget for Twisters as nearing $200 million. In July 2024, the budget was listed as $155 million before print and advertising costs.

== Music ==
Benjamin Wallfisch composed the film's score. The soundtrack, Twisters: The Album, was released on July 19, 2024, on CD, LP, and digital download by Atlantic Records. It features 29 songs from primarily country acts, including Luke Combs, Miranda Lambert, Bailey Zimmerman, Megan Moroney, Tucker Wetmore, Tanner Adell, Jelly Roll, and Leon Bridges ("Chrome Cowgirl"), and others. Combs' "Ain't No Love in Oklahoma" led the soundtrack as a single on May 16, with few singles released in the subsequent weeks prior to the film's release.

== Release ==
Twisters premiered at Cineworld Leicester Square in London on July 8, 2024. Notably attending the event was Tom Cruise, who worked with Powell on Top Gun: Maverick in 2022. The film also screened at the Taormina Film Fest in Italy in July 2024. The film was released in the United States by Universal Pictures on July 19, 2024, and early in some international markets by Warner Bros. Pictures, beginning on July 10. It was also released through digital formats by Universal Pictures Home Entertainment on August 13, 2024, and on 4K, Blu-ray, and DVD by the latter and Warner Bros. Home Entertainment (under joint venture Studio Distribution Services) on October 22. Twisters streamed on NBCUniversal's Peacock on November 15, 2024.

== Marketing ==
The Twisters soundtrack accumulated over 175 million streams between May 29, 2024, and its theatrical release; Universal released one song per week for ten weeks, then a song per day the final week. In addition, the studio partnered with radio personality Bobby Bones. Sporting events were significant in raising awareness to the film. Universal worked with NASCAR for co-branded promo as well as MLB, Copa América, and WWE. The 30-second television spot broadcast during Super Bowl LVIII amassed 29.2 million views in a day and was among the year's most-watched Super Bowl trailers. Commercials for the film aired during events for All Elite Wrestling, NASCAR, the Olympic Trials, UEFA Euro Cup, UFC, and the WNBA. Universal strategically put tickets on sales during the first game of the 2024 NBA Finals, made content with Dodge RAM and Wrangler, and had the cast participate in a cross-country promotional tour that exceeded New York and Los Angeles and made stops in Dallas, Chicago, and Miami. Special screenings were held in Oklahoma and military bases, and discussions were held between the cast and meteorologists. As a result of the marketing, Deadline Hollywood noted that the film's top-grossing cities during its opening weekend were Dallas, Houston, Phoenix, Atlanta, Oklahoma City, and San Antonio, and that theater chains in Middle America like B&B Theatres and Santikos Theatres surged over annual norms. The publication also said the film's "not political" standing (by not referring to climate change) appealed to "red states"; despite it, PostTrak reported that of opening weekend moviegoers, 16% were registered Democrats while 7% were registered Republicans. The highest-grossing theater that weekend was Regal Warren in Moore, Oklahoma, at over $130,000.

== Reception ==
=== Box office ===
Twisters grossed $267.8 million in the United States and Canada, and $104.5 million in other territories, for a worldwide total of $372.3 million.

In the United States and Canada, Twisters was projected to gross $40–55 million from 4,151 theaters in its opening weekend. After it made $32.1 million on its first day, including an estimated $10.7 million from Wednesday and Thursday previews, projections were raised to $75 million. It went on to debut to $81.3 million, the best-ever opening weekend for a natural disaster film, surpassing The Day After Tomorrow (2004). At the time, the film had the third-highest opening weekend of 2024, behind Inside Out 2 ($154.2 million) and Dune: Part Two ($82.5 million). Of that opening, $2.1 million came from 4DX screenings, a record for the format, surpassing The Super Mario Bros. Movie (2023); this record was surpassed the following week by Deadpool & Wolverine. Twisters ended its box office run as the eighth highest-grossing film of 2024 in the U.S. and Canada.

Because of its success in the format, Twisters returned to 4DX theaters alongside the original film from August 30 to September 5. The film earned $35 million and $22.8 million in its second and third weekends, respectively, both times behind Deadpool & Wolverine. During its seventh weekend, as the film was released on PVOD, the film ranked number three at the box office behind the latter film and Alien: Romulus, experiencing a 27% box office increase from the previous week. The film's domestic performance was credited to Universal's marketing, which sold the movie on Powell's star power and the option to see the film on 4DX; of its total earnings, only around 28% came from international markets (for reference, the original Twister earned half of its box office internationally).

In the United Kingdom, the film opened in second place behind Despicable Me 4, making £4.1 million.

=== Critical response ===
On review aggregation website Rotten Tomatoes, 75% of 397 critics' reviews are positive, with an average rating of 6.70/10. The website's critical consensus reads: "Summoning a storm of spectacle and carried along by the gale force winds of Glen Powell's charisma, Twisters' forecast is splendid with a high chance of thrills." According to the website, critics felt that Chung added "more substance" to the film and praised the film's visuals and "unexpectedly well-handled romantic twist", calling it a "rousing piece of summer blockbuster cinema". Metacritic, which uses a weighted average, assigned the film a score of 65 out of 100, based on 57 critics, indicating "generally favorable" reviews. Audiences surveyed by CinemaScore gave the film an average grade of "A-" on an A+ to F scale, the same score as the first film, while PostTrak reported filmgoers gave it 4.5 out of five stars.

Robbie Collin of The Daily Telegraph gave it a score of five out of five, writing that it "vastly improves on [the original] in all regards". Writing for Entertainment Weekly, Jordan Hoffman gave the film a "A-" grade, saying "There's a ton of technobabble that you have to take on faith, but Jones and Powell do more than sell it; they make it compelling". Odie Henderson of The Boston Globe earned a two-and-a-half out of four rating, stating that "watching the sequel is like playing Mad Libs with the original's plot". IndieWire's David Ehrlich gave the film a "B+" grade and said "And for all of the unearned goodwill that Twisters extends to viral content creators, it still makes one of this summer's most emphatic arguments in favor of the big screen experience". Donald Clarke of The Irish Times gave it a rating of three out of five, describing it as "a sequel that, while no masterpiece, feels perfectly serviceable in the era of lore-addicted trash such as Ghostbusters: Frozen Empire".

Owen Gleiberman of Variety gave the film a mixed review. He praised the performances of Powell and Edgar-Jones, but suggested the film was not as innovative as the original film given the prevalence of the Internet and actual videos of tornadoes freely available. He wrote, "Staring up at the tornadoes in Twisters, I felt like I'd already seen something exactly like them — and that when it comes to footage of actual tornadoes, I'd already seen something more incredible".

=== Scientific accuracy ===
The producers of Twisters consulted with the National Oceanic and Atmospheric Administration during development, with the federal agency contributing logos and props built by Dr. Sean Waugh. The agency added that its contribution to scientific accuracy was only reflected "in some parts" of the film. A scientific review in The New York Times pointed out impossibilities with the film's mechanism for dissipating tornadoes, observing that the method suggested would require many tons of the chemicals used and require a much longer period. A professor at Texas A&M University also remarked: "it's highly unlikely that the small-scale methods depicted in the movie would have any real impact on tornadoes. To my knowledge, no one is actively pursuing such an approach". An article in Wired noted that the "twin" tornadoes featured in the film do occur in real-life as multiple-vortex tornadoes, drawing comparison to the Dunlap, Indiana tornado during the 1965 Palm Sunday tornado outbreak.

Writer Margaret Renkl criticized the film for not mentioning the link between climate change and the increasing frequency and intensity of tornadoes. Despite Smith's intent for the screenplay to incorporate the effects of climate change, Chung explained his decision to avoid explicitly referring to climate change as wanting "to make sure that we are never creating a feeling that we're preaching a message." According to Chung, Universal wanted him to put forward a clear message about climate change, but scientific advisors on the project suggested that he be more measured, because the link between tornado severity and climate change remains unclear.

== Accolades ==
Award	Date of ceremony	Category	Recipient(s)	Result	Ref.
Hollywood Music in Media Awards	November 20, 2024	Best Original Song – Feature Film	Luke Dick, Shane McAnally & Lainey Wilson ("Out of Oklahoma")	Nominated	
Hollywood Music in Media Awards	November 20, 2024	Music Supervision – Film	Rachel Levy	Nominated	
Hollywood Music in Media Awards	November 20, 2024	Soundtrack Album	Twisters: The Album	Nominated	
Astra Film and Creative Arts Awards	December 8, 2024	Best Action or Science Fiction Feature	Twisters	Nominated	
Astra Film and Creative Arts Awards	December 8, 2024	Best Visual Effects	Twisters	Nominated	
Golden Globe Awards	January 5, 2025	Cinematic and Box Office Achievement	Twisters	Nominated	
Satellite Awards	January 26, 2025	Best Sound (Editing and Mixing)	Christopher Boyes, Pete Horner, Al Nelson, and Bjørn Ole Schroeder	Nominated	
Saturn Awards	February 2, 2025	Best Action or Adventure Film	Twisters	Nominated	
Saturn Awards	February 2, 2025	Best Film Special Effects	Twisters	Nominated	
Visual Effects Society Awards	February 11, 2025	Outstanding Visual Effects in a Photoreal Feature	Ben Snow, Mark Soper, Florian Witzel, Susan Greenhow, Scott Fisher	Nominated	
Visual Effects Society Awards	February 11, 2025	Outstanding Effects Simulations in a Photoreal Feature	Matthew Hanger, Joakim Arnesson, Laurent Kermel, Zheng Yong Oh	Nominated	
Society of Composers & Lyricists	February 12, 2025	Outstanding Original Song for a Comedy or Musical Visual Media Production	Lainey Wilson, Luke Dick, Shane McAnally ("Out of Oklahoma")	Nominated	
Movieguide Awards	March 6, 2025	Best Movie for Mature Audiences	Twisters	Nominated	
