= The Burning Zone =

American television series (1996–97 season)

- Genre: Science fiction drama
- Created by: Coleman Luck
- Starring: James Black; Michael Harris; Jeffrey Dean Morgan; Tamlyn Tomita; Bradford Tatum
- Country of origin: United States
- Original language: English
- No. of seasons: 1
- No. of episodes: 19

Production
- Executive producers: Coleman Luck; James Duff McAdams; Carleton Eastlake; Rob Gilmer
- Running time: 60 minutes
- Production companies: Sandstar Productions; Universal Television

Original release
- Network: UPN
- Release: September 3, 1996 – May 20, 1997

The Burning Zone is an American science fiction drama television series created by Coleman Luck that originally aired for one season on UPN from September 3, 1996 to May 20, 1997. The series follows a government task force assigned to investigate chemical and biological threats. Initially, the program focused on the virologist Edward Marcase (Jeffrey Dean Morgan) and Dr. Kimberly Shiroma (Tamlyn Tomita). In January 1997, after the 11th episode (of 19), and in response to the show's low ratings, the characters Marcase and Shiroma were dropped from the series. Dr. Daniel Cassian (Michael Harris) became the lead character, and a new character, Dr. Brian Taft (Bradford Tatum), joined the task force. The Burning Zone initially incorporated supernatural and religious elements but shifted towards more action-oriented storylines.

The series was the only drama ordered by UPN for the 1996–97 television season. It was paired with the sitcoms Moesha and Homeboys in Outer Space. The Burning Zone has never been released on DVD or Blu-ray or made available on online-streaming services. Critical response to The Burning Zone was primarily negative; commentators were divided over its storylines and tone. It received negative comparisons to other science-fiction shows of the time, especially The X-Files. Kasumi Mihori and Billy Pittard were nominated for the Primetime Emmy Award for Outstanding Main Title Design for the 49th Primetime Emmy Awards for their contributions to the series.

== Premise and characters ==
The main characters for the first 11 episodes of the series from left to right: Michael Hailey, Dr. Kimberly Shiroma, Dr. Daniel Cassian, and Edward Marcase. The characters Shiroma and Marcase were dropped from the series for the final eight episodes.

The Burning Zone is a science-fiction drama about a task force that investigates biochemical emergencies. Funded by the United States government, the team includes a virologist, a geneticist, a security specialist, and a bureaucrat. Set during a global rise in lethal diseases, known as the Plague Wars, the show includes hard science storylines resolved through spiritual solutions, including the efficacy of prayer and the power of a "healthy soul". When discussing the show's premise, critics had varying opinions on its inspiration. Comparisons were drawn to television films, B movies, and news headlines, and the Chicago Tribune's Allan Johnson summed up The Burning Zone as a "mutant-disease-of-the-week series".

The task force includes virologist Edward Marcase (Jeffrey Dean Morgan) who survived a case of Ebola virus disease as a child, although his parents died from the virus. Devoting his life to researching the virus, he approaches the process of handling and curing a diseases as a "mystical experience" or a "supernatural quest". Johnson likened Marcase to Fox Mulder, a fictional character from The X-Files, due to his "almost mystical relationship with diseases". Caryn James of The New York Times wrote that Morgan played Marcase with "a brooding style". Marcase works closely with Dr. Kimberly Shiroma (Tamlyn Tomita), who specialized in molecular genetics and pathology during her time at the World Health Organization. She blames Marcase for her fiancé's death. James compared Marcase's relationship with Shiroma to that between The X-Files' Mulder and Dana Scully. The team's other members include Michael Hailey (James Black) and Dr. Daniel Cassian (Michael Harris). Hailey handles the task force's security, while using his previous work experience with the Central Intelligence Agency. The group's leader Cassian is portrayed as a "no-nonsense doctor" with a high security clearance and a "firm grip over his emotions".

In response to the show's low ratings, United Paramount Network (UPN) removed Marcase and Shiroma with "only the briefest of explanations". Cassain subsequently became the lead character, despite previously being portrayed as "a kind of Dr. Smith-like thorn in the side". Critic John Kenneth Muir referred to the casting changes as "a behind-the-scenes massacre". Dr. Brian Taft (Bradford Tatum) was added to the show after Marcase and Shiroma's exit. Muir described Taft as "a motorcycle-riding, rebellious James Dean-like physician". Storylines shifted away from supernatural cases to include more action. Science fiction writers Roger Fulton and John Gregory Betancourt wrote that the program had "so many transformations in its brief 19-episode run that no viewer who saw the first show would recognize the last". Morgan and Tomita appear in 11 episodes while Todd Susman was in two episodes. Black appears in all 19 episodes, and Harris and Tatum are in 18 episodes and eight episodes, respectively.

== Production and broadcast history ==
Produced by Universal Television, The Burning Zone was created by Coleman Luck, who was an executive producer alongside James Duff McAdams and Carleton Eastlake. Consultation for the episodes was provided by an infectious-disease expert, Dr. Kimberly A. Shriner. One of six shows ordered by UPN, The Burning Zone was the network's only new drama for the 1996–97 television season. It was the final program announced as a part of UPN's 1996-97 line-up.

John Kenneth Muir cited The Burning Zone as an example of how the mid-1990s was "the great era of 'virus'-centric pop-culture entertainment". According to John Carman of the San Francisco Chronicle, The Burning Zone was one of the eight shows ordered for the 1996–97 television season that could be "classified as science fiction or at least very strange". Critics frequently compared the series to The X-Files. In the 1999 book Gen X TV: The Brady Bunch to Melrose Place, journalist Rob Owen described The Burning Zone as part of a 1996 trend of "X-Files rejects" that included Dark Skies and Millennium. The show also received comparisons to the 1995 film Outbreak and the 1971 film The Andromeda Strain.

The Burning Zone was broadcast on Tuesday nights at 9 pm EST, airing with the sitcoms Moesha and Homeboys in Outer Space. UPN included references to The X-Files in the promotional materials for the show. In a University of California, Los Angeles report, senior fellow Harlan Lebo wrote that The Burning Zone is one of two shows, along with The Sentinel, in the 1996–97 television season that received complaints for its use of violence. The network canceled The Burning Zone, and rescheduled Tuesday nights with four additional sitcoms, including Clueless. In 2012, Muir called for the show's release on home media, along with Sleepwalkers and Prey, but it has never been released on DVD or Blu-ray, or licensed to an online streaming service.

== Episodes ==
No.	Title	Directed by	Written by	Original release date
1	"Pilot"	Bradford May	Coleman Luck	September 3, 1996
An archeologist is infected by a sentient 15,000-year-old virus from an ancient Costa Rican tomb, which causes superhuman strength, fever, and red eyes. The White House organizes a team to stop the infection from spreading further.
2	"The Silent Tower"	Michael Lange	Coleman Luck	September 10, 1996
A chemical agent causes a mass spontaneous suicide in a Chicago high-rise building. The team investigates the chemical's inventor who disappeared in 1967 and go through his office in the building. A member of the team is poisoned by the chemical and the others search for a cure.
3	"St. Michael's Nightmare"	Scott Brazil	Robert Gilmer	September 17, 1996
A priest loses his faith in God after meeting Dr. Dicketts during the St. Michael's Festival. While attending the festival, the team investigates an annual virus outbreak that causes outbursts of violence.
4	"Arms of Fire"	Michael Katleman	G. Coleman Luck III	September 24, 1996
The team investigates a case in which a boy spontaneous combusts and discover it was caused by a pharmaceutical company and its medical studies on high school students. Marcase and Shiroma work together to create a vaccine for a virus.
5	"Night Flight"	Jesús Salvador Treviño	Carleton Eastlake	October 1, 1996
The passengers of a Boeing 747 are affected by a hemorrhagic fever. The team build a laboratory in the aircraft's cargo hold and focus on keeping the pilots alive long enough for them to land the plane.
6	"Lethal Injection"	Richard Compton	Coleman Luck & Carel Cage Luck	October 15, 1996
Death row inmates are used in a medical program that causes a string of mysterious deaths. Edward Marcase voluntarily takes a sedative to induce a temporary death and encounters God.
7	"Touch of the Dead"	Oscar L. Costo	Robert Gilmer	October 29, 1996
Dr. Daniel Cassian becomes infected by a Mayan virus; Marcase and Dr. Kimberly Shiroma race to find a cure for him. Michael Hailey looks for Cassian's ex-lover who had previously contracted the virus.
8	"Hall of the Serpent"	Michael Lange	Coleman Luck & Carel Cage Luck	November 12, 1996
Cassian is concerned about his sick niece after she seeks medical treatment from a faith healer and lives in his compound. Marcase takes drugs that make him appear sickly, sneaks into the compound, and investigates the faith healer's true nature.
9	"Blood Covenant"	Oscar L. Costo	Story by : G. Coleman Luck III & Kimberly A. Shriner; Teleplay by : G. Coleman Luck III	November 19, 1996
In Orlando, Florida, a man contaminates the blood supply with malaria and places the blame on the blood bank's director.
10	"Faces in the Night"	Scott Brazil	Carleton Eastlake	November 26, 1996
Shiroma is kidnapped by a serial killer during the full moon. The rest of the team must save her before the next full moon occurs.
11	"Midnight of the Carrier"	Janet Greek	Carleton Eastlake	January 7, 1997
The team is charged with protecting a former Nazi from white supremacists seeking to create a highly destructive weapon.
12	"Critical Mass"	Richard Compton	Carleton Eastlake & James G. Hirsch	January 28, 1997
Shiroma and Marcase are reassigned, and Cassian recruits Dr. Brian Taft to replace them. The new team investigates a meteorite after people who touch it start killing one another.
13	"Death Song"	Michael Miller	Robert Gilmer	February 4, 1997
Multiple cases of bone demineralization are reported to the team; Michael Hailey believes they are connected to a famous singer.
14	"The Last Endless Summer"	Stephen L. Posey	James G. Hirsch	February 11, 1997
The team is tasked with investigating a group of California surfers who are all experiencing organ failure.
15	"The Last Five Pounds Are the Hardest"	Michael Miller	Carleton Eastlake	February 18, 1997
A new diet fad causes deadly side effects and the team attempts to track down the cause and a curse.
16	"Elegy for a Dream"	Nancy Malone	Michael Gleason	April 29, 1997
Taft's nephew is infected by flesh-eating bacteria; the team discovers that it was spread in major hospitals through Yugoslavian tattoos. They try to find the source of the bacteria.
17	"A Secret in the Neighborhood"	Michael Miller	Bart Baker	May 6, 1997
People become sick because of a chemical stored in a military base. A militia plots to steal the chemical and weaponize it.
18	"Wild Fire"	Stephen L. Posey	David Kemper	May 13, 1997
An outbreak of drug-resistant cholera occurs in Detroit because of contaminated pearls. During the investigation, Hailey must look back at his childhood in Detroit.
19	"On Wings of Angels"	Richard Compton	James G. Hirsch	May 20, 1997
A group of prisoners become sick during medical experiments; their leader escapes and kidnaps Taft to treat them. Cassian and Hailey try to rescue Taft as the prisoners threaten to kill him.

== Critical reception ==
The critical response was primarily negative. Ken Tucker of Entertainment Weekly called the show "stiff, pretentious blarney" and an "unhealthy hugger-mugger", and cited its dialogue as one of its weaknesses. Bret Watson, writing for the same publication, dismissed The Burning Zone as "sci-fi schlock-fest". During a negative review of the special effects, Caryn James wrote that the "supposedly new microbe-imaging system look[ed] like the inside of a multicolored lava lamp". Scott D. Pierce panned the show's storylines for going "into the realm of ridiculous fantasy", and negatively compared the characters and dialogue to those of a soap opera. Allan Johnson criticized The Burning Zone as a poor replacement for UPN's previous series Nowhere Man, and requested that the network cancel The Burning Zone to revive Nowhere Man. In his review of the pilot, Johnson criticized Morgan's beard for making him appear "like he spent more time at college kegger parties than studying germs". John Kenneth Muir called The Burning Zone "a one-season blunder".

Some critics had more positive remarks for The Burning Zone. Kasumi Mihori and Billy Pittard received a nomination for the Primetime Emmy Award for Outstanding Main Title Design for the 49th Primetime Emmy Awards for their work on the show's main title. James Endrst praised the production, though he had a more mixed response for the show's "B-level stars and performances". Caryn James praised the episodes for containing "the loopy delights of a cut-rate, over-the-top horror movie", but questioned their intended tone due to the actors' serious portrayals of their characters. James felt that the show should have embraced "its silliest, campiest instincts".
