= Sean Waugh =

American meteorologist

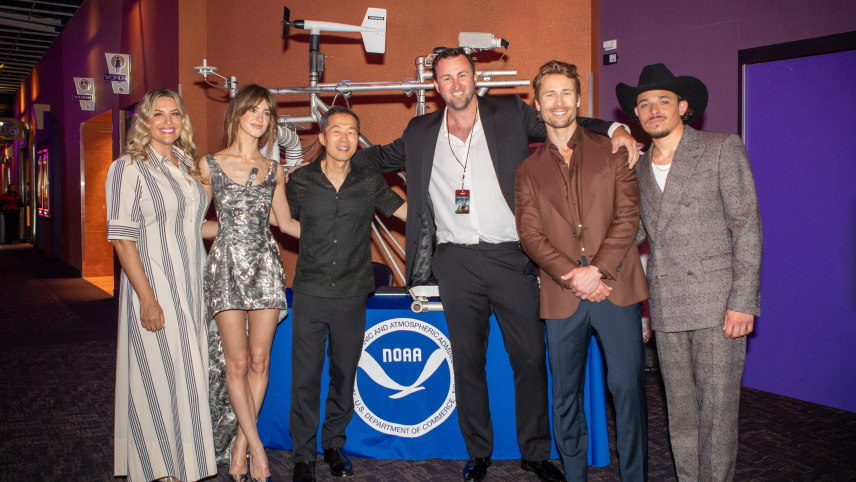
- Sean Waugh (fourth from left) standing next to the cast and director of Twisters
- Occupation: Meteorologist
- Known for: Severe weather research; Tornado consultant on Twisters; Storm chasing

Sean Waugh is an American meteorologist and research scientist with the National Severe Storms Laboratory (NSSL), the research branch of the National Oceanic and Atmospheric Administration (NOAA) for severe weather.

== Education ==
Waugh received a Bachelor, Masters, and a PhD in meteorology from the University of Oklahoma.

== Career ==
In August 2020, Waugh was part of a four-scientist team researching Hurricane Laura from the air, land, on the internet, and through computer models. Waugh launched weather balloons, which measured winds up to 140 miles per hour (225 km/h).

Between March 2023–July 2024, Waugh worked as a Tornado Consultant for Universal Pictures, building props and consulting on Twisters, an American disaster film starring Daisy Edgar-Jones, Glen Powell, and Anthony Ramos.

In 2024, Waugh constructed the NSSL Hail Camera Truck, as a way to research hail. The truck is equipped with two cameras and eight LED spotlights, which are 30% brighter than the sun.
