= Luther the Geek =

- DVD cover
- Directed by: Carlton J. Albright
- Screenplay by: Carlton J. Albright
- Produced by: David Platt
- Starring: Edward Terry; Stacy Haiduk; Joan Roth
- Cinematography: David Knox
- Edited by: Rick Smigielski
- Music by: Vern Carlson
- Production company: Albright/Platt films
- Distributed by: Quest Entertainment
- Release date: July 1, 1989 (Limited release)
- Running time: 80 minutes
- Country: United States
- Language: English

Luther the Geek (Alternately spelled Luther, the Freak) is a 1989 American horror film directed by Carlton J. Albright and released by Troma Entertainment. It stars Edward Terry in the title role, with Stacy Haiduk and Joan Roth playing supporting roles.

In the film, a man fascinated with carnival geeks starts decapitating people with his metallic dentures. Following his release from prison, he invades a farm and takes two female hostages, but one of the hostages fights back and kills him.

== Plot ==
A young Luther Watts has a fascination with carnival geeks. When he loses his teeth while at a geek show and has them replaced with a pair of sharp metallic dentures, he acquires a liking for human blood. He begins murdering people by biting their heads off, but is captured and placed in prison.

After being in prison for over twenty years, Luther is paroled and released. He begins roaming around his hometown, killing people by eating off their heads. Luther invades a farm, where he holds a mother and her daughter captive. Eventually, he is shot dead by the mother while inside the farm's chicken coop.

== Cast ==
- Edward Terry as The Freak
- Joan Roth as Hilary
- Stacy Haiduk as Beth
- Thomas Mills as Rob
- Jerry Clarke as Trooper
- Tom Brittingham as Geek
- Carlton Williams as Little Luther

== Production ==
Luther the Geek was filmed in Tampico, Illinois and Sterling, Illinois.

Edward Terry, who portrayed Luther, only stood 5 ft 7 in (1.70 m) in height and weighed 160 pounds (73 kg), so cameras were strategically placed to give the illusion that Luther was larger than Terry was. In addition, the elderly woman that Luther murders outside of the grocery store was, in actuality, a young woman in a wig and makeup. However, Luther the Geek's makeup artist requested to not be credited on the film.

== Release ==
=== Home media ===
Luther the Geek was released on DVD by Troma Entertainment, as a special Director's Cut on February 22, 2005. It was later released on DVD and Blu-ray by Vinegar Syndrome on January 19, 2016.

Though the film was sold and resold to numerous entities, the actors were never paid their Screen Actors Guild residuals for this film. Indeed, it still airs on streaming services without honoring payments decades overdue to the union cast.

== Critical reception ==
Luther the Geek received mostly negative reviews from critics.

Richard Sopko of HorrorNews.net stated that the film was "aimed at only those looking to view the complete Troma repertoire", calling it "a strange mix of sadism and comedy with a low budget and little talent". VideoHound's Cult Flicks & Trash Pics called the film "[a] pointless, sadistic, stupid horror sleaze". Dennis Schwartz of Ozus' World Movie Reviews rated the film a grade C, calling it "a thoroughly awful film that just might have an appeal to those who find the freak (Edward Terry) intriguing and don't care about the sloppy plot, terrible acting, or of how dumb it is even for the usual exploitation film.".

The film was not without its supporters. In his book Slimetime: A Guide to Sleazy, Mindless Movies, Steven Puchalski praised Luther the Geek, saying: "Good title. Good film. And it managed to avoid being your basic slasherama with its wonderful title character." It was later included in Adam Lukeman's 101 Best Horror Movies You've Never Seen.
