= Mark L. Smith =

American screenwriter

- Born: Colorado, U.S.
- Occupations: Screenwriter; film director; film producer
- Years active: 2005–present

Mark L. Smith is an American screenwriter, film producer, and director. His screenwriting credits includes Vacancy (2007), The Revenant (2015), Overlord (2018), The Midnight Sky (2020), The Boys in the Boat (2023), and Twisters (2024), and the TV miniseries American Primeval and Untamed (both 2025).

== Career ==
Smith wrote and directed the 2006 film Séance, which won the Festival Prize at the Eureka Springs Digital Film Festival and the Horror Genre Award at ShockFest. Since then, he has worked as a screenwriter.

Smith's writing credits include the 2007 horror film Vacancy and its prequel, Vacancy 2: The First Cut, and the 2009 Joe Dante film The Hole. Together with Alejandro González Iñárritu, he co-wrote The Revenant, based in part on the novel of the same name by Michael Punke. The film stars Leonardo DiCaprio, Tom Hardy, and Will Poulter. Shooting began in September 2014. The film was released on December 25, 2015.

== Filmography ==
=== Film ===
Year	Title	Writer	Producer	Director
2006	Séance	Yes	No	Himself
2007	Vacancy	Yes	No	Nimród Antal
2008	Vacancy 2: The First Cut	Yes	No	Eric Bross
2009	The Hole	Yes	No	Joe Dante
2015	Martyrs	Yes	No	Kevin Goetz; Michael Goetz
2015	The Revenant	Yes	No	Alejandro G. Iñárritu
2018	Overlord	Yes	No	Julius Avery
2020	The Midnight Sky	Yes	No	George Clooney
2023	The Marsh King's Daughter	Yes	Yes	Neil Burger
2023	The Boys in the Boat	Yes	No	George Clooney
2024	Twisters	Yes	No	Lee Isaac Chung
2026	The Dog Stars	Yes	Yes	Ridley Scott
2026	The Mosquito Bowl	Yes	No	Peter Berg

Additional literary material

- Lou (2022)

=== Television ===
Year	Title	Writer	Creator	Executive producer	Notes
2025	American Primeval	Yes	Yes	Yes	Miniseries
2025–present	Untamed	Yes	Yes	Yes	
