= Séance (2006 film) =

- Film poster
- Directed by: Mark L. Smith
- Written by: Mark L. Smith
- Starring: Bridget Shergalis; Tori White; Chauntal Lewis; Adrian Paul; AJ Lamas
- Cinematography: Geoffrey Schaaf
- Music by: Vincent Gillioz
- Production company: WindChill Films
- Distributed by: Lionsgate
- Release date: 2006
- Country: United States
- Language: English

Séance is a 2006 American horror film written and directed by Mark L. Smith.

== Plot ==
Five college students left alone at Thanksgiving in their dormitory, an old converted Manhattan building, decide to hold a séance. This eventually leads to spooky things happening around them.

== Production ==
Séance was Mark L. Smith’s directorial debut, produced by WindChill Films. Describing the influences for the film, director and screenwriter Smith was approached by his daughter who would say that her room was haunted and that she saw a little girl who was behind her and then turn the corner and find that she was not there. Séance had its casting dates between April 20 and May 3, 2006.

The film had a short 14-day shooting schedule and was shot at Cheyenne Studios, just north of Los Angeles. Smith recalled they managed to shoot about 9 pages of script each day. It was set to be shot between late May and early June 2006.

== Release ==
The film was shown at the Eureka Springs Digital Film Festival where it won the award for Best Dramatic Feature and was nominated for Official Selection best Screenplay and Best Visual Effects and the Indy Horror Film Festival as well as being in the Official Selection for HorrorFest UK. The film was released on April 22, 2008, by Lionsgate on DVD.
