= Hal Lieberman =

American film producer

Hal Lieberman is an American producer and former president of production for Universal Pictures.

Born and raised in Bronx, New York, Lieberman has a B.A. from SUNY at Stony Brook and an M.A. from the University of Chicago.

Lieberman began his career as Warren Beatty's production assistant on Heaven Can Wait, and spent the next eight years as a screenwriter. Tony Ganz and Deborah Blum hired him in 1986 to oversee development for their Disney-based Blum/Ganz Productions; in 1987 he began his journey as a film executive at Universal Pictures, where he worked his way up the ranks to president in 1994.

As president of production at Universal, some of the movies Lieberman oversaw through development and production were Apollo 13, The Nutty Professor, Liar Liar, Fried Green Tomatoes, The River Wild, Death Becomes Her, Billy Madison, Happy Gilmore, Reality Bites, and Problem Child, amongst others.

As a producer, Lieberman's most recent film is House at the End of the Street, to be released in 2012 by Relativity Media and starring Jennifer Lawrence. Lieberman's other films include the critically acclaimed hit movie Bridge to Terabithia for Walt Disney Pictures, Vacancy for Sony Screen Gems and Vacancy 2: The First Cut for Sony's Stage 6, Terminator 3: Rise of the Machines, starring Arnold Schwarzenegger and Claire Danes, for Warner Brothers and Sony Pictures; Around the World in 80 Days, starring Jackie Chan, Steve Coogan and Arnold Schwarzenegger; and served as executive producer on Universal Pictures' U-571 (starring Matthew McConaughey) and The Jackal (starring Bruce Willis and Richard Gere). In 2004, Lieberman signed a deal with Columbia.

Lieberman currently has multiple projects in progress, including Forever 21 for DreamWorks starring Elizabeth Banks, The Secret Lives of Road Crews (to be directed by Chris Columbus) for Paramount, The Umbra (to be directed by Joe Carnahan) for Endgame Entertainment, and The Applicant (to be directed by George Ratliff) for ATO Pictures.

== Filmography ==
He was a producer in all films unless otherwise noted.

=== Film ===
Year	Film	Credit	Notes
1997	The Jackal	Executive producer	
1999	New Jersey Turnpikes		
2000	U-571	Executive producer	
2003	Terminator 3: Rise of the Machines		
2004	Around the World in 80 Days		
2007	Bridge to Terabithia		
2007	Vacancy		
2008	Vacancy 2: The First Cut		Direct-to-video
2012	House at the End of the Street		
2019	Undercover Brother 2		Direct-to-video
TBA	Forever 21		
TBA	The Applicant		
TBA	The Patriarch		
TBA	The Secret Lives of Road Crews		
TBA	The Umbra		

As an actor

Year	Film	Role
2000	Ivans Xtc	Lloyd Hall
