= Sophia Tatum =

American actress

- Born: September 20, 1999 (age 26); Los Angeles, California
- Occupation: Actress
- Years active: 2006–present

Sophia Tatum is an American actress. She is best known for playing Sil in the superhero film Samaritan.

== Early life ==
Tatum was born in Los Angeles. She is the daughter of actor and director Bradford Tatum and actress Stacy Haiduk.

== Career ==
Tatums first film role was in the film Salt which was directed by her father and also featured him along with her mother. Her first recurring role came playing Jenny Tuffield in the comedy series I Am Not Okay With This. Her next recurring role came playing Agent Drake in the mystery TV series Riverdale

== Personal life ==
Outside of acting, she is popular on social media. In July 2017 she was named the Instagram woman of the week.

== Filmography ==
=== Film ===
Year	Title	Role	Notes
2006	Salt	Chloe	
2020	3 Days Closer	Joanna	Short
2021	F9	F1 Driver	
2021	A Changed Man	The Dame	Short
2022	Samaritan	Sil	

=== Television ===
Year	Title	Role	Notes
2020	I Am Not Okay With This	Jenny Tuffield	3 episodes
2022	Riverdale	Agent Drake	5 episodes
