= Bradford Tatum =

American actor and author (born 1965)

- Born: Bradford Steven Tatum; March 29, 1965 (age 61); California, U.S.
- Occupations: Actor, Author
- Years active: 1989–present
- Spouse: Stacy Haiduk (m. 1997)
- Children: 1

Bradford Steven Tatum (born March 29, 1965) is an American actor and author, known for his role as Michael Hubbs in the cult favorite stoner film The Stoned Age (1994). He also played the bully, John Box in Powder (1995). In 1999, Bradford wrote, directed, and starred in the indie film Standing on Fishes. Bradford is married to actress Stacy Haiduk, with whom he guest-starred in the seaQuest DSV episode "Nothing but the Truth". In 2006, Tatum released the indie film Salt: A Fatal Attraction, which he wrote, produced and starred in. This film also featured his wife, Stacy Haiduk, and his daughter, Sophia Tatum. In 2016, he joined the cast of the HBO series Westworld.

== Filmography ==
- Westworld (2 episodes, 2016)
- Criminal Minds (1 episode; "Solitary Man", 2010)
- Salt: A Fatal Attraction (2006)
- The Lone Ranger (2003)
- Fastlane (1 episode, 2003)
- Melrose Place (1999)
- Standing on Fishes (1999)
- Charmed (1999)
- The Burning Zone (1997)
- Down Periscope (1996)
- NYPD Blue (1996)
- Black Scorpion (1995)
- Powder (1995)
- Excessive Force II: Force on Force (1995)
- Cool and the Crazy (1994)
- Force on Force (1994)
- The Stoned Age (1994)
- Hunter (2 episodes, 1990)
