= MVP: Most Valuable Primate =

2000 family film

- Theatrical release poster
- Directed by: Robert Vince
- Written by: Anne Vince; Robert Vince
- Produced by: Ian Fodie; Michael Strange; Robert Vince; Anne Vince
- Starring: Kevin Zegers; Jamie Renée Smith; Oliver Muirhead; Lomax Study; Dave Thomas; Patrick Cranshaw; Russell Ferrier; Rick Ducommun
- Cinematography: Glen Winter
- Edited by: Kelly Herron
- Music by: Brian 'Hoot' Gibson; Brahm Wenger
- Production company: Keystone Family Pictures (Note: As MVP Funky Monkey Productions Inc.)
- Distributed by: Keystone Releasing
- Release date: October 20, 2000
- Running time: 93 minutes
- Countries: Canada; United States
- Language: English
- Box office: $1.2 million

MVP: Most Valuable Primate is a 2000 comedy film that sparked the MVP trilogy. The film is about a chimpanzee, Jack, who plays hockey.

MVP: Most Valuable Primate was released by Keystone Releasing on October 20, 2000. The film received mixed reviews from critics and grossed $1.2 million.

== Plot ==
Jack, a three-year-old chimpanzee, is the subject of an experiment involving sign language performed by Dr. Kendall at San Pueblo University in San Diego, California. One day however, Dr. Kendall loses funding for his research. Kendall arranges for Jack to return to his original home in a California nature preserve, but dies from a heart attack before the transaction is completed. Kendall's boss, Dr. Peabody, sells Jack to the University of Tennessee. Meanwhile, the Westover family has just moved to Nelson, British Columbia. Steven, the son, was the leading scorer on his high school hockey team in California and joins the local junior B team, the Nuggets; he is surprised, however, by the violence of the play and the apathy of his teammates to their constant losing. His sister, Tara, who is deaf, is having a hard time making friends at her new school.

Meanwhile, hearing rumors that the University of Tennessee is performing hepatitis tests on primates, Darren, a maintenance worker at San Pueblo, arranges for Jack to return to the nature preserve as originally planned, but Jack falls asleep on the train and ends up in Nelson instead. Jack finds shelter in Tara's tree house but ends up surprising Tara when she enters, causing her to faint; when Tara wakes up she learns he can use sign language. She attempts to hide Jack from her parents and Steven but is unsuccessful. Steven soon discovers that Jack has an uncanny ability to play ice hockey and Jack joins Steven on the Nuggets after the coach convinces the league's owners that a chimpanzee player would bring in a massive increase in ticket sales. Jack instantly brings the Nuggets on-ice success and also helps Tara to become closer to her classmates.

Eventually, the Nuggets become the champions of junior B, qualifying for the Harvest Cup final in Vancouver against the Calgary Polar Bears. During the game, Peabody appears at the arena, hoping to take Jack from the team; the team refuses to give him up, so Peabody makes a plan to take him after the game. Tara is able to figure out Peabody's plan, and alerts Steven and the team; Steven takes Jack away from the arena during the second intermission in order to send him home to the nature preserve, and Tara, being a similar size to Jack, puts on Jack's gear and jersey, ends up scoring the game-winning goal and stops Peabody from taking Jack, who makes his way to the preserve, where he reunites with Darren and his parents.

== Cast ==
- Kevin Zegers as Steven Westover
- Jamie Renée Smith as Tara Westover
- Oliver Muirhead as Dr. Peabody
- Lomax Study as Dr. Kendall
- Dave Thomas as Willy Drucker
- Rick Ducommun as Coach Marlow
- Patrick Cranshaw as Super Fan
- Russell Ferrier as Darren
- Bernie, Mack, and Louie as Jack
- Ingrid Tesch as Susie Westover
- Philip Granger as Mark Westover
- Alexa Fox as Jane
- Jane Sowerby as Julie Beston

== Development ==
The film was originally produced by Keystone with Walt Disney Pictures, but Disney left the project after deeming the film as "strictly for the vid shelf".

== Release ==
The film was released theatrically in the United States and Canada on October 20, 2000 by Keystone Releasing. It was released on VHS and DVD in the United States and Canada on January 23, 2001, by Warner Home Video. Some international rights were sold to Universal Studios Home Video and Buena Vista Home Entertainment.

== Reception ==
The film received mixed reviews. On Rotten Tomatoes the film has an approval rating of 40% based on reviews from five critics.

== Sequels ==
The film generated one theater-released sequel and one direct-to-video sequel. In each film, Jack learns to play a different sport. These are MVP 2: Most Vertical Primate (2001) and MXP: Most Xtreme Primate (2003). While MVP 2 gained a theatrical release as with its predecessor, MXP was released straight-to-video.

== See also ==
- List of films about ice hockey
