= Vicious Circle (2008 film) =

- Directed by: Paul Boyd
- Written by: Paul Boyd; Howard Gibson
- Produced by: Angelyna Martinez
- Starring: Paul Rodriguez Jr. Emily Rios; Trevor Wright
- Cinematography: Denis Maloney
- Edited by: Shane McLafferty
- Release date: July 25, 2008 (New York International Latino Film Festival)
- Running time: 90 minutes
- Country: United States
- Language: English

Vicious Circle is a 2008 drama film written and directed by Paul Boyd and starring Paul Rodriguez Jr., Emily Rios, and Trevor Wright.

== Plot ==
Set on the streets of modern-day Venice Beach, Vicious Circle is a tragic punk rock Latino love story; a raw, edgy, teenage Romeo and Juliet with a murder mystery twist. We first see 18-year-old RJ (skateboard star, Paul Rodriguez Jr.) running through the streets of LA with a blood stained shirt and a gun in his backpack, leaving us to wonder, "What happened?" An artist and skater with a heart of gold, R.J. dreams of moving to New York City to pursue his dream of creating comic books. His hand-made sketchbook demonstrates his unique talent and acts as a portal between fantasy and reality. A strong influence of the game of chess from RJ's incarcerated father permeates his art and life; RJ lives by the rules of the game and knows the repercussions of one bad move. Soon, RJ meets Angel (Emily Rios), a rebellious singer in a local teenage punk band. Their unexpected story of true love causes the tides to turn in both lives, and RJ reveals a secret that could cost the life of his new love.

== Cast ==
- Paul Rodriguez Jr. as R.J.
- Emily Rios as Angel
- Trevor Wright as Fin
- Robert Zepeda as Smiler Sanchez
- Richard Edson as John
- Idalis DeLeón as Helena
- Perrey Reeves as Sgt. Berger
- Cody McMains as Alfred
- Clifton Powell as Freddy
- Paul Rodriguez Sr. as Professor
- Angelyna Martinez as CeCe Sanchez
- Drew Osborne as Young Fin
- Mike Diaz as Sgt. Gomez
- Steve Akahoshi as Mr. Chen
- Magdaleno "Guic One" Robles Jr as friend of Smiler

== Soundtrack ==
Title	Artist
Opening Title	Asdru Sierra
"The Chase"	Asdru Sierra
"The Wake"	Asdru Sierra
"Nighthawks"	Wake Up Incinerate
"Restless Evil"	Cowboy Robot
"Dog Eat Dog"	TriggerFinger
"Little Tokyo"	Wake Up Incinerate
"Mad House"	Guic One DRP
"Savior"	Monster In The Machine
"Gravel Sheets"	Wake Up Incinerate
"Fight"	The Dirges

== Release ==
Vicious Circle made its premiere at the 9th Annual New York International Latino Film Festival on July 25, 2008, at the Director's Guild Theatre. The film won Best Picture at 2008 HBO New York International Latino Film Festival. Vicious Circle also won the Audience Award at the 2008 Orlando International Film Festival and was an Official Selection at the 2009 Downtown Film Festival in Los Angeles.

Vicious Circle signed a distribution deal with Maya Entertainment in 2009.

== Awards ==
Year	Award	Result	Category	Recipient
2008	New York International Latino Film Festival	Won	Best Film	Paul Boyd
