= Julius Avery =

Australian film director

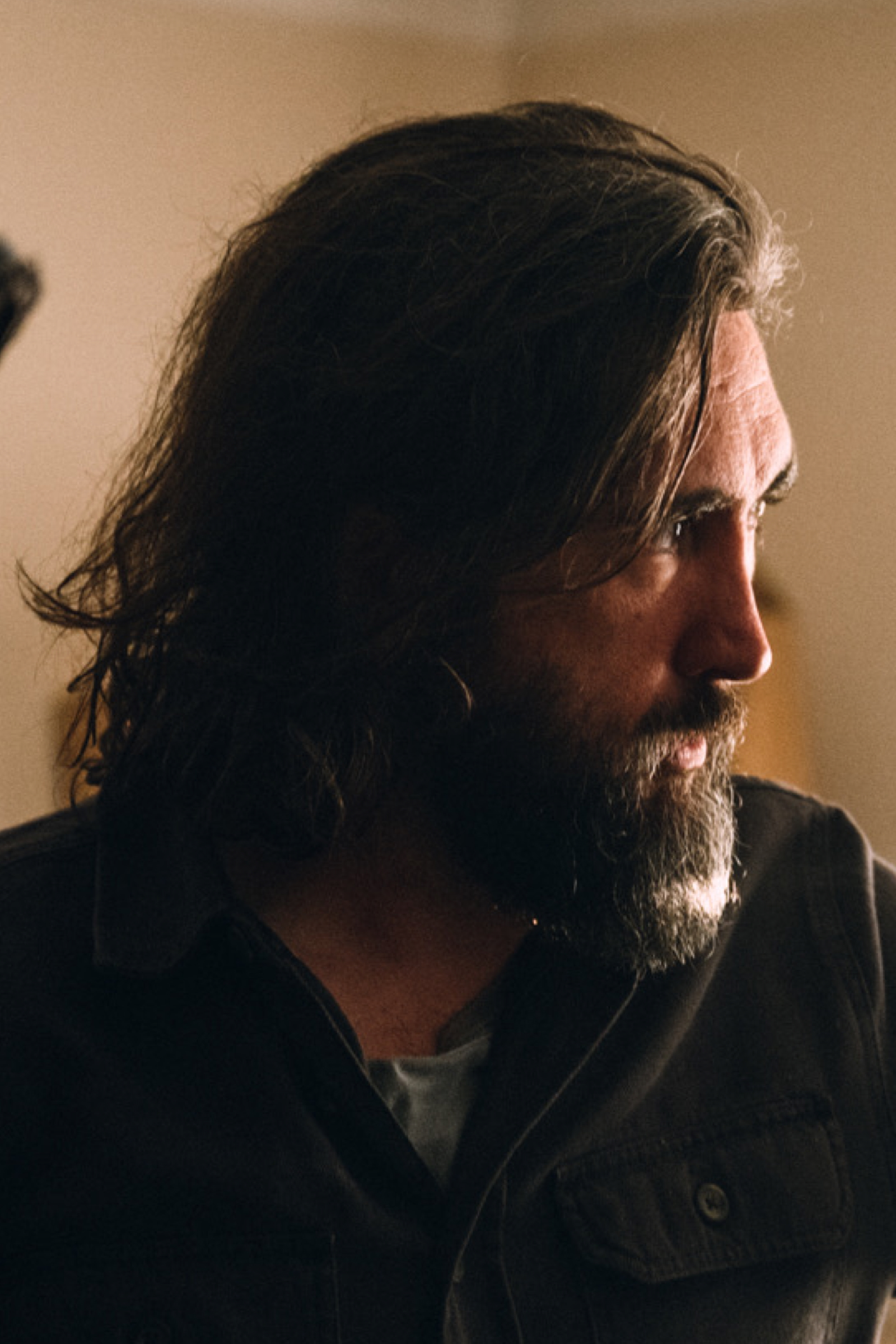
- Avery in 2025
- Born: 1979 (age 46–47); Pemberton, Western Australia
- Occupation: Film director · producer · screenwriter
- Years active: 2000–present

Julius Avery is an Australian filmmaker. His credits include Son of a Gun (2014), Overlord (2018) and The Pope's Exorcist (2023).

== Life and works ==
After growing up in Pemberton, Western Australia, Avery attended The Victorian College of the Arts in Melbourne. He has written and directed several award winning short films including Cannes jury prize winning short film Jerrycan in 2008. Avery wrote and produced Yardbird in 2012, an award winning short film nominated for several major awards including the Palme d’Or at Cannes. Both were produced through Avery’s production company Bridle Path Films.

In 2014, Avery wrote and directed his first feature, Australian crime thriller film Son of a Gun starring Brenton Thwaites, Ewan McGregor, Alicia Vikander, and Jacek Koman. The film was nominated for Best Film at The London Film Festival, BFI awards. Son of a Gun was produced in association with Avery’s company Bridle Path Films.

Avery directed the war horror film Overlord (2018) for Bad Robot Productions and Paramount Pictures. Overlord stars Jovan Adepo, Wyatt Russell, Pilou Asbæk, Iain De Caestecker, John Magaro and Mathilde Ollivier. The film was produced by J. J. Abrams and Lindsey Weber and written by Billy Ray and Mark L. Smith.

Along with being announced as the director of The Heavy, a Paramount and Bad Robot production, Avery had been recruited by 20th Century Fox to write and direct a remake of Flash Gordon alongside Matthew Vaughn who was to be producing. However, following Disney's acquisition of 21st Century Fox's assets, the film was cancelled. He instead directed MGM's Samaritan, a dark superhero film starring Sylvester Stallone, released in August 26, 2022 it went onto to be the number one watched movies on Prime Video that year.

Avery's latest film The Pope's Exorcist (2023) is a supernatural horror film, from a screenplay by Michael Petroni and Evan Spiliotopoulos, based on the 1990 book An Exorcist Tells His Story and the 1992 book An Exorcist: More Stories by Father Gabriele Amorth. The film stars Russell Crowe as Amorth and was released in the United States on April 14, 2023, by Sony Pictures Releasing. The film grossed $20 million in the United States and Canada, and $57 million in other territories, for a worldwide total of $77 million. The film later that year was streamed on Netflix starting August 16, 2023, where it ranked as the number one film in America for nine straight days.

== Filmography ==
Short film

- Matchbox (2002)
- Little Man (2004)
- Solvent (2004)
- End of Town (2006)
- The Tank (2007)
- Jerrycan (2008)
- Yardbird (2012) (Producer/writer)

Feature film

- Son of a Gun (2014) (Also writer)
- Overlord (2018)
- Samaritan (2022)
- The Pope's Exorcist (2023)
