= Overlord (2018 film) =

Film directed by Julius Avery

- Theatrical release poster
- Directed by: Julius Avery
- Screenplay by: Billy Ray; Mark L. Smith
- Story by: Billy Ray
- Produced by: J. J. Abrams; Lindsey Weber
- Starring: Jovan Adepo; Wyatt Russell; Pilou Asbæk; John Magaro; Bokeem Woodbine
- Cinematography: Laurie Rose; Fabian Wagner
- Edited by: Matt Evans
- Music by: Jed Kurzel
- Production companies: Paramount Pictures; Bad Robot
- Distributed by: Paramount Pictures
- Release dates: September 22, 2018 (Fantastic Fest); November 9, 2018 (United States)
- Running time: 110 minutes
- Country: United States
- Language: English
- Budget: $38 million
- Box office: $41.7 million

Overlord is a 2018 American alternate history action horror film directed by Julius Avery and written by Billy Ray and Mark L. Smith. It stars Jovan Adepo, Wyatt Russell, Pilou Asbæk, John Magaro and Bokeem Woodbine. The film was produced by Lindsey Weber and J. J. Abrams, through his Bad Robot banner, as the company's first R-rated film. The plot follows several American soldiers who are dropped behind enemy lines the day before D-Day and discover terrifying Nazi experiments.

Overlord was released in the United States on November 9, 2018, by Paramount Pictures. The film received generally positive reviews and grossed $41.7 million against a budget of $38 million.

== Plot ==
On the eve of D-Day in an alternate 1940s where Executive Order 9981 is signed in 1944, a paratrooper squad, most of them in an integrated unit, is sent to destroy a German radio-jamming tower in an old church. Their plane is shot down and most of the squad, including squad leader Sergeant Rensin, die either in the crash or by Nazi soldiers and landmines. Four survivors remain: second-in-command Corporal Ford, Private Boyce, Private Tibbet, and Private Chase.

The survivors meet Chloe, a young woman from the church's village, and take refuge in her house. Chloe lives with her 8-year-old brother Paul and her aunt, who was disfigured by Nazi experiments. Tibbet and Chase depart for the scheduled rendezvous site and a Nazi patrol led by SS Hauptsturmführer Wafner visits Chloe. Wafner sends his men away and proceeds to coerce Chloe for sex, threatening to send her brother to be "fixed." Boyce and Ford interrupt and capture Wafner.

Boyce searches for Tibbet and Chase, witnessing Nazis burning disfigured villagers, and is forced by a dog into a truck carrying dead bodies to the church. Boyce disembarks and finds an underground base housing a radio operating room, and laboratory where the Germans perform experiments involving ancient black tar distilled into a serum using living prisoners. Boyce takes a syringe of the serum and rescues Rosenfeld, another member of their squad who had been captured. They escape through the base's sewers.

Boyce, Rosenfeld, Tibbet and Chase all return to Chloe's house where Wafner refuses to explain the serum. Wafner kills Chase as he attempts to escape. Boyce injects Chase with the serum, resurrecting him as a violent mutant, and Boyce bludgeons him to death. A patrol responds and Ford blows off half of Wafner's face in the ensuing firefight. Wafner escapes with Paul as a hostage and injects himself with two doses of the serum in the lab.

The squad plans to infiltrate the base, destroy the tower and laboratory, and rescue Paul. Rosenfeld and Tibbet launch a frontal assault as a distraction, while the others enter the base through the sewer. Boyce and Ford plant the explosives, and Chloe finds Paul, sends him back to the village, and kills a mutated test subject who corners her. She returns to the village as Tibbet and Rosenfeld are pursued by the base's defenders. Tibbet is wounded while shielding Paul from gunfire. Chloe kills the remaining Germans and treats Tibbet's wounds.

Wafner, mutated and superhumanly strong, impales Ford on a meat hook and tells him about the tar. They'd been searching for godly, supernatural power and by accident did they find it beneath the old church. When Boyce distracts Wafner, Ford frees himself, uses the serum, and holds off Wafner. Boyce explodes an oxygen tank, sending Wafner into a pit. Ford, mutating, orders Boyce to leave him behind and detonate the explosives, believing neither side should possess the serum. Boyce escapes as the church and jamming tower collapse behind him, killing Ford, Wafner, and the test subjects. He joins the others as a radio announces that the D-Day invasion was successful.

In his report, Boyce credits Ford for planting the bombs inside the church. Boyce tells his commanding officer there was no underground lab and the survivors are reassigned to another company.

== Cast ==
- Jovan Adepo as Private First Class Edward Boyce, an idealistic paratrooper in the 101st Airborne Division
- Wyatt Russell as Corporal Lewis Ford, an explosive expert reassigned to the 101st Airborne Division to assist with their vital mission to blow up a radio jamming tower.
- Pilou Asbæk as SS Hauptsturmführer Wafner, a high-level Nazi enforcer
- Mathilde Ollivier as Chloe Laurent, Paul's sister and a French civilian who aids the stranded paratroopers.
- John Magaro as Private First Class Lyle Tibbet, a paratrooper and sniper.
- Bokeem Woodbine as Sergeant Rensin, a paratrooper in charge of the 101st Airborne Division
- Iain De Caestecker as Private Morton Chase, a military photographer and paratrooper
- Dominic Applewhite as Private First Class Jacob Rosenfeld, a Jewish paratrooper
- Gianny Taufer as Paul Laurent, Chloe's younger brother
- Jacob Anderson as Private First Class Charlie Dawson, a paratrooper with dreams of writing a book
- Erich Redman as Dr. Schmidt, head of the experimentation on French civilians and dead German soldiers.
- Patrick Brammall as American Officer
- Mark McKenna as Private First Class Murphy, a paratrooper
- Joseph Quinn as Grunauer, a paratrooper and German translator
- Meg Foster as Chloe's Aunt

== Production ==
Initially conceived a decade earlier, it was announced in February 2017 that Julius Avery would direct Overlord, from a screenplay co-written by Billy Ray and Mark L. Smith; J. J. Abrams would produce and Paramount Pictures would distribute. In March 2017, Jovan Adepo and Wyatt Russell joined the cast. In May 2017, Mathilde Ollivier, John Magaro, Gianny Taufer, Pilou Asbæk, and Bokeem Woodbine joined the cast.

=== Filming ===
Principal photography began in September 2017 and wrapped in January 2018. Visual effects for the film were provided by Industrial Light & Magic, Image Engine, Rodeo FX, Pixomondo, Mr. X, Southbay and Nzviage. Mark Bakowski, Julian Foddy, Dan Seddon, Stefano Trivelli and Pauline Duvall served as visual effects supervisors.

== Music ==
The official motion picture soundtrack was released on digital only on November 9, 2018, by Paramount Music Corporation. The soundtrack was composed by Australian singer-songwriter and film composer Jed Kurzel, known for his previous work on the sci-fi film Alien: Covenant. This film is Kurzel's second collaboration with director Julius Avery, having previously worked together on Son of a Gun. Playing over the film's credits is the song "Bridging the Gap" by the rapper Nas, though this does not appear on the soundtrack.

== Release ==
Overlord was originally scheduled to be released on October 26, 2018. However, in July 2018, it was pushed back to November 9, 2018.

Footage premiered at CinemaCon in April 2018, and the first trailer was released on July 18, 2018. The film premiered at Fantastic Fest 2018 on September 22.

=== Home video ===
The film was released on DVD and Blu-ray on February 19, 2019, and was available on Digital HD from Amazon Video and iTunes on February 18, 2019.

== Reception ==
=== Box office ===
Overlord grossed $21.7 million in the United States and Canada, and $20 million in other territories, for a total worldwide gross of $41.7 million, against a production budget of $38 million.

In the United States and Canada, Overlord was released alongside The Girl in the Spider's Web and The Grinch, and was projected to gross $8–13 million from 2,859 theaters in its opening weekend. It made $3 million on its first day, including $900,000 from Thursday night previews. It went on to debut to $10.1 million, finishing third at the box office. The film fell 62% in its second weekend to $3.9 million, finishing eighth.

=== Critical response ===
On review aggregator Rotten Tomatoes, the film holds an approval rating of 82% based on 225 reviews. The website's critical consensus reads, "Part revisionist war drama, part zombie thriller, and part all-out genre gorefest, Overlord offers A-level fun for B-movie fans of multiple persuasions." On Metacritic, the film has a weighted average score of 60 out of 100 based on 28 critics, indicating "mixed or average" reviews. Audiences polled by CinemaScore gave the film an average grade of "B" on an A+ to F scale, while PostTrak reported film-goers gave it three out of five stars.

Amy Nicholson of Variety wrote "Even at its most suspenseful, when Jed Kurzel's cello score stabs at the eardrums, Overlord feels familiar, a collage of cinematic nightmares checking off its influences: a woman wielding a flamethrower like Ripley in Aliens, a cruel SS officer (the terrifically hissable Pilou Asbæk) who grins like a Batman villain, and enough of a Castle Wolfenstein video-game vibe that its fans may find themselves reaching for the controls out of habit." John DeFoe of The Hollywood Reporter gave the film a positive review, writing: "As the team moves in on the laboratory and the radio tower above it, Avery balances the truly disgusting with more comic-book-like action...Still, the movie's tone holds together, with the lurid colors of opening scenes (the cinematic equivalent of a gory, pre-code war comic book) setting the stage for heightened action to come."

While most reviews were positive, Michael Ordoña of the San Francisco Chronicle gave a rather scathing review, writing that the "enjoyment" one expects from GIs fighting zombies is "stunted by the film's lack of energy and imagination," and goes on to explain, "Director Julius Avery goes to the startle-scare early and often. Every turn, every beat feels too familiar. The writers didn't bother researching period lingo. Characters do idiotic things to enable plot devices. The screaming and gunfire seem excessive for a stealth mission. And the whole undead thing simply doesn't pay off." Although he does admit, "At least the makeup effects are quite good."

Corey Plante of Inverse addressed the film's reluctance to “lean into stereotypes or depict racism for the sake of historical accuracy” with an interview with star Jovan Adepo. “We’re not trying to make a historical movie,” Adepo said, “casting was less about race and more about who has those characteristics that help put together the strongest cast possible.”

Rotten Tomatoes lists the film on its 100 Best Zombie Movies, Ranked by Tomatometer.

=== Accolades ===
Award	Category	Recipient(s)	Result
Academy of Science Fiction, Fantasy & Horror Films, USA	Best Horror Film	Overlord	Nominated
Academy of Science Fiction, Fantasy & Horror Films, USA	Best Make-Up	Tristan Versluis, Naomi Donne, Duncan Jarman	Nominated
Fangoria Chainsaw Awards	Best Wide-Release Film	Julius Avery	Nominated
Hawaii Film Critics Society	Best Makeup	Tristan Versluis, Naomi Donne, Duncan Jarman	Nominated
Hawaii Film Critics Society	Best Sci-Fi/Horror Film	Overlord	Nominated
Toronto After Dark Film Festival	Best Cinematography	Laurie Rose Fabian Wagner	Won
Toronto After Dark Film Festival	Best Sound Design	Robert Stambler	Won
