= Arjay Smith =

American actor (born 1983)

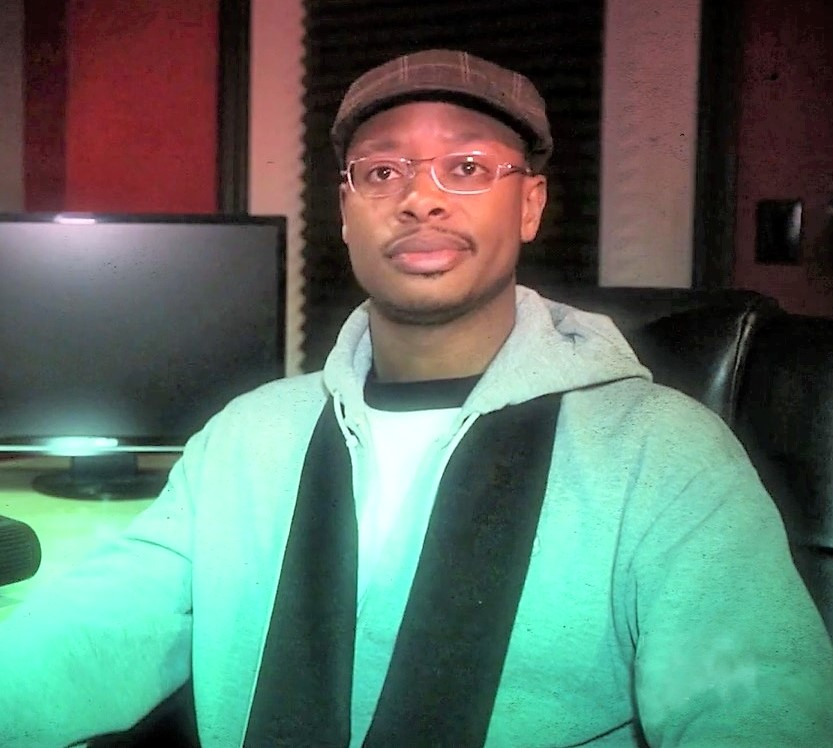
- Smith in 2012
- Born: November 27, 1983 (age 42); Redlands, California, U.S.
- Occupation: Actor
- Years active: 1993–present
- Spouse: Brittany Scott Smith (m. 2015)
- Children: 2

Arjay L. M. Smith (born November 27, 1983) is an American actor best known for his teenage role portraying the title character of the Nickelodeon children's television series The Journey of Allen Strange. Smith portrayed terrorist Laurent Dubaku during Season 7 of the FOX thriller/drama 24. Smith also portrayed Max Lewicki on the TNT television series Perception.

== Career ==
Smith's first acting role was in the sitcom Nick Freno: Licensed Teacher, playing Jared. He portrayed Brian Parks in the film The Day After Tomorrow alongside Jake Gyllenhaal and as Tanner in Vacancy 2: The First Cut. He was in the film To Save a Life as Matt McQueen. He has also appeared in television shows such as Sons of Anarchy, NYPD Blue, Criminal Minds, Bones, Like Family, Strong Medicine, Cold Case, Without a Trace, Charmed, Masters of Horror, Step by Step, That's So Raven, Boston Public, The West Wing, The Drew Carey Show, ER, Figure It Out, Medium, The Bernie Mac Show and ‘’The Journey of Allen Strange’’. Smith had recurring roles in Malcolm in the Middle as Cadet Ken Finley, and The Rookie as James Murray.

== Filmography ==
=== Film ===
Year	Title	Role	Notes
1997	Toothless	Phil	
2004	The Day After Tomorrow	Brian Parks	
2008	First Sunday	Preston	
2008	Be Kind Rewind	Manny	
2008	Vacancy 2: The First Cut	Tanner	
2008	Finding Chance	Jayden	
2009	To Save a Life	Matt McQueen	
2012	We Made This Movie	Eric 'LeBron' James	

=== Television ===
Year	Title	Role	Notes
1995	Step by Step	Nelson	Episode: "Three Girls and a Baby""
1996–1997	Nick Freno: Licensed Teacher	Jared	
1997	ER	Brian	Episode: "When the Bough Breaks"
1997–2000	The Journey of Allen Strange	Allen Strange	Main Role
2000	The Drew Carey Show	Richard	Episode: "Drew Can't Carey a Tune"
2000–2001	Malcolm in the Middle	Ken Finley	9 episodes
2001	Strong Medicine	Kyle	Episode: "Bloodwork"
2001–2004	NYPD Blue	Anthony Woodside/Mickey Economides/Tyler Newell	3 episodes
2002–2004	The Bernie Mac Show	Reggie	Episodes: "Stop Having Sex", "Love Bug"
2003	That's so Raven	Gabriel	Episode: "Ye Olde Dating Game"
2003	Like Family	Brad	Episode: Pilot
2003	Boston Public	Taylor Graham	Episode: "Chapter Seventy-one"
2004	Cold Case	Derek Jackson	Episode: "The Badlands"
2005	Charmed	Speed	Episode: "Battle of the Hexes"
2006	Without a Trace	Darnell Williams	Episode: "White Balance"
2007	My Name Is Earl	Clint	Episode: "G.E.D."
2008	Medium	Evan Sabow (young)	Episode: "Aftertaste"
2009	24	Laurent Dubaku	2 episodes
2009	Saving Grace	Terrance Metarie	Episode: "But There's Clay"
2009	Raising the Bar	James "Prez" Madison	Episode: "Rules of Engagement"
2009	Bones	Tony Salinas	Episode: "The Plain in the Prodigy"
2009	FlashForward	Louis	Episode: "Black Swan"
2009	CSI: Miami	Greg Ballard	Episode: "Point of Impact"
2009	Three Rivers	Jared	Episode: "A Roll of Dice"
2010	NCIS	Roy	Episode: "Masquerade"
2010	Ghost Whisperer	Scott	Episode: "Blood Money"
2010	Detroit 1-8-7	JB	Episode: "Broken Engagement/Trashman"
2012	The Finder	Trey	Episode: "A Life After Death"
2012	Criminal Minds	Tony Anders	Episode: "God Complex"
2012–2015	Perception	Max Lewicki	Main Role
2013	Men at Work	Donald	Episode: Uncle Gibbs
2014	Sons of Anarchy	Grant McQueen	5 episodes
2016	Major Crimes	Dennis Price	5 episodes
2016	Designated Survivor	Nelson	Episode: "Pilot"
2017	NCIS: New Orleans	Carlton Boone	Episode: "Knockout"
2017	MacGyver	Detective Turner	Episode: "Bullet + Pen"
2018	The Good Doctor	Daniel Porter	Episode: "36 Hour"
2021	Sacrifice	Bobby Howard	6 episodes
2021–present	The Rookie	James Murray	Recurring Role
2026	Malcolm in the Middle: Life's Still Unfair	Ken Finley	1 episode
