= Terror Trap =

- DVD cover
- Directed by: Dan Garcia
- Written by: Dan Garcia
- Produced by: Matt Keith; Karlas Powell; Michael Thompson
- Starring: David James Elliott; Michael Madsen; Jeff Fahey; Heather Marie Marsden
- Cinematography: John Lands
- Edited by: Ryan Dufrene; Noah Berlow
- Music by: Ryan Dufrene; Andrew Markus
- Production company: American World Pictures
- Distributed by: Dan Garcia Productions; DMG Holdings; Most Wanted Films
- Release date: October 10, 2010
- Running time: 86 minutes
- Country: United States
- Language: English
- Budget: $2 million

Terror Trap is a 2010 American horror film. It was written and directed by Dan Garcia. Filming took place in Louisiana. The film stars David James Elliott, Michael Madsen and Jeff Fahey. It was released in some countries as Vacancy 3 and has been described as a ripoff of the 2007 film Vacancy, which also features a couple being terrorized by a motel owner and his employees while being recorded, although they are unconnected.

== Plot ==
When a married couple, Don and his wife, Nancy, who face relationship problems and constantly argue, go on a "vacation" to a casino, a car accident takes place. Looking for help, they call the town's sheriff, who suggests they go to a certain motel and he will have the car towed the next day. At the motel, they find blood in their apartment, and a girl being savagely killed next door. The two must fight for their lives against the motel's workers and men dressed in unusual masks, but can they survive a night alone against dangerous men all by themselves with no real weapons or any other means of support?

The film ends with Don killing everyone and barely rescuing Nancy from the "sheriff", who is later killed by the actual owner of the motel, who was behind it all. The man survives, and walks off, while Nancy and Don escaped earlier. At a funeral for Sydney, the girl who was killed earlier in the film, while a worker for the man assures Sydney's mom that if she needs somewhere to stay, he owns a motel not too far away. The man overhears and questions the other man, but walks away. However, pressing a button, the other man's car explodes. A last image of Don and Nancy walking off together in a field of weeds near the street.

== Cast ==
- David James Elliott as Don, an ex-marine who has a website for clothes and materials. He is married to Nancy.
- Heather Marie Marsden as Nancy, the wife of Don. At the beginning of the film, the two have relationship issues, with Nancy constantly telling Don to go "fuck" himself. However, they rekindle their relationship at the film's ending.
- Michael Madsen as Carter, the "owner" of the motel.
- Jeff Fahey as Sheriff Cleveland, who is part of the massacre. He is killed.
- Andrew Sensenig as Jonas Ruggins
- Lacey Minchew as Sydney
- Matt Triplett as Killer #1
- Mark De Alessandro as Killer #2
- Danny Cosmo as Killer #3
- Jack Radosta as Killer #4
- Chris J. Fanguy as Killer #5
- Mike Mayhall as Killer #6
- Bill Martin Williams as Preacher
- Wayne Douglas Morgan as Police Officer
- Jerry Lee Leighton as Truck Man
- Steve Petit as Fireman
- Judy Henderson as Sydney's Mother

== Release ==
Terror Trap was released direct to video on October 10, 2010. When the film was announced horror movie websites Bloody Disgusting and Dread Central criticized the film's plot. Brad Miska described it as a ripoff of Vacancy, and Foywonder of Dread Central stated that "so much of it appears to be brazenly mimicking Vacancy to the point you cannot believe The Asylum didn’t produce it."

== Reception ==
Dread Central gave Terror Trap a rating of 2 out of 5 blades, writing that "The best to be said for Terror Trap is that I didn’t mind it. Not exactly a ringing endorsement, I realize. Elliot’s constant embarrassment, the wife’s needlessly angry outbursts, and Fahey’s madman hamminess kept me occupied more so than the snuff filmmaking at this death trap motel." The film also received reviews from Flickering Myth and HorrorNews.net, the latter of which recommended the film for the performances of Michael Madsen and Jeff Fahey.
