= Ian Bagg =

Canadian comedian

- Born: Terrace, British Columbia
- Occupations: Stand-up comedian; actor; writer

Comedy career
- Years active: 1993–present
- Medium: Stand-up; film; television
- Website: ianbagg.com

Ian Bagg is a Canadian stand-up comedian, actor and writer. He is known for bantering with audience members. He was a finalist on the ninth season of Last Comic Standing in 2015. Bagg has been a regular on Jimmy Kimmel's Comedy Club show in Las Vegas until it closed temporarily due to the COVID-19 pandemic. He has also appeared on other shows.

== Early life ==
Bagg is a native of Terrace, British Columbia. He moved to New York City in 1996. Bagg previously lived in Washougal, Washington, where he often performed at the local Grand Theatre.

== Career ==
Bagg has performed on The Tonight Show, The Late Late Show and in films Cradle Will Rock, MXP 2 and MXP 3. He featured in specials on Comedy Central, HBO and Showtime.

Bagg was interviewed on WGN in 2017 and in 2019.

He appeared on Tom Segura and Christina Pazsitzky’s podcast Your Mom's House in September 2020 and June 2021.

In July 2021, Ian Bagg began co-hosting (with Matt Fondiler) the Sword and Scale Rewind Podcast, a comedy aftershow for the popular true-crime podcast Sword and Scale.

Since 2021, Bagg co-hosts a podcast with Jeff Sharples called Enjoying Orange Slices with Jeff & Ian.

== Personal life ==
Bagg lives in Long Beach, California.

== Filmography ==
=== Film ===
Year	Title	Role	Notes
1999	Cradle Will Rock	VTA - Disgruntled Worker #4	
2001	MVP 2: Most Vertical Primate	Olaf Shickedanz	
2002	Purpose	Caddy #1	
2003	MXP: Most Xtreme Primate	Gilfred	
2005	The Life Coach	Ian	
2005	Save the Mavericks	Artie	
2008	Legacy	Security #1	Direct-to-video
2018	A Tale of Two Sillies	Mad TV / Radio Advertisements	Voice

=== Television ===
Year	Title	Role	Notes
1993	Double, Double, Toil and Trouble	Fat Man	Television film
1998	Missing & Presumed Funny	Himself	Comedy special
1999	Dr. Katz, Professional Therapist	Himself	1 episode
2007	Comedy Central Presents	Himself	1 episode
2008	History of the Joke		
2010–2011	Two Worlds II: Sordahon's Journey	Sordahon	8 episodes
2013	Getting To F***ing Know You	Himself	Comedy special
2015	Last Comic Standing	Himself	4 episodes

== Discography ==
- 2012- It Takes A Village
- 2018- Conversations
- 2020- Everybody Wants Some
