= Vacancy 2: The First Cut =

2009 American slasher film

- DVD cover
- Directed by: Eric Bross
- Written by: Mark L. Smith
- Produced by: Hal Lieberman
- Starring: Agnes Bruckner; Trevor Wright; Arjay Smith; David Moscow
- Cinematography: Horacio Marquínez
- Edited by: Angela M. Catanzaro
- Music by: Jerome Dillon
- Production company: Stage 6 Films
- Distributed by: Sony Pictures Home Entertainment
- Release dates: October 24, 2008 (Dayton, Ohio premiere); January 20, 2009 (United States)
- Running time: 86 minutes
- Country: United States
- Language: English

Vacancy 2: The First Cut is a 2008 American direct-to-video slasher film directed by Eric Bross and starring Agnes Bruckner, Trevor Wright, Arjay Smith and David Moscow. It is the prequel to 2007's Vacancy, with Kate Beckinsale and Luke Wilson.

== Plot ==
A man, Smith, checks into the Meadow View Inn and brutally murders a woman he brought with him. The hotel staff, who had set up hidden cameras in the rooms to secretly record couples having sex, the recordings of which they would sell, witness the murder. They attack him and tie him up. Instead of calling the cops, the hotel manager, Gordon, agrees to Smith's proposition to hire him to torture and murder motel guests and then sell the videotapes as snuff films.

Days later while driving home, young couple Jessica (Agnes Bruckner) and Caleb (Trevor Wright), and Caleb's friend Tanner (Arjay Smith), check into the motel for a night's rest; Tanner takes the room adjoint to Jessica and Caleb's. Upon turning on the television, he witnesses live footage of the room next door and realizes they are all being watched. The three attempt to flee from the motel but are blocked by Smith and two other masked men. They capture Caleb and stab him in the stomach until he dies, while Jessica and Tanner hide in the woods.

Jessica and Tanner run to a nearby house and the couple living there let them in; they try to explain about the motel but the husband doesn't believe them. Moments later, Smith and the other men appear, telling the couple Jessica and Tanner stole from them then ran from the motel. The wife attempts to call the police to resolve the situation, but Smith shoots the husband then her, and Jessica and Tanner flee again. The men catch both of them and torture Tanner first. Smith then calls the others off, wanting to kill Jessica himself. It becomes apparent to Gordon that Smith has become a loose cannon, with no intention of following Gordon's lead. Gordon tells the other man that they will let Smith kill her, then call the police and blame the whole thing on him.

When left alone for a minute, Jessica manages to untie herself. When Smith returns, she stabs him in the face and escapes with a gun. Gordon searches the lake and sees a sweater sticking out of the water. As he investigates it, Jessica appears in the water behind him and pulls the trigger, killing him. Smith hears the gunshot and runs to the lake, while Jessica hides in a nearby trailer. Smith finds her and attempts to stab her, but she causes a fire and leaves Smith burning to death in the trailer.

The following morning when the police have arrived, they are skeptical of Jessica's story as the cameras and all of the bodies cannot be found. Meanwhile, at another motel (The Pinewood Motel from the first movie), a badly scarred Smith informs a trucker that he will have the motel up and running in a few weeks, just as soon as the cameras are set. Smith then gives the trucker a snuff film, and tells him that he will make more copies as soon as he can.

== Cast ==
- Agnes Bruckner as Jessica Pruit
- Trevor Wright as Caleb
- Arjay Smith as Tanner
- David Moscow as Gordon
- Brian Klugman as Reece
- Beau Billingslea as Otis, The Husband
- Nelson Lee as Groom
- Gwendoline Yeo as Bride
- Scott G. Anderson as Smith
- Angel Oquendo as Deputy #3

== Soundtrack ==
64 minutes of music was written, performed, recorded, mixed, and mastered by Jerome Dillon (Nearly, Nine Inch Nails) with engineer Ryan Kull, in his home studio for the soundtrack.

== Release ==
The film was released direct-to-DVD on January 28, 2009. Reviews were average and mediocre.
