= Danielle Steel's A Perfect Stranger =

- Written by: Danielle Steel; Jan Worthington
- Directed by: Michael Miller
- Starring: Robert Urich; Stacy Haiduk; Darren McGavin; Susan Sullivan; Holly Marie Combs; Marion Ross; Ron Gabriel; Tamara Gorski; George R. Robertson; Patricia Brown
- Music by: Lee Holdridge; Yuri Gorbachow; Jeffrey Kimball
- Country of origin: United States
- Original language: English

Production
- Producers: Douglas S. Cramer; Darren Frankel; Dennis Hammer
- Cinematography: Mike Fash
- Editor: Gordon McClellan
- Running time: 105 minutes
- Production company: The Cramer Company

Original release
- Release: September 12, 1994

Danielle Steel's A Perfect Stranger, also known as A Perfect Stranger, is a 1994 American romantic-drama television film directed by Michael Miller, based on the romance novel A Perfect Stranger by Danielle Steel. The most important element is the love triangle which characterizes it. The film is set in San Francisco, California, and was released in the United States in 1994 where it aired on NBC.

== Plot ==
A lawyer falls in love with a woman who's married to a dying millionaire which results in a love triangle.

== Cast ==
- Robert Urich – Alex Hale
- Stacy Haiduk – Raphaella Phillips
- Darren McGavin – John Henry Phillips
- Susan Sullivan – Kaye
- Holly Marie Combs – Amanda Hale
- Marion Ross – Charlotte Brandon
- Ron Gabriel – Fred
- Tamara Gorski – Sarah
- George R. Robertson – Richard Lance
- Patricia Brown – Mary
- Denise McLeod – Flight Attendant
- Margaret Ozols – German Housekeeper
- Adrian Truss – Publisher
- Natalie Gray – Flight Attendant (uncredited)
- Michal Page – Woman in airport (uncredited)
