= MVP 2: Most Vertical Primate =

2001 film by Robert Vince

- Thearical release poster
- Directed by: Robert Vince
- Written by: Anne Vince (screenplay, characters); Robert Vince (screenplay, characters); Elan Mastai (screenplay)
- Produced by: Anna McRoberts; Michael Strange; Robert Vince; Anne Vince; Theodore Henry Maston
- Starring: Richard Karn; Cameron Bancroft; Robert Costanzo; Oliver Muirhead; Troy Ruptash; Patrick Cranshaw; Scott Goodman; Bob Burnquist
- Cinematography: Glen Winter
- Edited by: Kelly Herron
- Music by: Brahm Wenger
- Production company: Keystone Family Pictures (Note: As 2nd Banana Productions Inc.)
- Distributed by: Keystone Entertainment
- Release date: October 5, 2001
- Running time: 87 minutes
- Countries: Canada; United States
- Language: English
- Budget: $2,000,000

MVP 2: Most Vertical Primate is a 2001 film, and the second in the MVP series. The film's title character, Jack, is a fictional chimpanzee. It is a sequel to MVP: Most Valuable Primate.

MVP 2: Most Vertical Primate was released by Keystone Entertainment on October 5, 2001 to negative reviews from critics.

== Plot ==
Jack is invited to play for the Seattle Simians hockey team, but when the Los Angeles Carjackers team sets Jack up by making it look like he bit the finger of one of the players, Jack leaves while other Simians players look for him. Jack meets Ben Johnson, a runaway orphan skater boy, who lives in a shack at an old pool. Over time, the two become best friends, but when a police officer finds out where Jack and Ben live, they have to leave the pool. When leaving the pool, Ben broke his board, but he was going to enter a skating competition and get sponsored.

Jack goes to Oliver Plant's dumpster full of old skateboard stuff, but Oliver finds Ben, who tells him about his board and the competition, so Oliver gives him a board to use. They stay with Oliver overnight, with him not knowing about the pool incident. When Oliver says "good night, Ben", Ben suspects him of knowing that he was a runaway. Jack asks him to stay since there is no other place to sleep, and Ben agrees.

Oliver gets a visit from someone who deals with children like Ben, so that night Oliver calls her and says he found Ben. The next day, they go to the competition, and when it's Ben's turn, he says he can't do it, but Jack realizes he has the uncanny ability to skateboard. He says he would ride with Ben, so Ben decides to do it. Ben wins the competition and gets sponsored by Bob Burnquist, and Oliver adopts Ben. Meanwhile, Louie, Jack's little brother, gets a ride to Seattle and pretends to be Jack, being terrible at hockey. Jack shows up and wins the ZHL cup for the Simians. After the Simians win and Jack and Louie decide to go back home, Ben gives Louie a skateboard so Jack can teach him.

== Cast ==
- Richard Karn as Ollie Plant
- Cameron Bancroft as Rob Poirier
- Robert Costanzo as Beat Cop
- Oliver Muirhead as Mr. Raheja
- Troy Ruptash as Tyson Fowler
- Patrick Cranshaw as Ron
- Scott Goodman as Ben Johnson
- Bob Burnquist as Himself
- Russell Ferrier as Darren
- Ian Bagg as Olaf Schickendanz
- Dolores Drake as Barbara
- Fred Keating as Coach Miller
- Craig March as Coach Skinner
- Brenna as Brenna Sometime's
- Gus Lynch as Bud Fulton
- Bernie and Louie as Jack
- Robert Jones as Dr. Franky
- Marnie Alton as Mandy

== Release ==
The film was released in Canada on October 5, 2001. It was given a limited release in the United States on January 11, 2002 for one weekend before its VHS and DVD a week later by Warner Home Video on January 22. As with its predecessor, Buena Vista Home Entertainment acquired certain distribution rights in some regions.

== Reception ==
On Rotten Tomatoes the film has three critic reviews listed, all negative and a 41% Popcornmeter.
