= Son of a Gun (film) =

2014 film by Julius Avery

- American theatrical release poster
- Directed by: Julius Avery
- Written by: Julius Avery
- Produced by: Timothy White
- Starring: Ewan McGregor; Brenton Thwaites; Alicia Vikander; Jacek Koman; Matt Nable; Tom Budge
- Cinematography: Nigel Bluck
- Edited by: Jack Hutchings
- Music by: Jed Kurzel
- Production companies: Altitude Film Sales; Hopscotch Entertainment One; Media House Capital; Daydream Productions; Screen Australia; ScreenWest; Lotterywest; Screen NSW
- Distributed by: A24; DirecTV (United States); Hopscotch Entertainment One (Australia and New Zealand); Koch Media (United Kingdom); Mongrel Media (Canada)
- Release dates: 16 October 2014 (Australia); 30 January 2015 (United Kingdom)
- Running time: 109 minutes
- Countries: Australia; United Kingdom; Canada
- Language: English
- Budget: $12 million
- Box office: $660,241

Son of a Gun is a 2014 crime thriller film written and directed by Julius Avery. It stars Ewan McGregor, Brenton Thwaites, Alicia Vikander, and Jacek Koman.

== Plot ==
A 19-year-old youth, JR, is sent to an Australian prison for a minor crime. His cellmate is being sexually abused by a prison gang led by a man named Dave. JR also meets the charismatic Brendan Lynch, a notorious Scottish armed robber. Later, JR finds his cellmate sharpening a shiv to defend himself. When Dave and his gang move against the cellmate, JR initiates a fight to forestall the attack. Lynch scolds JR for meddling, and soon after, JR's cellmate is again sexually assaulted and commits suicide. When Dave and his gang try to rape JR, Lynch and his men, Sterlo and Merv, rescue JR and kill Dave. In exchange for Lynch's protection during JR's sentence, JR agrees to perform tasks for Lynch once he is paroled.

Upon release six months later, JR meets crime lord Sam and his nephew Josh. JR is given an apartment and a briefcase of Lynch's personal effects, including a pistol. A young woman named Tasha arrives at the apartment to give JR cash and a cellphone. Following instructions, JR illegally purchases high-powered firearms and hijacks a scenic tour helicopter, forcing the pilot at gunpoint to extract Lynch and his gang under heavy gunfire. They continue their escape by car, but while Merv buys food at a convenience store, the other three discover from a radio broadcast that Merv lied about being incarcerated for GBH; he actually raped a schoolgirl. Lynch brutally beats Merv and expels him from the gang.

The three head to Sam's estate. There he recruits Lynch and his men to execute a gold heist at Kalgoorlie, with an expected payout in the millions. During a party at the estate, JR spots Tasha, whom he follows to the poolside, where Josh pushes him into the pool. JR, unable to swim, is rescued by Tasha, and the two go to a restaurant. Tasha reveals her relationship with Sam and tells JR that people who run from Sam are killed.

The next morning, Lynch warns JR not to be distracted by Tasha. They then visit the quarry they plan to rob. Lynch tells JR that his role in the heist will be to access the room with the gold and ensure that no employee presses a panic button. Lynch also recruits a speedway racer named Chris as the getaway driver. Back at Sam's estate, the gang plan the heist and a fight breaks out between JR and Josh. JR heads to the bar where he uses his gun to scare away some men who are harassing Tasha. Lacking proper immigration papers, she is angry with JR's impulsiveness, but she proposes meeting at the beach near his house. Later that night, JR sneaks out to meet Tasha; they go into the water and have sex.

The next day, the group infiltrates the quarry and inserts JR into the ventilation shaft above the gold room. JR successfully intimidates the employees into not pressing the panic button and lets the rest of the crew in. Lynch tells Josh to guard the employees while JR watches the gold poured into bars. This infuriates Josh, who shoots an employee in the leg, whereupon Lynch breaks Josh's nose. When police arrive, the crew, disguised as employees, carries six gold bars into the open while holding the real employees at gunpoint. Lynch releases the hostages and opens fire. Chris arrives with the getaway vehicle, but Sterlo is shot. Chris causes two pursuit vehicles to crash and the gang escapes. Sterlo dies after instructing Lynch to give his cut of the heist to his daughter.

Sam betrays Lynch, JR, and Tasha, but the three escape safely and travel to Melbourne, where Sam plans to meet his fence. JR and Lynch sabotage the rendezvous, killing Sam's henchman and kidnapping Josh. After interrogating him, they find the gold stashed in a storage unit.

Lynch and JR kill Sam at his estate, and Lynch offers JR $350,000 to leave. JR reveals that he realized Lynch would discard him once he had acquired the gold, so he masterminded a plan to steal the gold with Tasha and take half. Lynch has no choice but to accept JR's terms and wait, but a woman identifies Lynch, who is captured and jailed. Later JR sends Lynch a message detailing where the gold has been left for him, written on the back of a photo of a pregnant Tasha, hinting at an optimistic future.

== Cast ==
- Brenton Thwaites as Jesse Ryan 'JR' White
- Ewan McGregor as Brendan Lynch
- Alicia Vikander as Tasha
- Jacek Koman as Sam Lennox
- Matt Nable as Sterlo
- Tom Budge as Josh
- Nash Edgerton as Chris
- Damon Herriman as Wilson
- Russell Kiefel as Mick
- Eddie Baroo as Merv
- Phoenix Raei as Party Guest

== Production ==
Principal photography took place in late February 2013 in Perth, Kalgoorlie, and Melbourne, Australia. Prison scenes were filmed inside Casuarina Prison.

The film was produced by New Zealand producer Timothy White.

== Release ==
In May 2014, A24 and DirecTV Cinema acquired U.S distribution rights to the film. The film had premiered at the CinefestOZ Film Festival on 20 August 2014. The film screened at the London Film Festival on 17 October 2014.

The film opened in Australia on 16 October 2014. and was released on DirecTV Cinema on 11 December 2014, before being released in a limited release and through video on demand on 16 January 2015.

== Reception ==
Son of a Gun received mixed reviews from critics. It currently has a Rotten Tomatoes rating of 62% based on 76 reviews, with an average score of 5.7/10 and the consensus: "Gritty, stylish, and smart, Son of a Gun serves up plenty of genre thrills and offers a new change of pace from Ewan McGregor." On Metacritic, the film has a 49/100 rating based on 20 critics, indicating "mixed or average reviews".

== See also ==
- Cinema of Australia
