= Trevor Wright =

American actor (born 1980)

- Occupation: Actor
- Years active: 1993–2012

Trevor Wright is an American former actor.

== Career ==
His recurring role as Zack Powers on George Lopez and guest starring in television series such as NYPD Blue, Scrubs and Boston Public led to his being named in 2003 by Teen Vogue as a "young and upcoming star that's here to stay".

His very first break came through his involvement in music videos when, in 1989, Wright, along with fellow actor Elijah Wood, appeared in the video for Paula Abdul's single "Forever Your Girl," directed by David Fincher. He subsequently starred opposite singer Stacie Orrico in the videos for her singles "Stuck" (2003), and "I Could Be the One" (2004).

His first feature-film role was in 1993's Memories by Joe Frank, but his first major role was as "Zach" in the 2007 indie film Shelter, directed by Jonah Markowitz and co-starring Brad Rowe, Tina Holmes and Ross Thomas.

Wright's film roles include Vicious Circle, in which he appeared in the role of the character "Fin". He was the lead actor in Vacancy 2: The First Cut, that had a straight to DVD release on January 20, 2009. His 2010 films include The Social Network and 2001 Maniacs: Field of Screams.

Wright changed careers in 2012 and became a real estate agent in Los Angeles.

== Personal life ==
He was engaged to actress Odette Annable (née Yustman) until their breakup in 2008. He resides in Los Angeles, California.

Wright enjoys skateboarding, snowboarding, surfing and other similar activities.

== Filmography ==
Year	Title	Role	Notes
1993	Memories By Joe Frank	Young Joe Frank	Film
2000	Destiny Stalled	Uncredited role	Film
2000	Roswell	Cute Guy/"Neil"	Episode: "Into the Woods"
2001	Grounded for Life	Guy #1	Episode: "Jimmy's Got a Gun"
	Boston Public	Walton Hanks	Chapter 28 & 38
2002	Everwood	Student #1	Episode: "The Kissing Bridge"
2002	Looking Through Lillian	Beggar (uncredited)	Film
2003	Scrubs	Kid	Episode: "My New Old Friend"
2003	What I Like About You	(uncredited)	Episode: "Girls Night Out"
2003	The Division	Cody Phillips	Episode: "Rich Girl Poor Girl"
2003	MXP: Most Xtreme Primate	Jay	Video
2004	Listen Up	Jake	Episode: "Enemy at the Gates"
2004	George Lopez	Zack Powers	5 episodes
2004	NYPD Blue	Charles Slocum	Episode: "Colonel Knowledge"
2005	Special Ed	Mitch	Film
2006	Air Buddies	Grim	Film
2006	South Beach	Garret	Episode: "Every Day Above Ground Is a Good Day"
2006	CSI: NY	Perry Lohmann	Episode: "Risk"
2007	Shelter	Zach	Film
2008	Vicious Circle	Fin	Film
2009	Silver Street	Movie Usher	Short
2009	Vacancy 2: The First Cut	Caleb	Film
2010	2001 Maniacs: Field of Screams	Falcon	Film
2010	Scream Queens	Himself	2 episode
2010	The Social Network	B.U. Guy in Bra	Film
2010	BASHERT	Noah	Film
2012	Santa Paws 2: The Santa Pups	Baxter (voice)	Direct-to-DVD Disney film and last film acting role before retirement

=== Appearances in Music videos ===
- 1989: "Forever Your Girl" (by Paula Abdul) -- as Young James Dean
- 2003: "Stuck" by Stacie Orrico
- 2004: "I Could Be the One" by Stacie Orrico
