= A Perfect Stranger (novel) =

1982 romance novel by Danielle Steel

- First edition
- Author: Danielle Steel
- Language: English
- Genre: Romance novel
- Publisher: Dell
- Publication date: 1981
- Publication place: United States
- Media type: Print (Hardcover & Paperback)
- Pages: 278 pp
- ISBN: 0-440-17221-7
- OCLC: 8090861

A Perfect Stranger is a romance novel by American author Danielle Steel published in 1982. It is Steel's fourteenth novel.

== Plot ==
This book tells the story of Alexander Hale and Raphaella Phillips. Hale, a recently divorced man, takes a walk down his street, when he sees Phillips, a beautiful woman, crying on the steps. We later learn that the woman's name is Raphaella Phillips and that she is married to an eighty-year-old man who is very sick. Hale falls in love with Phillips, who is already married. Raphaella is young, while her husband is old and bedridden. Raphaella does not want to leave her husband but she does not want to stay closed away from the world with nothing to live for either. She has no children and feels like the house doesn't belong to her. In the end Raphaella's husband dies and Raphaella and Alexander can be together.

== Adaptation ==
The novel was adapted into a television film, Danielle Steel's A Perfect Stranger, in 1994.
