= Boxoffice International Pictures =

US film distributors

Boxoffice International Pictures, Inc.
- Company type: Film company
- Industry: Motion pictures
- Founded: September 11, 1950; 75 years ago
- Defunct: November 15, 2005
- Fate: Ceased operations
- Headquarters: Los Angeles, California
- Key people: Harry Novak

Boxoffice International Pictures, Inc. was a film distributor owned by Harry Novak, who later used the alternate name Harry Novak Productions. It ceased operations in 2005.

== Background ==
Harry Novak was born in Chicago in 1928, and began working for RKO Pictures when he was a teenager. He started out by distributing posters and lobby cards to film exhibitors. He then enlisted in the Army, and after leaving the service, he returned to the company, which was now controlled by Howard Hughes. In his new position, he advanced to booking and selling films and designing ads.

In the 1960s, he started Boxoffice International Pictures. His films were mostly soft-core sexploitation, and featured rural settings and cornpone humor. He recycled the old stereotypes like the traveling salesman and the farmer's daughter; the city girl who goes wild after her first taste of moonshine; into sex comedies that "pandered to bumpkin clichés". The simulated sex portrayed in his films was poorly staged and photographed. In 1964, he used the pseudonym Seymour Tuchus and made the film "Dr Breedlove", a spoof of The Bride of Frankenstein and Dr Strangelove. The movie was a quick turnaround, he shot it in just six days. To avoid a lawsuit from Stanley Kubrick, he was forced to quickly rename it to Kiss Me Quick! .

== Selected filmography ==
When I was a kid, my daddy told me, 'There's a buyer for everything,' and I lived to find out that he was right.

— Harry Novak —

Title	Year	Director	Notes
Lisa, Lisa	1977	Frederick R. Friedel	
The Child	1977	Robert Voskanian	
Rattlers	1976	John McCauley	
Tanya	1976	Nate Rodgers	
Dr. Frankenstein's Castle of Freaks	1974	Dick Randall	
Tower of Love	1974	George Drazich	
The Sinful Dwarf	1973	Vidal Raski	
Sassy Sue	1973	Bethel Buckalew	
Please Don't Eat My Mother!	1973	Carl Monson	
A Scream in the Streets	1973	Carl Monson	
Toys Are Not for Children	1972	Stanley H. Brassloff	
Requiem for a Vampire	1971	Jean Rollin	
The Dark Side of Tomorrow	1970	Jack Deerson, Barbara Peeters	
A Girl Called Jules	1970	Tonino Valerii	
The Nude Vampire	1970	Jean Rollin	
Sinkhole	1970	Toshio Okuwaki	
Booby Trap	1970	Dwayne Avery	
Two Thousand Weeks	1969	Tim Burstall	
Any Body...Any Way	1968	Charles Romine	
The Muthers	1968	Donald A. Davis	
Venus in Furs	1967	Joseph Marzano	
The Girl with the Hungry Eyes	1967	William Rotsler	
Kiss Me Quick!	1964	Peter Perry Jr.	

== Notes ==
1.Titles listed in common English title.
2.Directors listed with given names, ignoring pseudonyms and misspelled credits.
