= Kartalian =

Kartalian, Kartalyan (Armenian: Քարթալյան, derived from Turkish "kartal" meaning "dark, murky color" or "eagle") is an Armenian surname. Notable people with the surname include:

- Buck Kartalian (1922–2016), American wrestler and actor
- Jason Kartalian, American film producer, director, and writer
