= The Cat and the Fiddle =

The Cat and the Fiddle may refer to:

- "Hey Diddle Diddle" or "The Cat and the Fiddle", a nursery rhyme
- The Cat and the Fiddle (musical), a 1931 Broadway production by Jerome Kern and Otto Harbach
- The Cat and the Fiddle (film), a 1934 adaptation the stage musical
- The Cat and the Fiddle (album), a 1977 album by Papa John Creach
- "The Cat and the Fiddle" (Batman), a 1966 television episode
- The Cat and the Fiddle (play), a 1971 play by John McDonnell

== See also ==
- The Cat & Fiddle, British pub in Hollywood, California
- Cat and Fiddle Arcade, a shopping mall in Hobart, Tasmania, Australia
- Cat and Fiddle Inn, Cheshire, England
- Cat and Fiddle Road, England, named after the inn
- Cats and the Fiddle, an African American singing group
