= The Child (1977 film) =

1977 American supernatural horror by Robert Voskanian

- Theatrical release poster
- Directed by: Robert Voskanian
- Written by: Ralph Lucas
- Produced by: Robert Dadashian
- Starring: Laurel Barnett; Rosalie Cole; Frank Janson; Richard Hanners; Ruth Ballan
- Cinematography: Mori Alavi
- Edited by: Robert Voskanian; Robert Dadashian
- Music by: Rob Wallace
- Production company: Panorama Films
- Distributed by: Boxoffice International Pictures; Valiant International Pictures
- Release date: January 19, 1977
- Running time: 83 minutes
- Country: United States
- Language: English
- Budget: $100,000

The Child (also known as Kill and Go Hide and Zombie Child) is a 1977 American supernatural horror film directed by Robert Voskanian, and starring Laurel Barnett, Rosalie Cole, Frank Janson, and Richard Hanners. Set in the 1930s, it follows a young woman who takes a job as a nanny at a decrepit, isolated manor where a series of strange incidents begin to occur.

The film was developed by director Voskanian and producer Robert Dadashian, both film students, from a screenplay by Ralph Lucas. Principal photography began in 1973 in the Boyle Heights section of Los Angeles. An independent production, the film took approximately three years to complete due to funding issues.

The Child was given a regional release in the United States beginning on January 19, 1977 by Harry Novak's Boxoffice International Pictures. The film frequently played at drive-in theaters, sometimes paired as a double feature with Axe (1974).

== Plot ==
In early-20th century rural California, Alicianne Del Mar takes a job as a nanny at the dilapidated Nordon estate. After accidentally crashing her car en route, she wanders through the woods to locate the home, confident she will be able to as she was raised nearby and is familiar with the region. She is met by Mrs. Whitfield, an elderly woman walking her dog, who directs Alicianne to the Nordon residence. In the woods, Alicianne sees a mutilated cat, and later, what appears to be a clawed hand gripping the edge of a tree. While approaching the Nordon home, she stumbles upon an abandoned cemetery, where she witnesses a pallid figure cower behind underbrush. Frightened, Alicianne flees toward the house.

She is met by Mr. Nordon, a widower who lives in the large home with his adult son, Len, and the young Rosalie. Unbeknownst to Alicianne, Rosalie has telekinetic abilities. Len confides in Alicianne that his mother was murdered in the woods by tramps years prior. Mrs. Whitfield, who is considered a nosy nuisance to the Nordons, is attacked at her home by an unseen presence. When she tries to flee, Rosalie appears outside, taunting her and saying she has brought her "friends". Mrs. Whitfield goes to hide in her basement, but is attacked by a claw-handed figure who rips out one of her eyes before murdering her.

On Halloween, Alicianne witnesses a jack o' lantern moving on its own in the den. The same night, Rosalie, dressed as a witch, wanders into the woods to a shack occupied by one of the tramps who murdered her mother; she confronts the man, who is in possession of her mother's jewelry, while an unseen assailant uses a shotgun to kill him. Later, Rosalie's father rebukes her for sneaking out of the house, and questions why she spends so much time in the abandoned cemetery near the home. Rosalie is defiant, and accuses him of killing her mother.

Len finds the tramp's corpse in the shack, and Alicianne subsequently witnesses a mutated figure peering into the window. While Len is outside, Alicianne finds his father's corpse on the stairwell, his eye removed. Alicianne and Len flee, but Len's car breaks down as they attempt to drive away. The two are suddenly attacked by a mob of decayed zombies—the "friends" of Rosalie, whom she summons from the cemetery to commit evil deeds at her whim. Alicianne and Len manage to distract the zombies with the car horn, and barricade themselves in an abandoned factory building. The zombies eventually infiltrate, dragging Len beneath the floorboards and mutilating his head. Alicianne, now alone, hears a door opening, and attacks the intruder with an axe, only realizing moments later that it is Rosalie who she has bludgeoned. Alicianne watches in shock as Rosalie dies, and staggers out of the building in a daze.

== Cast ==
- Laurel Barnett as Alicianne Del Mar
- Rosalie Cole as Rosalie Nordon
- Frank Janson as Nordon
- Richard Hanners as Len Nordon
- Ruth Ballan as Mrs. Whitfield
- Rod Medigovich as Priest / Creature
- Wendell Hudiburg as Pallbearer
- Chris Tieken as Jefferson

== Production ==
=== Development ===
The Child began as a project by Robert Voskanian and Robert Dadashian, two Armenian immigrant film students at Columbia College Hollywood. Inspired to make a horror film after seeing Night of the Living Dead (1968), the two acquired a screenplay by Ralph Lucas and began developing the project, raising a $100,000 budget to make the film.

=== Casting ===
The majority of the cast of The Child were first-time film actors with no prior feature film experience, with the exception of Frank Janson, who portrays the patriarch Nordon. Laurel Barnett was cast in the lead role of Alicianne after responding to an advertisement in a local actors' publication; she particularly impressed Voskanian as she arrived at her meeting with him wearing the period clothing appropriate to the character. Barnett had some experience as a stage actress, and had made appearances on the television series Barnaby Jones and Medical Center. Ruth Ballan, who portrays the nosy neighbor Mrs. Whitfield, was a stage actress who had no film experience. Richard Hanners, who was cast as Len, was also a stage actor who had an uncredited role in Lepke (1975).

=== Filming ===
The Child had a protracted production due to funding issues. Principal photography began in Los Angeles in 1973, but, due to repeated delays, the film was not completed until 1976. The film was shot without sound, and dubbed in post-production. To eliminate troubles with acquiring buildings for indoor shooting, the interior sequences were prioritized initially and completed first. Some interiors, such as the residence of Mrs. Whitfield, were filmed inside a condemned former convent in the Boyle Heights section of Los Angeles, though the exteriors of the Whitfield residence were shot at cinematographer Mori Alavi's actual residence.

The majority of the outdoors sequences were filmed in oil fields near Los Angeles, which were owned by Standard Oil. Among these were the scenes that took place at the cemetery, which was constructed by Voskanian and Dadashian. A private home on La Cienega Boulevard served as the exterior of the Nordon estate, which was adjacent to the oil fields, though much of the interiors of the Nordon home were filmed inside the abandoned convent that also stood in for the Whitfield residence.

Because the budget was so limited, the actors and crew took on various roles: Barnett, who portrayed the lead of Alicianne, also served as a costumer for the production, helping curate vintage period clothing from thrift shops in Hollywood. Dadashian's parents helped cater the production, serving Armenian dishes to the cast and crew, while both Voskanian and Dadashian acted as cameramen, set dressers, and various other roles to ensure the project was completed.

== Release ==
The Child was acquired by Boxoffice International Pictures during the post-production process, with studio head Harry Novak supplying funds for Voskanian to complete editing the film. The film received a regional release on January 19, 1977 in the United States, screening in Tennessee, Indiana, and Kentucky; it also opened in Rome, Italy on the same date. It later opened in Victoria, Texas on March 11, 1977. The film was sometimes paired as a double feature with Axe (1974), another horror film executive-produced by Harry Novak.

In 1983, the film was theatrically reissued by New American Films under the alternative title Kill and Go Hide.

=== Home media ===
Exploited Video issued the film on videocassette under the title Zombie Child, with a Novak interview added as a bonus feature. Something Weird Video released the film on DVD on September 25, 2001. It was later issued on Blu-ray in 2019 by Arrow Video as part of the American Horror Project: Volume 2 set, which also includes the films Dark August and Dream No Evil.

== Reception ==
TV Guide gave The Child an unfavorable review, awarding it one star out of five, and deeming it "a dull supernatural tale set in a remote woodland area in the 1930s." Bob Keaton of the Fort Lauderdale News panned the film for its gory content and "amateurish" performances, as well as likening its cinematography to that of "home movies." Linda Gross of the Los Angeles Times noted that the film begins like a "Gothic novel" but felt that it was weakened by an implausible screenplay, "low-brow" special effects, and murky cinematography.

Jeffrey Kauffman, writing for the website "Blu-ray.com" gave it 2.5 stars out of 5 and said: "If you see only one film about a murderous telekinetically inclined lass who likes to sic zombies on those whom she disfavors, make it The Child, as there probably aren't too many others with this patently odd combination of plot points. This is another lo-fi horror offering that is really strong on mood, but occasionally lacking in narrative momentum and logic."

Bill Gibron of PopMatters gave the film a positive review, calling it "a surprisingly effective and incredibly creepy zombie workout"; praising the atmosphere, direction, and sense of unease.

Scott Aaron Stine, writing in The Gorehound's Guide to Splatter Films of the 1980s (2003), praised the film as "a fairly taut and well made little low-budget zombie flick" and "a charming obscurity," despite critiquing the film's dubbed dialogue.

== See also ==
- List of films set around Halloween

== Sources ==
- Alexander, Chris (2025). Art! Trash! Terror!: Adventures in Strange Cinema (ebook). Oxford, England: Headpress. ISBN 978-1-915-31644-8.
- Stine, Scott Aaron (2003). The Gorehound's Guide to Splatter Films of the 1980s. Jefferson, North Carolina: McFarland & Company. ISBN 978-0-786-41532-8.
- Thrower, Stephen (2007). Nightmare USA: The Untold Story of the Exploitation Independents. Godalming, Surrey: FAB Press. ISBN 978-1-903254-52-3.
- Thrower, Stephen; Voskanian, Robert; Dadashian, Robert (2019). The Child (Blu-ray audio commentary). Arrow Films. OCLC 1120130043.
