= Joseph Caputo =

Joseph Caputo is the name of:

- Joe Cabot (1921–2016), Joseph Caputo, musician
- Joseph Caputo (OITNB), fictional character
