= Trapped Beneath the Sea =

- Based on: The Johnson Sea Link accident in June 1973
- Written by: Stanford Whitmore
- Directed by: William A. Graham
- Starring: Lee J. Cobb; Martin Balsam; Joshua Bryant; Paul Michael Glaser; Cliff Potts
- Narrated by: Howard K. Smith
- Music by: Joel Hirschhorn; Al Kasha
- Country of origin: United States
- Original language: English

Production
- Producer: Frank Capra Jr.
- Cinematography: Terry Meade
- Editors: Ronald J. Fagan; Marshall Neilan
- Running time: 97 minutes
- Production company: ABC Circle Films

Original release
- Network: ABC
- Release: October 22, 1974

Trapped Beneath the Sea is a 1974 American made-for-television action drama film directed by William A. Graham. The screenplay concerns four men trapped in a mini-submarine in waters off the coast of Florida. Paul Michael Glaser, Joshua Bryant, Cliff Potts and Roger Kern play the victims. Lee J. Cobb and Martin Balsam are among those trying to rescue them. The film premiered as the ABC Movie of the Week on October 22, 1974.

== Cast ==
- Lee J. Cobb as Victor Bateman
- Martin Balsam as T.C. Hollister
- Paul Michael Glaser as Jack Beech
- Joshua Bryant as Sam Wallants
- Barra Grant as Grace Wallants
- Cliff Potts as Gordon Gaines
- Warren Kemmerling as Cmdr. Prestwick
- Laurie Prange as Chris Moffet
- Phillip Richard Allen as Lt. Cmdr. Hanratty
- Redmond Gleeson as PO1 Stanton
- Roger Kern as Jeff Turley
- S. John Launer as Capt. Osborn
- Rod Perry as Jimmy
- William Wintersole as Cmdr. Robbins
- Simon Deckard as Dr. Lewison
- Fred Franklyn (credited as Fredric Franklyn) as Howard Wynter
- Norman Honath as Sailor #1
- Andy Knight as Sailor #2
- Hunter von Leer as Seaman Schrier
- Howard K. Smith as Narrator

== See also ==
- List of American films of 1974
