= Toys Are Not for Children =

- Directed by: Stanley H. Brassloff
- Screenplay by: Macs McAree
- Story by: Stanley H. Brassloff
- Starring: Marcia Forbes; Harlan Cary Poe; Evelyn Kingsle; Luis Arroyo; Fran Warren
- Cinematography: Rolph Laube
- Edited by: Jerry Siegel
- Music by: Lenny Hambro; Emmanuel Vardi; Jacques Urbont
- Distributed by: Boxoffice International Pictures
- Release date: June 14, 1972 (Philadelphia)
- Running time: 85 minutes
- Country: United States
- Language: English

Toys Are Not for Children is a 1972 American exploitation film directed by Stanley H. Brassloff and starring Marcia Forbes, Harlan Cary Poe, Evelyn Kingsley, and Fran Warren. Its plot follows a developmentally-stunted young woman, obsessed with her absent father, who delves into a world of prostitution. The film was also released under the titles How to Make Love to a Virgin and Virgin Dolls.

== Plot ==
Jamie Godard is a naive, emotionally-stunted young woman who was raised by her single mother, Edna, after her philandering father abandoned their family. Though her father was absent, he frequently sent Jamie toys, which she became fixated on, developing a concurrent father complex. As an adult, Jamie works in a toy store in upstate New York. She marries her co-worker, Charlie Belmond, but finds herself unable to consummate their marriage; Charlie is disturbed by Jamie's obsession with the various toys she has accumulated from her father.

At the toy store, Jamie meets Pearl Valdi, a middle-aged store patron from Manhattan who purchases a toy oven for her daughter. The two strike a conversation, and Pearl offers to meet with Jamie during her next visit to the city. Jamie is impervious to the fact that Pearl is in fact a prostitute, though Edna suspects Pearl is one of the women that her husband had relations with. When Edna finds that Jamie has visited Pearl, she throws her out of the house. During one of her visits to Pearl's, Pearl's pimp, Eddie, attempts to rape Jamie, but Pearl saves her. Later, frustrated by Jamie's lack of intimacy, Charlie goes to a local bar to pursue sex, but is spotted by his and Jamie's boss, who chastises him for flirting with other women.

Pearl finally reveals to Jamie that she is a prostitute, and admits to knowing Jamie's father, who was one of her johns. After moving in with Pearl and Eddie, Jamie reluctantly agrees to allow Eddie to take her virginity in Pearl's absence, during which the two engage in sexual roleplay in which Jamie refers to Eddie as her "daddy". After, Eddie appoints Jamie as one of his new prostitutes, much to Pearl's upset, as she feels protective of her. Charlie visits Edna seeking Jamie's whereabouts; Edna gives him Pearl's address, and dismisses Jamie, telling him she has disowned her.

Meanwhile, Jamie callowly begins her career as a prostitute, engaging in further father-daughter roleplay with various men. Charlie soon reaches Pearl's apartment, where Jamie arrives shortly after, and the two finally engage in sex despite Jamie's initial reluctance. Jamie's prostitution endeavors prove fruitful as she begins to earn a significant amount of money, much to Pearl's dismay, as she begs Eddie to put a stop to it. In a radical, desperate attempt to save Jamie from a life of prostitution, Pearl orchestrates a meeting between Jamie and her father, Phillip; Jamie believes it to simply be a familial reunion, while Phillip, unaware that Jamie is in fact his daughter, is under the impression that it is a casual sexual encounter with a random prostitute.

Jamie arrives at Phillip's hotel room, while Pearl regretfully attempts to phone him to stop the encounter, but is unable to reach him. Jamie psychologically regresses to her childhood, and lies in bed, asking Phillip tuck her in; her childlike demeanor is assumed to be mere roleplay by Phillip. The two then have sex. Afterward, Jamie informs Phillip she has kept all the toys he sent her over the years; a bewildered Phillip realizes that he has just engaged in incest with his daughter. Phillip orders Jamie to leave, which sends her into a psychological breakdown, during which she pushes him out the window to his death. Jamie collapses on the floor in a catatonic state.

== Cast ==
- Marcia Forbes as Jamie Godard
  - Tiberia Mitri as young Jamie
- Harlan Cary Poe as Charlie Belmond
- Evelyn Kingsley as Pearl Valdi
- Luis Arroyo as Eddie
- Fran Warren as Edna Godard
- Peter Lightstone as Phillip Godard
- N. J. Osrag as Max Geunther
- Ronnie Kahn as Hank

== Production ==
The film was directed by Stanley H. Brassloff, a native of Philadelphia, based on a story he had heard in the 1950s in which a woman unknowingly had sex with her father.

== Release ==
The film premiered theatrically in Philadelphia on June 14, 1972.

=== Home media ===
Something Weird Video released the film as a double-feature DVD with The Toybox (1971) in 2003.

In October 2019, Arrow Films released the film for the first time on Blu-ray in the United States and United Kingdom.
