= Any Body...Any Way =

Any body…Any way
- Directed by: Charles Romine
- Written by: Charles Romine; Stanley H. Brassloff
- Produced by: Stanley H. Brassloff
- Starring: Eve Reeves; Joyce Denner; Daniel Garth
- Cinematography: Victor Petrashevic
- Edited by: Kemper Peacock; Norman Colbert
- Music by: Harvey R. Kugler
- Production company: SHB Productions
- Distributed by: Boxoffice International Pictures
- Release date: 1968
- Running time: 80 Minutes
- Country: United States
- Language: English

Any Body...Any Way (re-released under the name Behind Locked Doors) is a 1968 sexploitation "roughie" film directed by Charles Romine and starring Eve Reeves, Joyce Denner and Daniel Garth.

== Plot ==
While attending a party with her workmate Terry Wilson at an isolated barn, Ann Henderson is assaulted, but is saved in the nick of time by Mr. Bradley. Ann and Terry decide to leave, ditching Ann's boyfriend, but find themselves stranded when their car is inexplicably out of gas. They are advised by a strange man who happens to be walking past that there is a nearby house whose owners may be able to help.

Arriving at the house, the two girls discover the owners to be Mr. Bradley and his sister Ida. With the phone out and the Bradleys' car being serviced, the girls accept the Bradleys' offer of dinner and a warm bed for the night. The girls comment on the isolation one must feel living so remotely and Ida agrees; apparently, she has only been there for two years since her brother retired from his successful career as a mortician, and is still not used to it. The seemingly kind offer of a night's rest soon becomes unsettling when the girls discover bars on the guestroom windows, their door locked and a closet full of odd-sized women's clothing. With no option but to stay put, the girls try to sleep. During the night, Ann rejects Terry's sexual advances, but the two remain close to each other while stuck in the unnerving situation.

The following day, the girls try to leave but are prevented by the Bradleys and their assistant, the strange man they first met. They are subjected to the sexual experiments of the deranged siblings. When Terry attempts to escape again, the girls are shown a warning of things to come in the form of embalmed bodies of girls that the Bradleys had previously punished. Determined to not become victims, Ann and Terry concoct a ploy to overpower their captors. The Bradleys are beaten and the girls escape, during which the monument room of embalmed women is set alight and the previous victims' bodies are seen to take their revenge from the beyond by taking their murderers with them into the blaze.

Ann and Terry take flight, running back to their location from the previous day. In the final scene, Ann and Terry attend a party at a very familiar looking barn. Terry seduces a young woman and Ann walks off hand-in-hand with her original assailant.

== Cast ==
- Eve Reeves as Ann Henderson
- Joyce Danner as Terry Wilson
- Daniel Garth as Mr. Bradley
- Ivan Agar as Handyman
- Irene Lawrence as Ida
- Andrea Beatrice
- Allan Michaels
- Madeleine Le Roux
- Christina Piroska
