= Fran Warren =

American singer (1926–2013)

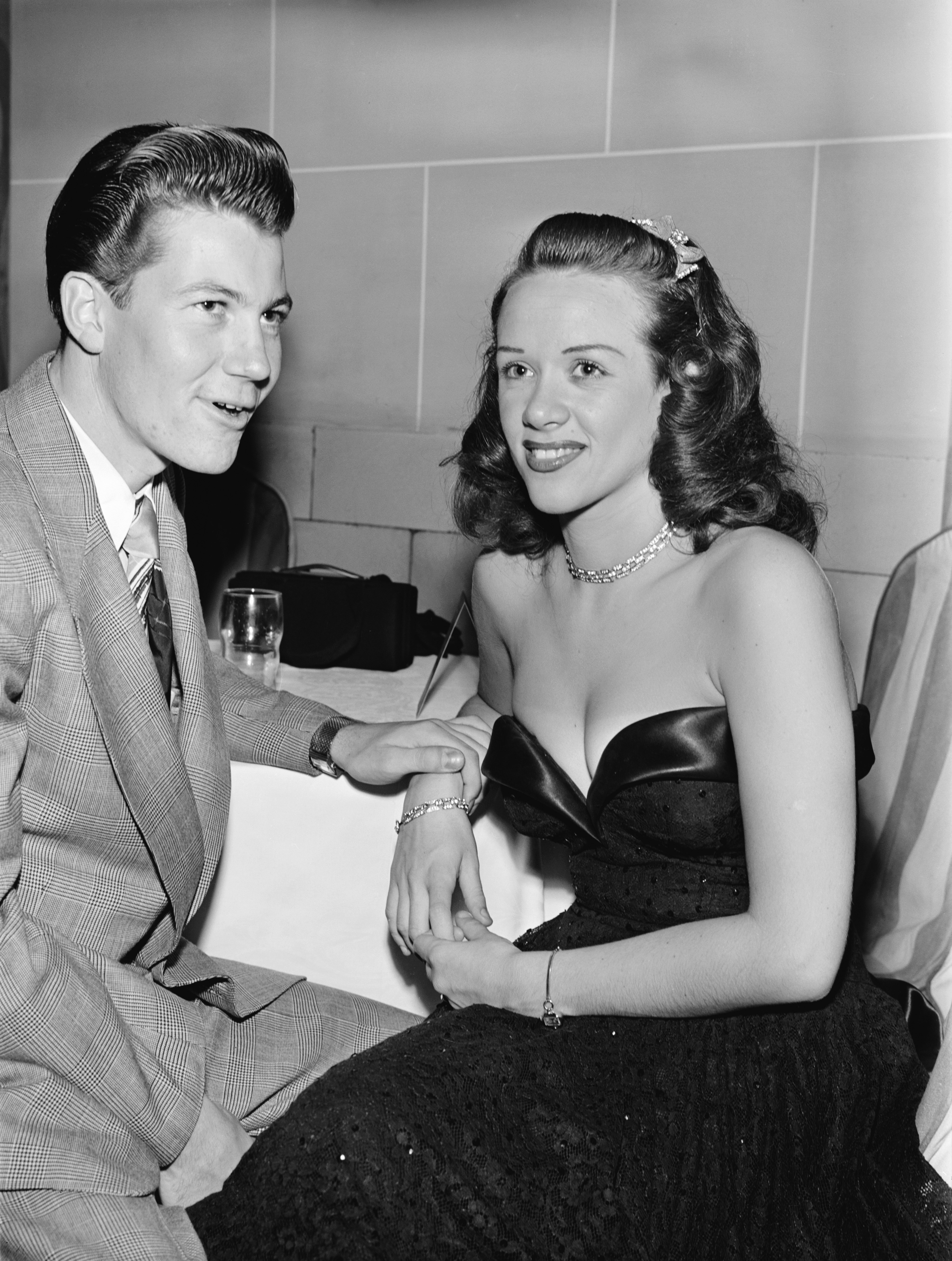
- Gene Williams and Warren, New York City, c. October 1947

Background information
- Born: Frances Wolfe; March 4, 1926; The Bronx, New York, U.S.
- Died: March 4, 2013 (aged 87) Brookfield, Connecticut, U.S.
- Occupation: Singer
- Years active: 1947–1978

Frances Wolfe (March 4, 1926 – March 4, 2013), known professionally as Fran Warren, was an American singer.

== Biography ==
Born Frances Wolfe, Warren was raised in a Jewish family in The Bronx, New York on March 4, 1926. After some time in a chorus line at the Roxy Theater, she joined Art Mooney's big band and worked with Billy Eckstine, who gave her the name "Fran Warren". Warren spent almost two years with the Charlie Barnet band before achieving some recognition with Claude Thornhill. In 1947, she reached the music charts for the first time with the song "A Sunday Kind of Love" written by her manager, Barbara Belle.

Warren began a solo career in 1948 when she signed a contract with RCA Victor. She had a hit record with "I Said My Pajamas (and Put On My Pray'rs)", a duet with Tony Martin which reached No. 3 on the charts. During the same year, she sang on the radio program Sing It Again. In the early 1950s, after a number of her records failed to chart, she signed with MGM Records. Her last chart hit was "It's Anybody's Heart" in 1953. Her albums included Hey There! Here's Fran Warren arranged by Marty Paich and Something's Coming arranged by Ralph Burns and Al Cohn. Warren performed in the Broadway musicals Mame, South Pacific, and The Pajama Game.

During the 1960s, Warren toured with the band led by trumpeter Harry James. On October 14, 1964, Warren and her brother Max Wolfe were arrested for possession of marijuana when police searched their apartments for evidence related to a $900,000 swindling scheme at a May's department store. Warren was in a car parked outside of a Manhattan bank when George Witt, a real estate agent and Warren's then-boyfriend, was arrested after he withdrew $1,090 from a safe deposit box. Witt and George Agro, a jewelry salesman, were arrested on charges of grand larceny, forgery, and conspiracy.

Aaron E. Koota, the acting Brooklyn District Attorney, stated Warren was Witt's girlfriend and "believed to have full knowledge of the May's conspiracy." Warren and her brother were arraigned at the Manhattan Criminal Court and released without bail for a further hearing. A week later, Warren refused to testify before a grand jury, which prompted New York State Supreme Court Justice Julius Helfand to hold her in contempt. He later sentenced her to 30 days in jail and imposed a $250 fine. On October 23, Warren returned to the grand jury and testified for 45 minutes. Warren said afterwards that her singing engagements through February 1965 had been cancelled, which would cost her between $50,000 to $75,000 as a result. In January 1965, the grand jury dismissed the narcotics charges against Warren and her brother.

Due to a morality clause in her contract with American Guild of Variety Artists (AGVA), Warren's professional engagements dropped sharply for the remainder of the decade. Between 1967 to 1978, her professional income was $2,000 a year. After her arrest, Witt, now her husband, pleaded guilty to attempted grand larceny and served two years in Danamora Prison. When he was released, they moved to California where Witt was hired as an office equipment supplier.

In November 1977, Joe Cabot, who had been her conductor since 1959, urged Warren to come to New York for a one‐week engagement to substitute for Margaret Whiting. Warren took the engagement, her first in New York since she had played at the Riverboat nightclub since 1964. During this time, Warren's lawsuit against the City of New York went to trial later in January 1978. A year later, she received $500,000 in a settlement for abuse of judicial process and malicious prosecution.

== Personal life ==
Warren was first married to Herman "Woody" Witt, with whom they had two daughters. They divorced in 1983. She lived in Connecticut until her death on March 4, 2013, her 87th birthday.

== Filmography ==
Year	Title	Role	Notes
1951	Mr. Imperium	Fredda	Singing voice, Uncredited
1952	Abbott and Costello Meet Captain Kidd	Lady Jane	
1972	Toys Are Not for Children	Edna Godard	(final film role)

== Discography ==
- Mood Indigo (MGM, 1956)
- Hey There! Here's Fran Warren - arr. & conducted by Marty Paich (Tops, 1957)
- Come Rain or Come Shine - arr. & conducted by Marty Paich (Venise, 1959)
- Something's Coming - arr. by Ralph Burns and Al Cohn (Warwick, 1960)
- Come into My World - arr. by Al Cohn and Joe Cabot (Audio Fidelity, 1968)
- Fran Warren in Nashville - arr. by Slim Williamson (Audio Fidelity, 1969)
- The Complete Fran Warren with Claude Thornhill Orchestra (Collector's Choice, 2000)
- Let's Fall in Love (Dutton Vocalion, 2003)
