= Please Don't Eat My Mother =

1973 film by Carl Monson

- Theatrical release poster
- Directed by: Carl J. Monson
- Written by: Eric Norden
- Produced by: Carl J. Monson; Harry N. Hovak
- Starring: Buck Kartalian; Lyn Lundgren; Art Hedberg; Rene Bond
- Edited by: Paul Heslin
- Distributed by: Boxoffice International Pictures
- Release date: March 5, 1973
- Running time: 98 minutes
- Country: United States
- Language: English

Please Don't Eat My Mother is a 1973 exploitation film directed by Carl J. Monson.

It is an adult-themed parody of Roger Corman's The Little Shop of Horrors. The film depicts the relationship between a timid man and his female carnivorous plant.

== Plot ==
A shy and timid man, Henry, who lives with his mother, buys a plant after he thinks he hears it talk to him. His loneliness is very apparent in the way he tries to turn the plant into a friend. The plant turns out to actually be able to talk in a seductive woman's voice. Henry soon discovers the plant likes to eat bugs (and then frogs and dogs and cats. He draws the line at elephants). Eventually the plant wants to try a delicious woman, like in the pictures Henry has hanging in his room.

One day, Henry's mother breaks into his room thinking to confront him with a woman and all she can find are Henry and the plant. But soon the plant eats her and discovers that women are really tasty. When detective O'Columbus shows up, the plant discovers she does not like eating men, just women.

Eventually the plant experiences urges and Henry finds a male specimen. The male plant eats men while the female plant eats women. One woman is willing to end Henry's life of virginity but accidentally gets eaten. Henry is broken and tries to kill himself while the plants get passionate with one another. Henry is too clumsy to succeed and changes his mind when he sees all of the little baby plants.

== Cast ==
- Buck Kartalian as Henry Fudd
- Lyn Lundgren as Clarice Fudd
- Art Hedberg as Florist
- Rene Bond as Harry's wife
- Alice Fredlund as Call girl
- Adam Blair
- Flora Weisel as Girl in Car
- Ric Lutze as Harry
- Carl Monson (uncredited) as Officer O'Columbus
- Zach Moye

== See also ==
- List of American films of 1973
