= Hot Off the Griddle =

- Batman episode
- Episode no.: Season 2 Episode 3
- Directed by: Don Weis
- Written by: Stanley Ralph Ross
- Production code: 9706-Pt. 1
- Original air date: September 14, 1966

Guest appearances
- Jack Kelly; Buck Kartalian; George Barrows; Charles Horvath; Edy Williams; Special Guest Villainess: Julie Newmar as The Catwoman

Episode chronology
← Previous "Walk the Straight and Narrow"	Next → "The Cat and the Fiddle"

"Hot Off the Griddle" is the 37th episode of the 1960s Batman television series. It guest starred Julie Newmar as The Catwoman.

== Plot ==
Commissioner James Gordon, Chief Miles O'Hara and the Dynamic Duo suspect that Selina Kyle, the Catwoman has returned to open a school for cat burglars. She tips them off to her presence after her "Catmen" (John, Charles, and Thomas) snatch a catalogue, a catamaran and three mittens. Batman and Robin ask gossip columnist Jack O'Shea to pen a fake story about a rare canary at the Natural History Museum in order to snare her. However, Jack is secretly in league with Catwoman (for simply no reason other than force of habit, criminal by nature or simply having a failed career) and he tips her off with the information needed. Consequently, Batman and Robin are ambushed at their Museum stakeout by the henchmen, paralyzed by Catwoman's tranquilizer darts and thrown out the window. They are saved from certain doom by a safety net, later revealing they set it up just in case the bird was dropped out the window.

Batman and Robin manage to capture one of Catwoman's henchmen who along with a new single called "Catusi" by Benedict Arnold and the Traitors leads them to a nightclub called the "Pink Sand Box", which is Catwoman's new hideout. It soon turns out to be a trap, however. There they are quickly deposited by a revolving booth into a room with a metal floor. Catwoman makes the floor red-hot, forcing them to "dance the hot-foot". Hoping to lower the floor's temperature, the Caped Crusader bursts an overhead water pipe, only to unwittingly release "Catatonic", a gas which renders him and Robin unconscious. They recover outside, strapped to aluminum grills, their bodies greased with margarine and two giant magnifying glasses poised directly over them, with the intent of roasting them alive in the midday sun...
