= The Cat and the Fiddle (Batman) =

- Batman episode
- Episode no.: Season 2 Episode 4
- Directed by: Don Weis
- Written by: Stanley Ralph Ross
- Production code: 9706-Pt. 2
- Original air date: September 15, 1966

Guest appearances
- Jack Kelly; Buck Kartalian; George Barrows; Charles Horvath; Edy Williams; Special Guest Villain: Julie Newmar as The Catwoman

Episode chronology
← Previous "Hot Off the Griddle"	Next → "The Minstrel's Shakedown"

"The Cat and the Fiddle" is the 38th episode of the 1960s Batman television series. It guest starred Julie Newmar as Catwoman.

== Plot ==
Batman and Robin barely escape from their hot ordeal and track Catwoman's next step. Catwoman disguises herself as a wealthy and elderly recluse – Minerva Matthews – to exchange a quarter million dollars each for two Stradivarius violins. Once the instruments are safely in her hands, the villainess reveals her true identity and demands the cash back. But Catwoman is surprised to learn that her business partner – Zubin Zucchini - – is also not who he appears to be, and is actually Robin, the Boy Wonder. When Batman saves Catwoman from falling to her death from the 102-story Gotham State Building after a failed escape attempt, she thanks Batman for doing so and asks him if he's spoken for. Later at police headquarters, Catwoman thanks Batman for helping her during her trial, nuzzles him gently after he states that no matter how much time goes by there will always be a man waiting for a woman as beautiful as herself and she finally bids him farewell. Surprised by her small gesture of affection, Batman is left in a confused daze causing Commissioner Gordon to ask, "Why, Batman, are you blushing?" to which Batman answers, "It's the heat of the day, Commissioner. Unseasonably warm, don't you think?"
