= USS Fred T. Berry =

Gearing-class destroyer

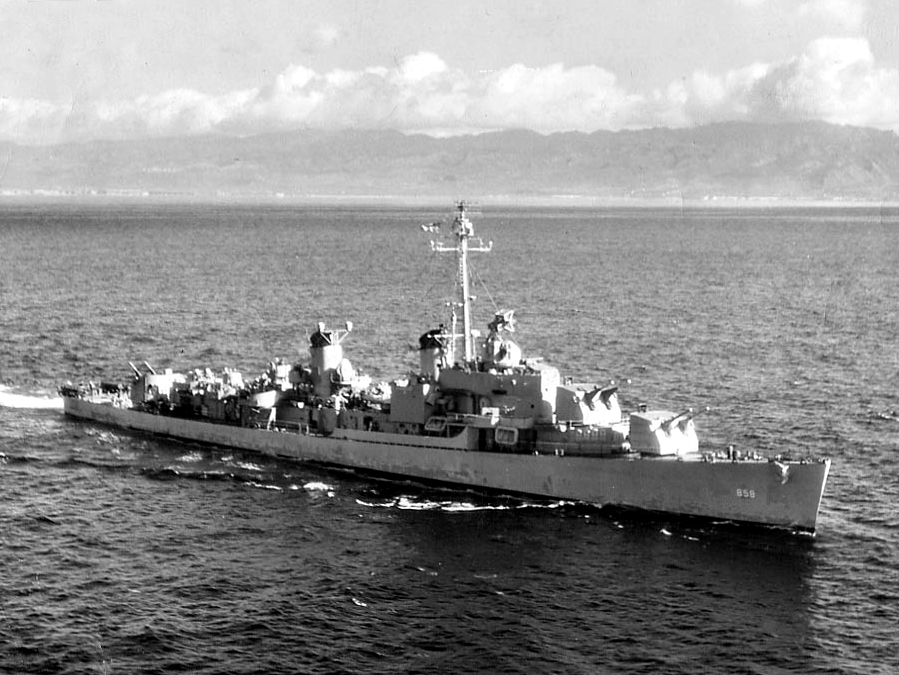
- USS Fred T. Berry underway on 15 February 1947

History

United States
- Name: USS Fred T. Berry
- Namesake: Fred T. Berry
- Builder: Bethlehem Shipbuilding, San Pedro, Los Angeles
- Laid down: 16 July 1944
- Launched: 28 January 1945
- Commissioned: 12 May 1945
- Decommissioned: September 1970
- Reclassified: DDE-858, 4 March 1950
- Stricken: 15 September 1970
- Identification: Callsign: NFTB; Hull number: DD-858
- Honors and awards: 2 battle stars (Korea)
- Fate: Scuttled as an artificial reef, 14 May 1972

General characteristics
- Class & type: Gearing-class destroyer
- Displacement: 3,460 long tons (3,516 t) full
- Length: 390 ft 6 in (119.02 m)
- Beam: 40 ft 10 in (12.45 m)
- Draft: 14 ft 4 in (4.37 m)
- Propulsion: Geared turbines, 2 shafts, 60,000 shp (45 MW)
- Speed: 35 knots (65 km/h; 40 mph)
- Range: 4,500 nmi (8,300 km) at 20 kn (37 km/h; 23 mph)
- Complement: 336
- Armament: 6 × 5"/38 caliber guns; 12 × 40 mm AA guns; 11 × 20 mm AA guns; 10 × 21 inch (533 mm) torpedo tubes; 6 × depth charge projectors; 2 × depth charge tracks

USS Fred T. Berry (DD/DDE-858) was a Gearing-class destroyer of the United States Navy.

== Namesake ==
Fred Thomas Berry was born 23 November 1887 in Logan, Iowa. He was a member of the United States Naval Academy class of 1908. Through much of his early career he specialized in engineering duty. During World War I commanded USS McCall and was awarded the Navy Cross. In 1927, he began training in dirigibles, and later commanded the airship Los Angeles (ZR-3). Commander Berry, then commanding Naval Air Station Lakehurst, was lost in the crash of Akron (ZRS-4) off the New Jersey coast 4 April 1933.

== Construction and commissioning ==
Fred T. Berry was launched on 28 January 1945 by Bethlehem Shipbuilding, San Pedro, Los Angeles; sponsored by Mrs. Fred T. Berry, widow of Commander Berry; and commissioned on 12 May 1945.

== Service history ==
Sailing from San Francisco, California on 29 August 1945, Fred T. Berry trained with aircraft carriers in Hawaiian waters and completed a tour of occupation duty in the Far East before returning to her home port, San Diego, on 21 February 1947. A second Far Eastern cruise, between 2 December and 7 August 1948, preceded a modernization overhaul in 1949, during which her anti-submarine warfare capabilities were augmented.

Fred T. Berry left San Diego on 25 August 1949 for her new home port, Newport, Rhode Island, arriving on 11 September. The Atlantic Fleet exercise schedule took her from Greenland to Guantanamo Bay, Cuba, in the ten months that followed. Fred T. Berry was reclassified an Escort Destroyer, DDE-858, on 4 March 1950. Alerted for temporary duty in the Mediterranean at the opening of the Korean War, Fred T. Berry sailed from Newport on 5 July 1950, and at the end of the summer, sailed on through the Suez Canal to join the 7th Fleet in the Far East. She screened fast carriers launching strikes on targets in North Korea, and escorted battleship Missouri (BB-63) to her bombardment duty at Hŭngnam during the withdrawal from that port. Detached from Task Force 77 (TF 77) on 5 February 1951, Fred T. Berry sailed eastward to complete her circumnavigation of the world with her return to Newport on 14 March 1951.

During each of the next three years, and again in 1957 and 1960, Fred T. Berry served tours of duty with the 6th Fleet in the Mediterranean, joining in exercises, patrolling this key area, and paying good will visits to many ports. NATO "Operation Mainbrace" took her to British ports in 1952, and during the 1956 midshipman training cruise, she called at Barcelona, Spain, and Greenock, Scotland.

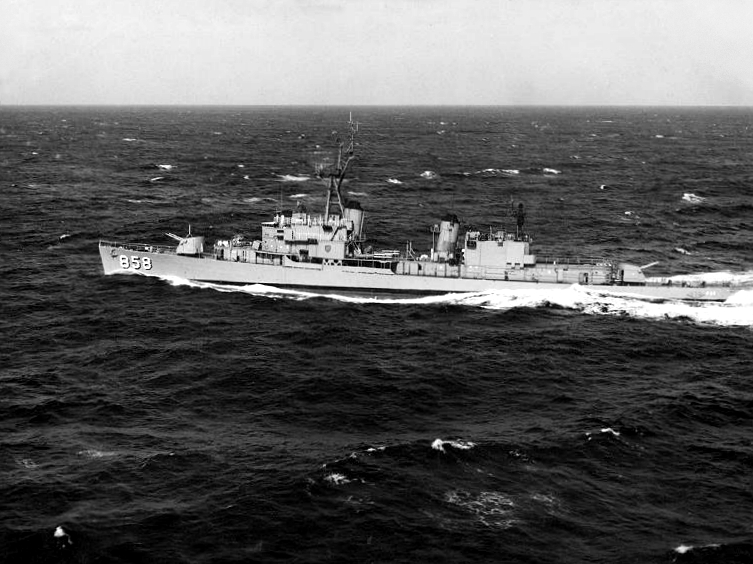
Fred T. Berry in February 1966.

With her primary employment anti-submarine warfare development from 1954 through 1963, Fred T. Berry sailed the western Atlantic from Canadian ports to Argentina, operating with experimental hunter-killer groups.

Fred T. Berry sailed from Newport in January 1966 with DESRON 12 for the Pacific via the Panama Canal. She earned two campaign stars and the Combat Action Ribbon for Vietnam service. Returning to Newport via the Suez Canal Fred T. Berry completed her round the world cruise in August 1966.

On 15 September 1970, Fred T. Berry was stricken from the Naval Vessel Register.

== Disposal ==
On 14 May 1972, Fred T. Berry was scuttled at 24°27.8′N 81°33.3′W, in 55 fathoms (330 feet; 100 m) of water to form an artificial reef off Key West, Florida.

On 17 June 1973, the research submersible Johnson Sea Link became entangled in her wreckage, resulting in the deaths of two of her four occupants before Johnson Sea Link was freed and reached the surface the following day.

== Awards ==
Fred T. Berry received two battle stars for Korean War service.
