= Johnson Sea Link accident =

Manned submersible incident in Florida

Coordinates: 24.4734°N 81.5589°W

- Date: June 17, 1973
- Location: Off Key West
- Cause: Entangled submersible
- Participants: Archibald Menzies, Robert Meek, Edwin Clayton Link, Albert Dennison Stover
- Outcome: Successful rescue of Menzies and Meek; recovery of bodies of Link and Stover

In June 1973, during a seemingly routine dive off Key West, the submersible Johnson Sea Link was trapped for over 24 hours in the wreckage of the destroyer USS Fred T. Berry, which had been sunk to create an artificial reef. Although the submersible was eventually recovered by the rescue vessel A.B. Wood II, two of the four occupants died of carbon dioxide poisoning: 31-year-old Edwin Clayton Link (son of Edwin Albert Link, the submersible's designer) and 51-year-old diver Albert Dennison Stover. The submersible's pilot, Archibald "Jock" Menzies, and ichthyologist Robert Meek survived. Over the next two years, Edwin Link designed an unmanned Cabled Observation and Rescue Device (CORD) that could free a trapped submersible.

== Background ==
The Johnson Sea Link was the successor to Edwin Link's previous submersible, Deep Diver, the first small submersible designed for lockout diving. In 1968 the Bureau of Ships determined that Deep Diver was unsafe for use at great depths or in extremely cold temperatures because of the substitution of the wrong kind of steel, which became brittle in cold water, in some parts of the submersible. Link proceeded to design a new lockout submersible with a distinctive acrylic bubble as the forward pilot/observer compartment. In January 1971 the new submersible was launched and commissioned to the Smithsonian Institution. It was named the Johnson Sea Link after its donors, Link and his friend John Seward Johnson I.

The Johnson Sea Link carried a crew of four in two separate compartments. The aft compartment was designed for lockout diving, allowing two divers to be compressed to the ambient pressure of the ocean and leave the submersible to work underwater. The forward pilot's compartment was an acrylic sphere with a diameter of 5 feet (1.5 m), providing a panoramic underwater view for the pilot and an observer. An air conditioning unit was installed on the aft starboard side of the acrylic sphere, creating a blind spot for the pilot.

== The accident ==
After two years of successful operations, on June 17, 1973, the Johnson Sea Link was launched from Edwin Link's research ship, the Sea Diver, fifteen miles (24 km) out from Key West, Florida. The objective of the mission was to recover a fish trap from the destroyer USS Fred T. Berry, which had been sunk to create an artificial reef. This was Dive 130 of the Johnson Sea Link. The Sea Link crew that day consisted of:

- Pilot Archibald "Jock" Menzies, 30 (had previously piloted the Sea Link about 100 times)
- Robert P. Meek, 27, ichthyologist and pressure physiologist (observer in forward compartment)
- Edwin Clayton Link (known as Clayton Link), 31, Smithsonian Institution director of diving, son of Edwin Albert Link (observer in rear compartment)
- Albert Dennison "Smoky" Stover, 51, submersible pilot (observer in rear compartment)

According to the subsequent United States Coast Guard report on the accident, Menzies, Link, and Stover "displayed an incredible casualness in their preparations for Dive 130, considering the inherent hazards of their operation." Because Link and Stover were not planning to perform a lockout dive, they were dressed in shorts and T-shirts. Prior to entering the submersible, Meek noticed Link and Stover's clothing and commented to them that it was cold "down there".

The attempt to retrieve the fish trap failed. Shortly after 9:45 a.m., the Sea Link became entangled on a cable in the Fred T. Berry's wreckage while moving away from the sunken ship, 360 feet (110 m) below the ocean surface. The Sea Diver informed the U.S. Coast Guard of the situation and requested the assistance of Navy divers, but conveyed that the Sea Link was in "no immediate danger". The Navy dispatched the submarine rescue ship USS Tringa (ASR-16) from Key West.

== Rescue attempts ==
The Sea Link and Sea Diver crews considered whether to use the submersible's lockout capacity to allow one of the men in the diving compartment to exit the submersible and attempt to free it from the cable. This plan was abandoned because it posed a danger of oxygen toxicity to Link and Stover in the diving chamber. The Sea Link crew and Edwin Link, who was in overall charge of the situation, agreed to await the Tringa's arrival. Levels of carbon dioxide (CO_{2}) began to rise in the pilot compartment when the CO_{2} scrubber failed. Menzies took off his shirt, emptied the carbon dioxide absorbent baralyme from the scrubber canister into it and held it in front of the circulating fans of the air conditioning unit, lowering the CO_{2} level in the pilot's cabin. The Sea Diver crew calculated that the CO_{2} in the submersible could be maintained at acceptable levels for 42 hours in the pilot compartment and 61 hours in the diver compartment. These calculations, however, did not take into account that the baralyme in the diver compartment would be rendered less effective by low temperatures. The acrylic plastic hull of the pilot compartment had a lower heat transfer coefficient than the aluminum hull of the diver compartment, allowing it to remain at a higher temperature.

The Tringa arrived on scene at about 4:15 p.m. and proceeded to make a four-point moor above the Sea Link. By the evening of June 17 the internal temperature of the aluminum diver compartment had dropped to near the temperature of the surrounding ocean, and was possibly as low as 45 °F (7 °C). By 10 p.m., the absorbent capability of the diver compartment baralyme was exhausted. At 10:25 p.m., Link and Stover began breathing from air-supplied masks. Two hard hat divers from the Tringa attempted to descend to the Sea Link, but had to turn back when their progress was impeded by the hull of the Berry. A lockout dive by Link and Stover was considered, but they again expressed their desire not to lock out; Menzies and the Sea Diver crew agreed. A lockout dive was considered again at 12:38 a.m. on June 18, but by this time Link and Stover were too cold to attempt such a dive. They had switched over to a helium-oxygen breathing mixture, resulting in rapid body heat loss. The atmospheric pressure in the diver's compartment had by now increased to the ambient pressure of the ocean at the Sea Link's depth (approximately 12 standard atmospheres (1,200 kPa)).

At 1:12 a.m., Menzies reported to the surface that Link and Stover were suffering convulsions. There was no further audio communication with Link and Stover after this point. A second rescue dive from the Tringa was again unsuccessful, as was the attempted use of a Roving Diving Bell lowered from the Tringa later that morning. The submersible Perry Cubmarine attempted to search the bottom, but was hampered by an inoperative sonar.

On the afternoon of June 18, the commercial salvage vessel A.B. Wood II (O.N. 501922) arrived on the scene carrying an underwater television camera with a maneuverable platform, a device from the Naval Ordnance Laboratory in Fort Lauderdale, Florida. After the camera was used to locate the Sea Link, a grappling hook was attached to the camera and used to engage one of the Sea Link's propeller shrouds and bring it to the surface. The Sea Link surfaced at 4:53 p.m. on June 18.

Menzies and Meek could immediately be removed from the Sea Link and were transferred to the decompression chamber aboard the Tringa. However, with the diver's compartment still pressurized, any attempt to remove Link and Stover would have been fatal to them if they were still alive. The Sea Link was transferred aboard the Sea Diver. Link and Stover were visible through the diving compartment's view ports, but showed no vital signs. The compartment was force ventilated with a helium-oxygen mixture while remaining pressurized, and hot water was sprayed over it in an attempt to raise its internal temperature. On the morning of June 19, medical doctors concluded that Link and Stover were dead, and the compartment was depressurized. Link and Stover were brought to the Florida Keys Memorial Hospital on Key West, where their autopsies were performed. Both men's cause of death was listed as "Respiratory Acidosis due to Carbon Dioxide Poisoning".

== Aftermath ==
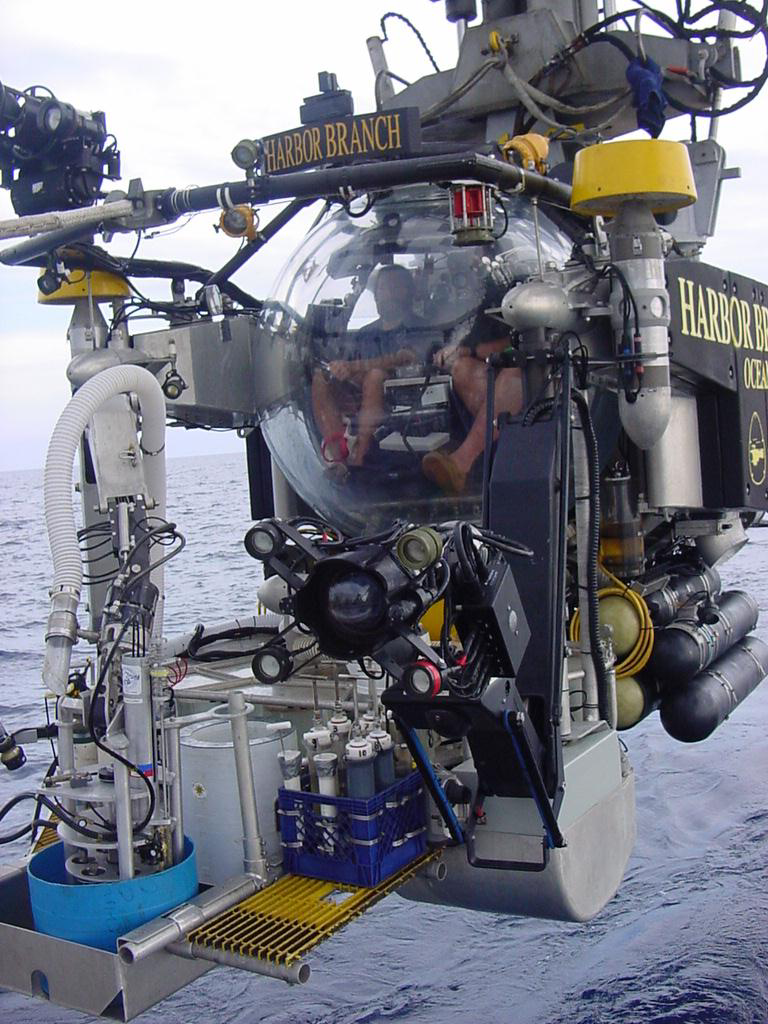
One of the Johnson Sea Link submersibles, c. 2005

The Johnson Sea Link accident was investigated by the United States Coast Guard. The investigators concluded that the accident was caused by pilot error, possibly due to distraction, and by the hull shape of the Sea Link. According to the investigators, "The submersible's modular construction of irregular shapes, projections, and appendages provide an excellent configuration for ensnarement by almost any type of obstruction."

In addition to the U.S. Coast Guard investigation, the Smithsonian Institution commissioned an in-house investigation, review and report. That report, titled "Report of the Johnson-Sea-Link Expert Review Panel to The Secretary, Smithsonian Institution, December 21, 1973", totaling 121 pages, provided specific observations and recommendations for changes in the design and operation of the submersible. That report was never issued to the public.

Basic conclusions from the internal investigation were (paraphrased):

a. A combination of key engineering and operational decisions contributed to the entrapment and loss of life.

b. The developmental craft is a basically sound and safe system not yet fully developed (as of 1973) and completion and correct observation of the craft can be done safely.

c. Menzies and Meek performed admirably, as did the rescue team, and circumstances beyond their control led to the loss of life.

Edwin Link spent the following two years designing an unmanned Cabled Observation and Rescue Device (CORD) that could free a trapped submersible. A second Johnson Sea Link submersible, nearly identical to the first, was launched in 1975. The two submersibles remained in operation for many years, examining the wreck of the USS Monitor in 1977 and helping recover the wreckage of the Space Shuttle Challenger after its destruction in 1986, but were retired in 2011. The 1974 television movie Trapped Beneath the Sea, starring Lee J. Cobb, was loosely based on the Johnson Sea Link accident.

The Link Foundation established the Albert D. Stover/E. Clayton Link Fund, used to support scholarships and oceanographic research, in 1973. In 1978, Compass Publications established the National Ocean Industries Association Safety in Seas Award, partly in memory of Link and Stover.
