= Joshua Bryant =

American actor, director and author (1940–2024)

- Born: Joseph Bryant; July 2, 1940; Norfolk, Virginia, U.S.
- Died: June 25, 2024 (aged 83); Maisonnais-sur-Tardoire, France
- Other name: Josh Bryant
- Occupations: Actor, director, author, speaker
- Years active: 1968–2024
- Spouse: Melinda Mullins (m. 2005)

Joshua Bryant (born Joseph Bryant; July 2, 1940 – June 25, 2024) was an American actor, director, author, and speaker who was the founder of the Taos Talking Pictures Film Festival in Taos, New Mexico.

== Early life and education ==
Bryant was born in Norfolk, Virginia. After attending the Pasadena Playhouse College of Theater Arts and the Royal Academy of Dramatic Art in London and serving for three years in the Signal Corps, he began a career in the theater that eventually led to his guest-starring in several television shows.

== Career ==
Bryant's movie credits have included acting roles in films and television movies, such as The Curious Female (1970), Black Noon (1971), Enter the Devil (1972), A Scream in the Streets (1973), The Morning After (1974), Trapped Beneath the Sea (1974), Framed (1975), The Night That Panicked America (1975), Maneaters Are Loose! (1978), Salem's Lot (1979), First Monday in October (1981), Gone Are the Dayes (1984), The Education of Allison Tate (1986), and Project Eliminator (1991) He was also active in television, including guest roles on Columbo, Kojak, Little House on the Prairie, M*A*S*H (three episodes), The Rockford Files (four episodes), The Mary Tyler Moore Show and Barnaby Jones (four episodes).

For four years, Bryant hosted the syndicated series, Game Warden Wildlife Journal.

== Personal life and death ==
In June 2018, Bryant told Le Populaire du Centre newspaper that he had decided to leave the United States with his wife, Melinda Mullins, if the Bush administration invaded Iraq. In response to the 2003 invasion of Iraq, Bryant and his wife organized or sold all their property and relocated to the Limousin region of France.

Bryant died in Maisonnais-sur-Tardoire, France on June 25, 2024, at the age of 83. He was survived by his wife, Melinda Mullins.

== Filmography ==
=== Film ===
Year	Title	Role	Notes
1970	The Curious Female	Dr. Tower	
1972	Enter the Devil	Glenn	
1973	A Scream in the Streets	Officer Ed Haskell	
1975	Framed	Andrew Ney	
1981	First Monday in October	Bill Russell	
1986	The Education of Allison Tate	Richard Tate	
1991	Project Eliminator	Dr. Markson	

=== Television ===
Year	Title	Role	Notes
1968	Cimarron Strip	Lieutenant	Episode: "Fool's Gold"
1968	The Outcasts	Lieutenant	Episode: "The Night Riders"
1969	Gunsmoke	Young	Episode: "Twisted Heritage"
1970	Here Come the Brides	Eben	Episode: "The Last Winter"
1970	Dan August	Lester Mzarek	Episode: "In the Eyes of God"
1970	Mission: Impossible	Stefan	Episode: "Decoy"
1970, 1974	Mannix	Ed Pryor / Paul Russell	2 episodes
1971	The Bill Cosby Show	Mr. Thomas	Episode: "The Barber Shop"
1971	Black Noon	Towhead	Television film
1971	Night Gallery	Eliot Blackman	Episode: "Pickman's Model"
1971	Monty Nash	Brother Zachary	Episode: "Brother Zachary"
1971–1973	Ironside	Various roles	3 episodes
1971–1976	Cannon	Various roles	3 episodes
1972	The Mary Tyler Moore Show	Anton Styrokowski (Sandy)	Episode: "Baby Sit-Com"
1972	Love, American Style	Harold / Lester	Episode: "Love and the Sensuous Twin"
1972	Search	Air Reservationist	Episode: "Moonrock"
1972	Emergency!	Mr. Bodine	Episode: "Women"
1973	Ghost Story	The Doctor	Episode: "Death's Head"
1973	The F.B.I.	Carney	Episode: "Memory of a Legend"
1973	Me	Rick	Television film
1973	Roll Out	Sgt. Briggs	Episode: "No Wages: All Fear"
1974	The Morning After	Dr. Emmett	Television film
1974	Kojak	Simon Hecht	Episode: "The Only Way Out"
1974	The Streets of San Francisco	Dr. Benjamin Blakely	Episode: "I Ain't Marchin' Anymore"
1974	Trapped Beneath the Sea	Sam Wallants	Television film
1974, 1976	Columbo	Wayne Taylor / Dr. MacMurray	2 episodes
1974–1979	The Rockford Files	Various roles	4 episodes
1974–1980	Barnaby Jones	Various roles	4 episodes
1975	The Night That Panicked America	Howard Koch	Television film
1975	Matt Helm	Bub Stuart	Episode: "Murder on the Run"
1976	Petrocelli	Paul Andrews	Episode: "Any Number Can Die"
1976	City of Angels	Duncan	Episode: "The Parting Shot"
1976	Spencer's Pilots	Bill Kelly	Episode: "The Crop Duster"
1976	The Blue Knight	Sgt. Rainey	2 episodes
1976, 1981	Insight	Jim / Walter	2 episodes
1977	Switch	Stafford Hayes	Episode: "The Snitch"
1977	Man from Atlantis	Dr. Doug Berkley	Episode: "Man from Atlantis"
1977	Starsky & Hutch	Jerry Tabor	Episode: "Long Walk Down a Short Dirt Road"
1977	Future Cop	Andrew	Episode: "The Kansas City Kid"
1977	The Feather and Father Gang	Washington	Episode: "The Judas Bug"
1977	Rafferty	Robert Cardler	Episode: "The Epidemic"
1977	Visions	Dr. Rosen	Episode: "The Dancing Bear"
1977	The Love Boat	Jack Plymouth	Episode: "Lost and Found/The Understudy/Married Singles"
1977	Hunter	Pohlman	Episode: "U.F.M. 13"
1977, 1978	Little House on the Prairie	Adam Simms	2 episodes
1978	Hawaii Five-O	Joe Boyd	Episode: "When Does a War End?"
1978	Killing Stone	Harold Rizzi	Television film
1978	Maneaters Are Loose!	Tom Purcell	Television film
1978	Dallas	Peter Larson	Episode: "Election"
1978, 1980	CHiPs	Arthur Holmes / Benson	2 episodes
1979	Married: The First Year	Michael Huffman	Episode: "The Married Machine"
1979	Salem's Lot	Ted Petrie	2 episodes
1979	M*A*S*H	Jack Scully	3 episodes
1979, 1984	Hart to Hart	Dan Wilmott / Paul Villon	2 episodes
1981	Eight Is Enough	Walt Liebowitz	Episode: "Goals"
1981	Behind the Screen	Gerry Holmby	Episode: "Pilot"
1982	Bret Maverick	Busted Bill Sharples	Episode: "Dateline: Sweetwater"
1982	Knots Landing	Larry Wilson	2 episodes
1982	The Fall Guy	Director	Episode: "Three for the Road"
1982	To Climb a Mountain	John Novak	Television film
1982	Magnum, P.I.	Keeler	Episode: "Foiled Again"
1982	Wait Until Dark	Mike Talman	Television film
1983	The Powers of Matthew Star	Martin Ragland	Episode: "36 Hours"
1983	Secrets of a Mother and Daughter	Barry	Television film
1983	The A-Team	Jim Baker	Episode: "The White Ballot"
1984	Riptide	Dr. Robert Atkins	Episode: "The Hardcase"
1984	Gone Are the Dayes	Fred Cooper	Television film
1985	Crazy Like a Fox	Colonel Glendon	Episode: "The Geronimo Machine"
1985	Wildside	Pike	Episode: "Delinquency of a Miner"
1986	St. Elsewhere	Dr. Bond Stevens	Episode: "Out on a Limb"
1986	News at Eleven	Martin Kent	Television film
1986	The Deliberate Stranger	Prosecutor	Miniseries
1986	Matlock	Dave Edwards	Episode: "The Seduction"
1986	The Magical World of Disney	Sam the Vet	Episode: "The Thanksgiving Promise"
1987	Starman	Wayne Geffner	2 episodes
1987	J.J. Starbuck	Billy	Episode: "First You've Got to Go to the Picnic"
1987	The Law & Harry McGraw	Metzger	Episode: "Yankee Boodle Dandy"
1989	Highway to Heaven	Caz	Episode: "Summer Camp"
1989	L.A. Law	Dr. Gregory Stark	Episode: "Lie Down and Deliver"
1992	Lucky Luke	Mr. Farley	Episode: "Chi è Mr. Josephs?"
2001	Touched by an Angel	Harry	Episode: "Thief of Hearts"
2005	Into the West	Gen. Wm. Sherman	Episode: "Hell on Wheels"
2006	The Lost Room	Art O'Dougherty	Episode: "The Comb and the Box"
2008	Wildfire	Dr. Ronald	2 episodes
