= The Sinful Dwarf =

- Directed by: Vidal Raski
- Written by: Harlan Asquith
- Produced by: Nicolas Poole
- Starring: Torben Bille; Clara Kelle
- Music by: Ole Ørsted
- Distributed by: Boxoffice International Pictures
- Release date: 1973
- Running time: 92 minutes
- Country: Denmark
- Language: English

The Sinful Dwarf (original title: Dværgen) is a 1973 Danish sexploitation-horror film by Vidal Raski. The screenplay concerns Olaf, who turns women into junkie-prostitutes.

== Synopsis ==
Olaf (Torben Bille) tricks young women and brings them to the home he shares with his drunken mother (Clara Kelle). Once the unlucky ladies arrive, they are drugged, imprisoned, tied up, and then turned into junkie-prostitutes in the secret brothel that Olaf manages together with his mother.

== Release ==
The film was released on special edition DVD by Severin Films in 2009. It exists in both unrated US theatrical re-release version The Abducted Bride and Danish hardcore version The Dwarf.

When first released, the film was banned in neighbouring Sweden and West Germany, both known at the time for their liberal approach to film-making and film ratings.
