= Carl Monson =

- Born: Carl J. Williams; September 2, 1932; Los Angeles
- Died: August 4, 1988 (aged 55)

Carl Monson (September 2, 1932 – August 4, 1988) a.k.a. Carlos Monsoya, Charles Monsoya, was at the forefront of independent low budget exploitation and sexploitation films or paracinema during the 1970s and 1980s. He is most well known for Blood Legacy (1971), Booby Trap (1973) and Death Feud (1986).

== Career ==
Monson got his start at the prestigious Pasadena Playhouse’s school of theatre, known as the Hollywood “Star Factory.” In 1964, with his first wife Laura Shelton, he founded the Curtain Call Theater in North Hollywood, a critically acclaimed invitational playhouse run by professional actors on a cooperative basis. The Curtain Call Theater was one of the first legitimate theatres to open in the NoHo Arts District which is now considered Hollywood's theatre district.

In addition to working in theatre, Monson also directed and wrote screenplays for low-budget exploitation films during the 1970s and 1980s. He is most well known for Blood Legacy (1971), A Scream in the Streets (1973) and Savage Harbor (1987). He also founded and worked out of Bumblebee Productions with his second wife, Tricia Kross. He worked out of Bumblebee Productions until his death from heart failure August 4, 1988.

== Selected filmography ==
Death Feud

- a.k.a. Savage Harbor (1986), Screenwriter/Actor: Harold/Director/Producer

A Scream in the Streets

- (1973), Director/Producer

Booby Trap

- a.k.a. 10 Seconds to Murder (1973), Actor:Jack Brennan/Assoc. Producer

The Takers

- (1972), as Carlos Monsoya, Actor: Laura's Husband/Director

Please Don't Eat My Mother

- (1972), Actor: Officer O'Columbus/Director/Producer

Blood Legacy

- a.k.a. Legacy of Blood (1971), Screenwriter/Director/Producer

The Acid Eaters

- a.k.a. The Acid People (1968), Screenwriter

== Personal life ==
Monson's first wife was Laura Shelton (1935-2008) a.k.a. Carol Monson (born Carol Jean Ready on September 5, 1935 in Eastland, Texas). She was a frequent guest star on several popular 1960s television series including Wagon Train, Harrigan and Son, The Detectives starring Robert Taylor, The Beverly Hillbillies, My Favorite Martian, Have Gun, Will Travel and Death Valley Days. Carl and Laura had two children; Clay Monson (who makes a cameo appearance in Death Feud) and Cristen Monson Susong (a Broadway performer). Shelton and Monson divorced in 1973.

Carl Monson later married Tricia Kross (ex-wife of Three Dog Night keyboard player, Jimmy Greenspoon). His second marriage produced no children, but Kross and Monson did create Bumblebee Productions.
