= Jason Kartalian =

American film director

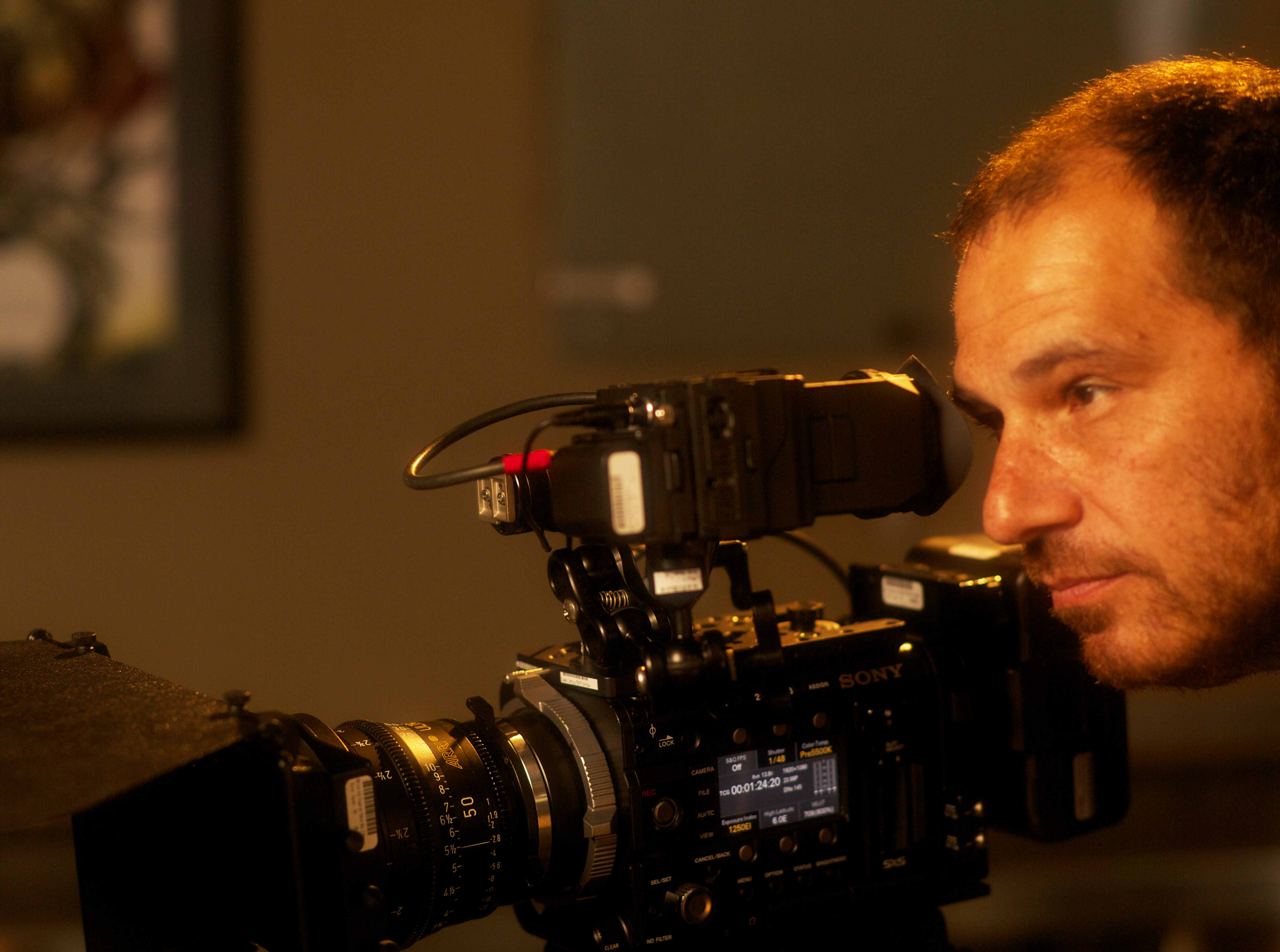
- Director Jason Kartalian shooting with Sony F55 digital camera.
- Citizenship: United States
- Education: California State University Northridge
- Occupations: Film producer, director and writer

Jason Kartalian is an American film producer, director and writer. He was born and raised in the San Fernando Valley, his mother was a jewelry craftsperson and his father was the actor Buck Kartalian.

== Career ==
Jason graduated from the film program at California State University Northridge. His first feature Pedestrian, was selected to show at numerous film festivals and won the best picture and best screenplay award at the AFMA Film Festival and the Best Screenplay Award at the Long Island Film Expo. His horror feature Driller, was selected to the Another Hole in the Head Film Festival.

Kartalian wrote, and directed the feature film Seahorses. The film has had a very successful festival run, garnering many awards and was screened in numerous US and international film festivals.

Seahorses won Best of fest at the Socal International Film Festival, Best Micro Budget Film at the Toronto Indie Film Festival, Best Narrative Feature at the Seattle Transmedia and Independent Film Festival, Starlight Film Festival, Board of Directors Award at the Starlite Film Festival and Viewers Choice Award at the Cleveland Indiegathering.

Seahorses has also won Best Screenplay at LA Indie Film festival, BEST ACTOR at Socal Film Festival, Best Actress & Best Actor awards at LA Indie and Cinematography at Socal International Film Festival.

Seahorses official selections include the Big Island Film Festival, Dances With Films, Firstglance Film Festival, Cleveland Indiegathering, SoCal International Film Festival, LA Indie Film Festival, Hollywood Reel Independent Film Festival, Seattle Transmedia and Independent Film Festival, Toronto Indie Film Festival, and the Sydney Indie Film Festival.

Kartalian is also a vegan podcaster and social media influencer through his page Vegan Hacks Pod

== Filmography ==
- Pedestrian (2000)
- Driller (2006)
- Seahorses (2014)
- Noirland (2014)
