= Sassy Sue =

- Directed by: Bethel Buckalew
- Starring: John Tull; Colleen Brennan; Patrick Wright; Tallie Cochrane; Dottie Lou; Harvey Shain; Rachel Wolfe
- Music by: Harold Hensley; Hal Southern
- Release date: 1973
- Running time: 84 min.
- Country: United States
- Language: English

Sassy Sue is a 1973 American comedy film directed by Bethel Buckalew and produced by Harry H. Novak. The film's music was composed by Harold Hensley and Hal Southern.

== Cast ==
- John Tull as Junior
- Colleen Brennan as Dolly Lee
- Patrick Wright as Pa
- Tallie Cochrane as Dottie Lou
- Harvey Shain as Hutch
- Rachel Wolfe as Ma
