= Axe (film) =

1977 American horror film written and directed by Frederick R. Friedel

- Theatrical release poster
- Directed by: Frederick R. Friedel
- Written by: Frederick R. Friedel
- Produced by: J.G. Patterson Jr.
- Starring: Leslie Lee; Hart Smith; Carol Miller
- Cinematography: Austin McKinney
- Edited by: Frederick R. Friedel; J.G. Patterson Jr.
- Music by: George Newman Shaw; John Willhelm
- Production companies: Frederick Productions; Empire Studios
- Distributed by: Boxoffice International Pictures (BIP)
- Release dates: December 9, 1974 (Greenville, South Carolina)
- Running time: 67 minutes
- Country: United States
- Language: English
- Budget: $25,000

Axe is a 1974 American independent horror film written and directed by Frederick R. Friedel and starring Leslie Lee. Its plot follows a trio of criminals who lodge at a rural farmhouse where a teenage girl resides with her disabled grandfather. After one of the men attempts to rape her, she enacts revenge.

Originally titled Lisa, Lisa, the film is one of the famous "video nasties" that was banned in the United Kingdom in the early 1980s.

== Plot ==
Three mobsters—Steele, Lomax, and Billy—enter a hotel room and await Aubrey, a local man who owes them money. Aubrey arrives with his male lover shortly after, and Lomax shoves a burning cigar down his throat before beating him to death. Aubrey's lover leaps to his death from the 12th-floor window.

Afterward, Steele, Lomax, and Billy drive through the countryside. Billy is remorseful for their crime, while Steele and Lomax are indifferent. Steele and Lomax relentlessly terrorize a female clerk, tearing off her blouse before firing a gun above her head, which breaks a ketchup bottle on her during a stop at a grocery store.

The next day, the men seek lodging at a remote farmhouse where an impassive young woman, Lisa, lives a solitary existence with her disabled grandfather. She is notably evasive toward the men but agrees to let them spend the night when they claim Billy has fallen ill. When the police arrive searching for the men, Lomax and Steele threaten Lisa with a gun, and she wards the officers away, assuring them she has not seen the criminals. At dinner, Lisa serves the men a chicken she slaughtered that morning. While the men eat, Lisa attempts to cut herself in the upstairs bathroom but is interrupted by Billy, who knocks on the door.

Lomax attempts to rape Lisa while she sleeps, but she stops the assault by slashing his neck with a straight razor, killing him. She drags his body to the bathtub, dismembers it with a hatchet, and stuffs the body parts into a steamer trunk. The following morning, Billy helps her carry the trunk into the attic, unaware of its contents. When he discovers blood dripping out of it, he opens the lid to find Lomax's body inside. Lisa lies and claims that Steele killed him.

Billy and Lisa go into the woods to talk about the incident away from Steele. She calmly unveils a straight razor, but Billy takes it from her hand, presuming she passed it over to him to arm himself against Steele. Upon returning to the house, Lisa makes Steele a sandwich in the kitchen. He comments on her physical beauty, to which she does not respond, which enrages him. Steele drags Lisa upstairs to the parlor, where her grandfather is watching television, and the two of them scuffle. She manages to grab a hatchet near the fireplace and kills him with it.

When Billy returns, he finds Steele missing; Lisa claims he was gone when she returned. Lisa prepares tomato soup for Billy and her grandfather in the upstairs parlor. While eating the soup, Billy finds Steele's ring inside his bowl and watches in horror as Steele's body dislodges from the chimney flue and tumbles out of the fireplace. Lisa pays no attention and quietly hums as she feeds her grandfather. Billy flees in horror and runs outside, where he is shot to death by the police.

== Cast ==
- Leslie Lee as Lisa
- Jack Canon as Steele
- Ray Green as Lomax
- Frederick R. Friedel as Billy
- Douglas Powers as Grandfather
- Frank Jones as Aubrey
- Carol Miller as Storewoman
- George J. Monaghan as Harold
- Hart Smith as Detective
- Scott Smith as Policeman

== Production ==
=== Inspiration ===
Writer-director Frederick R. Friedel had aspired to make a feature film by age 25, an aspiration fueled by Orson Welles's having directed Citizen Kane (1941) at that age. "I had no pretensions that I was directing Citizen Kane," Friedel recalled, but he had long wanted to make a film, and had been living in Los Angeles trying to break into the film business. Friedel pitched his idea for a horror film to producer J.G. Patterson; at the time, Friedel was entirely inexperienced, having never been on a film set, never cast a film, nor worked in a film production. He credited Paterson as "setting everything in motion" in terms of getting the production started.

=== Filming ===
Axe was shot over a period of nine days in the winter of 1974. It was shot on 35 mm film stock, largely consisting of short-end film that had been returned to the Kodak distributor, which was cheaper than new rolls of film.

Principal photography took place on location in a farmhouse outside Charlotte, North Carolina on a budget of US$25,000. The production paid a total of $25 to shoot in the house for around three days, and much of the decorations and dressings inside were already present. The Charlotte area was chosen by Friedel due to the low productions costs; J.G. Patterson, the film's producer had used the area for past films he had produced because of this. The film's opening sequence was shot on location at the Hotel Charlotte.

=== Casting ===
Ray Green portrayed Lomax, the leader of the gang, while Jack Cannon portrayed Steele, one of Lomax's henchmen. Director Friedel cast himself in the role of Billy, the guilt-ridden third member of the gang, primarily to help alleviate the production cost of hiring another actor. Frank Jones, who appears as Aubrey, was in fact a local regional film distributor. Carol Miller appears as the storewoman who is terrorized by the gang, and was cast because Friedel felt she possessed a natural shyness.

Leslie Lee, who portrayed the withdrawn teenage Lisa, was actually 23 years old at the time of filming. According to Friedel, Lee had claimed to have done modeling prior to auditioning for the role, and he felt she embodied "a lot of the feeling" he envisioned for the character. "The key sometimes is just casting people who embody the character, and not somebody who has to act it—and I think, walking into the room, she really was Lisa." A myth circulated that Lee died after the production, which was false; according to Friedel, as of 2015, Lee was alive and operated a diving boat in Cabo San Lucas, Mexico, with her husband. As Lisa's grandfather, Douglas Powers was cast by Friedel due to his "evocative" face, as his character's facial expressions would serve as his only form of communication.

=== Post-production ===
Friedel recalled that the production sought to extend individual scenes "by any means possible" to give the film a longer running time, which included the extended opening and closing credits sequences. Some dubbing was completed in post-production, particularly for the scenes in the car, as the crew had no means of capturing sound in a moving vehicle.

== Release ==
=== Theatrical distribution ===
Axe was originally released under the title Lisa, Lisa, under which it screened in Greenville, South Carolina, beginning December 9, 1974. It was re-released four years later in January 1978 under the title Axe, premiering in Los Angeles. Friedel did not favor the title as he felt it lacked the subtlety, "surprise, and irony" of Lisa, Lisa; executive Harry Novak of Boxoffice International Pictures, chose to release the film in 1978 as Axe due to it being a more sensationalistic title.

=== Critical response ===
Linda Gross of the Los Angeles Times praised the film's "angst-ridden" score and cinematography, which she felt "conveys rural isolation and sterility well." However, Gross was critical of the film's featuring a young girl committing violent acts, deeming the film ultimately exploitative and adding that its "slow pace and style emphasize sensationalism and ugliness." Variety deemed the film "a fascinating but totally uncommercial film noir exercise in the horror genre."

Sean Leonard from HorrorNews.net gave the film a mixed review, writing, "I have a hard time coming to an opinion on a film like this. At one point, I certainly won't say it's horrible, as it does have enough good moments to raise it above being classified as a waste of time." Justin Kerswell from Hysteria Lives! awarded the film a negative 1.5 out of 5 stars, calling it "amateurish", and "mind numbingly dull". In his review, Kerswell criticized the film's plot, pacing, and soundtrack.

Frank Lovece of TV Guide gave the film three out of four stars, calling it "a well-photographed, refreshingly naturalistic drama of almost mythic retribution and victimization. [...] The psychological narrative can be slack, and the acting and technical aspects are uneven. But overall, the film makes you wish Friedel had directed more pictures."

=== Home media ===
The film was released on DVD by Image Entertainment on September 25, 2001. In 2006, it was released by ILC Prime on March 27, April 10, and October 9. It was later released by 4Digital Media on October 20, 2008. The film was released for the first time on Blu-ray by Severin on December 15, 2015, as a double-feature alongside Friedel's Kidnapped Coed.

== Works cited ==
- Albright, Brian (2012). Regional Horror Films, 1958–1990: A State-by-State Guide with Interviews. Jefferson, North Carolina: McFarland. ISBN 978-0-786-47227-7.
- Friedel, Frederick J.; Smoot, Philip; Helms, Rick; Keeter, Worth (2015). Axe (Audio commentary). Severin Films.
