= Joe Cabot =

American jazz musician

Joseph Claude Caputo (July 12, 1921 – March 7, 2016), known professionally as Joe Cabot, was an American jazz trumpeter, bandleader, and musical director. His composition "Slow Down, Sugar, Take Your Time" was praised by music critic John Wilson and likened to the stylings of the Nat Cole Trio. In addition to trumpet, Cabot played the flugelhorn.

Cabot was born in Cleveland, Ohio, into a musical family led by his father Joseph and uncle August. His first performances took place locally while he was still a small boy, and by 1939 Cabot was performing as a sideman for drummer Gene Krupa. He also worked with the Dorsey Brothers, Claude Thornhill, and Artie Shaw. Regarding his time with Tommy Dorsey Cabot stated, "When you were with big bands in those days you lived in an iron lung in that bus. But you were part of a family."

Over six decades, Cabot worked with Peggy Lee, Ruth Brown, Chris Connor, Eartha Kitt, Anita O'Day, Fran Warren, Tony Bennett, Dizzy Gillespie, Gerry Mulligan, Oscar Peterson, Stan Getz, and Harry James, Connie Francis, Enzo Stuarti. He maintained a close relationship with James until the latter's death in 1983.

Joe was acclaimed in recording studio work as well, working with Bobby Darin on his first recordings, movie scores and in the 70’s was instrumental in studio recording sessions with new bands, arranging horn sections, Blood, Sweat & Tears, Chicago and the like.

In 1981 Cabot conducted an eight-piece jazz band at Michael's Pub in New York City to accompany singer Fran Warren. At age 70 he took on the role of musical director at Rockefeller Center and for 30 years he performed on television as part of the Cerebral Palsy and Muscular Dystrophy telethons. He died on March 7, 2016, at the age of 94.

== Discography ==
=== As sideman ===
- Late Date with Ruth Brown, Ruth Brown (Atlantic, 1959)
- Witchcraft, Chris Connor (Atlantic, 1959)
- Bop for the People, Charlie Ventura (Proper, 2002)
- Eartha-Quake, Eartha Kitt (1994)
- With a Song in My Heart, Caterina Valente (2000)
