= A Scream in the Streets =

- Directed by: Carl Monson; Dwayne Avery (uncredited); Bethel Buckalew (uncredited); Harry Novak (uncredited)
- Written by: Eric Norden
- Produced by: Carl Monson; Harry Novak
- Starring: Joshua Bryant; Sharon Kelly
- Cinematography: Jack Beckett
- Edited by: Paul Heslin
- Release date: 1973 (United States)
- Running time: 96 minutes
- Country: United States
- Language: English

A Scream in the Streets (Girls in the Streets) is a 1973 crime drama movie by producer Harry H. Novak and director Carl Monson, from a screenplay by Eric Norden. The cast includes Joshua Bryant, Sharon Kelly, Frank Bannon, Linda York and Angela Carnon. The film tells the story of two detectives who try to track down a gruesome murderer-rapist in the Los Angeles area. Their task is made more difficult because the perpetrator is able to impersonate a woman. The film contains a great deal of nudity and explicit sex scenes. It runs for 90 minutes and was released on DVD by Image Entertainment.
