= Venus in Furs (1967 film) =

1967 American film

Venus in Furs is a 1967 sexploitation film directed by Joe Marzano and starring Barbara Ellen. The script was written by Marzano and Ellen, suggested by the novel of the same name by Leopold von Sacher-Masoch.

== Release ==
The film has been released on DVD by Something Weird Video in the US.
