= Buck Kartalian =

American actor (1922–2016)

- Publicity photo of Kartalian
- Born: Vahe Kartalian; August 13, 1922; Detroit, Michigan, U.S.
- Died: May 24, 2016 (aged 93); Mission Hills, California, U.S.
- Occupation: Actor
- Years active: 1953–2006
- Spouse(s): Mary Evonne Bannister (m. 1952; div. 1957) Margaret Poloshjian (m. 1959; died 2015)
- Children: 3

Vahe "Buck" Kartalian (August 13, 1922 – May 24, 2016) was an American character actor.

== Biography ==
Vahe Kartalian was born on August 13, 1922, in Detroit, Michigan, the son of Armenian immigrants. He had four sisters and one brother. When Kartalian was two, their family moved to New York City. His father, a baker, died when he was 11. Kartalian attended Armenian school. During World War II, Kartalian served in the United States Navy on a destroyer in the Pacific theatre. After returning home, he worked as a body builder and professional wrestler (called the "Hell's Kitchen Roughneck") and competed in both regional and national competitions. Kartalian decided to become an actor after being noticed by Broadway producers. He never took acting lessons.

Plays in which Kartalian appeared on Broadway included One More River (1960), Golden Fleecing (1959), and Romeo and Juliet (1951). In Romeo and Juliet, he played Sampson alongside Olivia de Havilland as Juliet.

Kartalian appeared in more than 70 films and television shows between 1953 and his retirement in 2006. Kartalian is best known for his role in the film Planet of the Apes (1968) as Julius, the brutish gorilla who guarded the captive humans at the Research Complex. He later played the gorilla Frank in the third film of the series, Conquest of the Planet of the Apes (1972). Kartalian is also known for his film roles as a sailor in Mister Roberts (1955), a prisoner in Cool Hand Luke (1967), a shopkeeper in The Outlaw Josey Wales (1976), and a reverend in The Rock (1996).

On television, Kartalian appeared on various shows, including Naked City, The Untouchables, Get Smart, The Munsters, Batman, Lou Grant, Cagney & Lacey, and Friends. Kartalian also had a regular role as Bruce W. Wolf in Monster Squad (1976).

He appeared at the 1971 Renaissance Pleasure Faire in a public portrayal of "Hercules Magnificus, The Strongest Man in the Known World".

== Personal life ==
On January 9, 1952, Kartalian married Mary Evonne Bannister in the Curran Theatre in San Francisco. The ceremony took place on the set of the play Mr. Roberts, in which Kartalian was appearing. They later divorced. Kartalian married Margaret Poloshjian in 1959. They had three children: Aram, Julie, and Jason. Jason Kartalian became a film producer and director.

Kartalian died on May 24, 2016, in a hospital in Mission Hills, California, at age 93.

== Filmography ==
=== Film ===
Year	Title	Role	Notes
1955	Cell 2455 Death Row	Monk	
1955	Mister Roberts	Mason	
1961	Sail a Crooked Ship	Finster	
1965	Morituri	Merchant Marine	Uncredited
1967	The Young Warriors	Soldier In Squad Attacking Tank	
1967	Devil's Angels	Funky	
1967	Cool Hand Luke	"Dynamite"	
1968	Planet of the Apes	Julius	
1968	The Acid Eaters	Artie / The Devil	
1968	Stay Away, Joe	"Bull" Shortgun	
1969	Mark of the Gun	Bert	
1969	Women for All Reasons	Unknown	
1970	Myra Breckinridge	Jeff	
1970	Booby Trap	Scarpo	
1971	Blood Legacy	Igor Garin	
1971	Bunny O'Hare	Sensitivity Group	
1971	Octaman	Raul	
1972	Conquest of the Planet of the Apes	Frank, The Gorilla	
1973	Please Don't Eat My Mother	Henry Fudd	
1975	Sons of Sassoun	Unknown	
1976	The Outlaw Josey Wales	The Shopkeeper	
1980	The Man with Bogart's Face	Nicky	
1982	Forty Days of Musa Dagh	Village Spokesman	
1985	Gymkata	The Kahn	
1987	Checkpoint	Bus Driver	
1987	Real Men	Produce Hawker	
1992	Big Girls Don't Cry... They Get Even	Dog Owner	
1995	Josh Kirby... Time Warrior: Chapter 3, Trapped on Toyworld	Gepetto	Direct-to-video
1996	The Rock	Reverend	
1997	Eight Days a Week	Nonno, Marge's Dad	
1999	My Favorite Martian	Muscle Man	
1999	The Art of a Bullet	Henry	
2000	The Flintstones in Viva Rock Vegas	Old Man At Bronto King	
2000	Pedestrian	Unknown	
2000	Dave's Blind Date	Gene	Short
2000	Magicians	The Bagel Shop Clerk	
2001	Tomcats	Grandfather MacDonald	
2002	The Third Wheel	Old Man	
2005	Standing Still	Older Man	
2005	Extreme Dating	Earl	
2006	Cattle Call	The Janitor	(final film role)

=== Television ===
Year	Title	Role	Notes
1953	Robert Montgomery Presents	Unknown	Episode: "No Picnic at Mt. Kenya"
1959	Naked City	Sanitation Department Foreman / Sanitation Worker	2 episodes
1962	Don't Call Me Charlie!	M.P.	Episode: "A Friend in Need"
1962	The Gallant Men	Joey Lopuschok	Episode: "And the End of Evil Things"
1962–1963	The Untouchables	Al Gross / Nate Stryker	2 episodes
1963	Arrest and Trial	Eddie, The Paramedic	Episode: "Inquest Into a Bleeding Heart"
1964	Voyage to the Bottom of the Sea	Crew Member	Episode: "Eleven Days to Zero"
1964	No Time for Sergeants	The Foreman	Episode: "Do Me a Favor and Don't Do Me Any"
1965	Get Smart	Leopold	Episode: "Our Man in Toyland"
1965	The Munsters	The 2nd Workman	Episode: "Underground Munster"
1966	McHale's Navy	The Waiter	Episode: "McHale's Country Club Caper"
1966	Batman	John	Episode: "Hot Off the Griddle"
1968	The Wild Wild West	Lieutenant Bengston	Episode: "The Night of the Pelican"
1968–1969	Here Come the Brides	Sam / Jason's Man	6 episodes
1970	Breakout	Hogan	Television film
1971	Goodbye, Raggedy Ann	Tony	Television film
1971–1972	Nichols	Samuel	3 episodes
1973	The New Perry Mason	Prison Snitch	Episode: "The Case of the Perilous Pen"
1974	Run, Joe, Run	Horn	Episode: "Yardbirds"
1976	Monster Squad	Bruce W. Wolf	13 episodes
1977	The Red Hand Gang	Kidnapper	4 episodes
1980–1981	Lou Grant	"Red" Borotra / Leon Hartounian	2 episodes
1983	Cagney & Lacey	Rocky Menukian	Episode: "Open and Shut Case"
1995	Friends	Frankie	Episode: "The One with Ross's New Girlfriend"
1995	Guideposts Junction	Grandfather	Episode: "Angels, Angels"
1996	The Jamie Foxx Show	Rutherford B. White	Episode: "And Bubba Makes Three"
1996	Life with Roger	Dave	Episode: "Love Thy Neighbor"
1996	ER	Lloyd Frick	Episode: "Union Station"
2000	Felicity	Guard	Episode: "Docuventary II"
2000	Son of the Beach	Papa Gigio	Episode: "Mario Putzo's 'The Last Dong'"
2000	Curb Your Enthusiasm	Shoe Repair Guy	Episode: "Ted and Mary"
2002	Even Stevens	Old Guy #2	Episode: "Boy on a Rock"
2002	Just Shoot Me!	The Clerk	Episode: "Guess Who's Coming to Blush"
2003	Recipe for Disaster	Luigi	Television film
2004	Rodney	Elderly Man	Episode: "It's Up, It's Good"
2005	How I Met Your Mother	Henry	Episode: "Return of the Shirt"
