= The Slum Stars =

2017 film by Sandeep Singh Bawa

- Directed by: Sandeep Singh Bawa
- Screenplay by: Sheel Choudhary; Anashwar Chopra; Aishwarya Nidhi Gaur
- Story by: Sheel Choudhary; Anashwar Chopra; Aishwarya Nidhi Gaur
- Produced by: Harpreet Kaur Dhillon
- Starring: Survinder Vicky; Gurpreet Singh Tuti; Abhiraj Singh Thakur
- Cinematography: Uttan Dhakal
- Edited by: Ashok Shrivastva and Puneet Asp
- Music by: Asheem Mangoli
- Production company: Dhillon Records Entertainment Pvt Ltd
- Release date: 7 July 2017
- Country: India
- Language: Hindi

The Slum Stars is a 2017 Indian children's film directed by Sandeep Singh Bawa and produced by Harpreet Kaur Dhillon. The film has a multiple cast of debuting child-artists. The film was shot in and around Chandigarh, and in the Punjab and Rajasthan.

== Plot ==
The film is about a gang of innocent abandoned kids named Kahaniya, Gudiya and Chandu who lead troubled lives in slums. The Child trafficker; Ghutan, a local don and his keep Surma use their terror to sell these kids. Ghutan is controlled by a bogus Swami a criminal who fakes himself as a spiritual leader. Swami is led by Netaji, a greedy politician who has an upper hand in all the crimes.

When Gudiya becomes one of the victim forced by Surma into sexual exploitation, these kids decide to run away from these people who are trying destroying their lives. They somehow travel from the city through dusty roads that lead them into a village in Rajasthan where they meet a Ghost. This ghost then helps the kids to teach Ghutan, Surma, Netaji and other criminal a lesson through his powers.

== Cast ==
- Chiragdeep Gill as Kahaniya
- Ridhima Malhotra as Gudiya
- Yashwan Chopra as Chandu
- GurpreetSingh Tuti as Dharam Guru
- Abhiraj Singh Thakur as Kala Dhan
- Survinder Vicky as MLA
- Balkar Singh Dhillon as Retired Army Officer
- Naginder as Sekh
- Amrit Pal Chotu as Ghost
- KapilKalyan as Koyla
- Rakshit as Genda
- Harpreet Singh as Sursand
- Harry Sachdev as Ghutan
- GoniSagoo as Surma
- Daman PreetKuar as KhaniyaMaa
- Nitin Arora as Gunda
- DarshanGharoo as Dhaba Owner
- Bhuwan Azad as Surdass
- JagdeepLamba as Truck Driver
- Nikk Arora as Truck Driver asst.
