= Semillas que el mar arrastra =

- Directed by: El Hadji Samba Sarr
- Screenplay by: El Hadji Samba Sarr
- Produced by: Tinglado Film, Caja Canarias, Ebène Productions
- Starring: Mamadu Gueye, Vieux Lelou, Odiane Macisse, Youssufa Coly, Saliou Thiam, Moussa Diallo, Medoune Cisse
- Cinematography: El Hadji Samba Sarr
- Edited by: El Hadji Samba Sarr
- Music by: Mamadou Sène, Yuma
- Release date: 2008
- Running time: 52 minutes
- Countries: Senegal; Spain

Semillas que el mar arrastra is a 2008 documentary film.

== Synopsis ==
In Africa there are many children that dream of crossing the sea, leaving their families and homes behind, believing that they'll have a real chance on the other side. Those that manage to make the crossing soon discover that reality is far from what they had imagined when they find themselves in the internment centers. This documentary lends its voice to those under age immigrants that long for a better life.

== Awards ==
- Festival Image & Vie 2007
