= Slumlord Millionaire =

2024 documentary film about New York City housing crisis

- Directed by: Steph Ching; Ellen Martinez
- Release date: 2024
- Country: United States

Slumlord Millionaire is a 2024 documentary film that explores the New York City housing crisis by examining gentrification, predatory landlords, and the influence of real estate developers. It was directed by Steph Ching and Ellen Martinez.
