= Leprosy in Japan =

As of 2009, 2,600 former leprosy patients were living in 13 national sanatoriums and 2 private hospitals in Japan. Their mean age is 80 years old. From the Meiji Period (1868–1912) and up until 1996, people diagnosed with leprosy in Japan were notably subjected to discrimination.

== History ==
=== Ancient and medieval ages ===
The route of leprosy into Japan has not been settled, but the presence of leprosy in Japan, at least in the Nara period (710–784), and the earliest record of leprosy in Korea at Cheju Island in 1445, suggests that leprosy came from the South.

In a collection of government documents titled "Ryounogige" and written in 833, leprosy was described as the following: "It is caused by a parasite which eats five organs of the body. The eyebrows and eyelashes come off, and the nose is deformed. The disease brings hoarseness and necessitates amputations of the fingers and toes. Do not sleep with the patients, as the disease is transmittable to those nearby." This is the first document in the world that identifies leprosy as transmissible since there had been no such documents in China. Kensuke Mitsuda thought that this was because of the frequent conflation of scabies with leprosy since scabies is easily transmitted.

According to a legend, Empress Komyo washed a leprosy patient in the 8th century.

In medieval times, people with leprosy were discriminated against and lived separately from the main dwelling areas of the villages. This discrimination was bolstered by religion — one of the sutras of the Nichiren sect stated that "those who do not respect this sutra will get leprosy in the next stage of life."

During the short period (1549–1611) when Catholic priests were allowed to preach Christianity, they built special hospitals where they treated leprosy patients. This came to an end when the Tokugawa Government enacted the death penalty for the crime of being a Catholic.

Otani Yoshitsugu, a famous samurai of the Sengoku era, also suffered from leprosy. It was said to be one of the factors that led to his defeat at the battle of Sekigahara in 1600.

=== The Meiji Era (1868–1912) ===
Japan reopened its doors to foreign countries in 1868, and the power went to the Emperor and the democratic government. Checkpoints between provinces were abolished in 1871, and leprosy patients could also freely travel in the country. In the same year, leprosy patients began to line up on the road to Honmyoji, a noted temple in Kumamoto, Kyushu, Japan, for mercy. The first national survey conducted in 1904 indicated that there were 30,359 patients, but because of the methodology, this figure may be vastly underestimated. The Meiji Period notably ushered in the beginning of widespread leprosy discrimination in Japan. In 1907, the Japanese government enacted Law No. 11 of 1907 (commonly known as "(Old) Leprosy Prevention Law") which stipulated that homeless patients with no means of medical treatment (vagrants) should be isolated in sanatoriums. It was acknowledged that many people who were affected by leprosy were living outdoors and begging. In addition, people who had leprosy were also not allowed to have children and could not return to their hometowns even after they were cured.

=== Christian missionaries and Japanese savers ===
Japanese people were accustomed to seeing people with leprosy begging for money at temples and shrines, or wherever people gathered, but this was a shocking event to Europeans. Upon seeing a miserable 30-year-old woman abandoned near a watermill, Father Testevuide became determined to establish a facility for such people. In 1889, he started the Kohyama Fukusei Hospital. His example was followed by Kate Youngman in Tokyo, and by Miss Hannah Riddell and Father Corre in Kumamoto.

In 1875, Dr. Masafumi Goto founded the Kihai Hospital in Tokyo which was specially designed to treat leprosy patients. Dr. Goto and his son, Dr. Masanao Goto, became widely known for their balneotherapy for leprosy patients. At the request of the King of the Hawaiian Kingdom, Dr. Masasao Goto visited Hawaii and introduced their method. Most of the Japanese doctors who established these facilities discontinued their activities after the start of public leprosy sanatoriums.

=== 1905 epoch-making meeting ===
In 1895, Hannah Riddell established the Kaishun Hospital in Kumamoto and her activities are mentioned elsewhere. Because of the Russo-Japanese War, she was in desperate financial straits because English people stopped sending money to her because of the risks that could occur during the sending process. An important meeting was held at the Banker's Club in Tokyo, both to save her and to discuss leprosy problems facing Japan. Various leaders, including those representing the government, statesmen, and journalists, attended the meeting. The Japanese government had begun to take an interest in leprosy problems since they found many patients in the drafts for military service. To become strong militarily was their biggest concern at the time. The meeting was chaired by Viscount Shibuzawa, who was a leading businessman. At the meeting, Kensuke Mitsuda stressed that leprosy was infectious. Finally, the Japanese government, spurred by the events of the 1905 meeting, promulgated the first leprosy prevention law in 1907 and started five public sanatoriums in 1909.

=== "No Leprosy Patients in Prefecture" Movement ===
At the start of public sanatoriums, only the wandering patients were hospitalized. However, as time went on, people wanted their prefectures to be "purified," and the belief began that there should be no leprosy patients in these prefectures. This movement started around 1930 and it naturally worsened the leprosy stigma. In Kumamoto, 157 patients living near Honmyoji were "arrested" and transferred to other sanatoriums. A patient received unjust procedures and was sentenced to the death penalty. In 1931, the 1907 Leprosy Prevention Law was amended to expand the required forced isolation of people with leprosy to also non-homeless people.

=== War and leprosy ===
In 1945, many patients died of tuberculosis in mainland Japanese sanatoriums because of food shortage at a rate of 20% at the worst leprosaria or leper colony. In Okinawa, more than 25% of patients died in the sanatorium in the same year. In the Miyako Nanseien, Okinawa, the death rate was over 40% in 1945 and the cause of death was almost always malaria. It was reported that in a psychiatric hospital in Tokyo (Tokyo Metropolitan Matsuzawa Boi), the death rate in 1945 was 40%

The rate of death for inpatients at 10 national sanatoriums is shown in the table below:

- In 1945 and 1946, excluding Suruga Sanatorium
- In 1947 - 1955, all sanatoriums except Amami Wakoen Sanatorium, Okinawa Airakuen Sanatorium and Miyako Nanseien Sanatorium.

The mean rate of death of patients at Japanese sanatoriums
Year	mean rate of death
1945	14.8
1946	8.8
1947	6.6
1948	4.7
1949	4.1
1950	2.8
1951	2.2
1952	1.6
1953	1.3
1954	1.5
1955	1.6

=== The 1953 Leprosy Prevention Law and Patients' Struggle ===
Kensuke Mitsuda stated before the Upper House in 1951 that all patients should be hospitalized. This was a segregation policy and all patients were against it. Some of them staged protests, even hunger strikes, but the 1953 leprosy prevention law was passed. There were practically no changes from the strict 1931 leprosy prevention law.

=== The expressed view of the Japan Leprosy Association ===
Hiroshi Shima, Fujio Otani, Minoru Narita, and Kunio Murakami were primary movers in the abolition of Japan's Leprosy Prevention Law. It was delayed because the opinions of patient autonomy associations differed.

=== The statement of the Japanese Leprosy Association on the Leprosy Prevention Law ===
It is said that the leprosy control method in Japan was greatly influenced by the First International Congress of Leprosy in 1897, at which it was concluded that isolation of patients was the best method of leprosy control. However, this did not mean indiscriminate isolation of patients. The Interior Ministry of Japan replied to a question that "the salvation of wandering patients" be given priority, above that of prevention. Absolute isolation was based on two views; 1) that leprosy occurs through intimate contact within the families in which any patients would be the source of infection, and 2) leprosy would be incurable for the rest of a patient's lifetime. Absolute isolation was supported by the social belief of that day; leprosy is a shameful disease and the purity of the nation (absence of leprosy patients) should be maintained, thus justifying isolation. Complete isolation was given priority rather than the salvation of patients.

In Japan, a number of patients had been found during the draft for military service. Between 1897 and 1937, leprosy patients found at the draft kept decreasing. There were major national censuses between 1919 and 1935, during which the number of leprosy patients kept decreasing. Epidemiologically speaking, improvement in the living conditions has been given credit for this decrease, rather than the results of isolation. Japan was on its way to decreasing the number of leprosy patients, irrespective of enforced isolation. In other words, statistically speaking, the present leprosy prevention law had not been necessary.

Nevertheless, the 1953 revision of the leprosy prevention law was passed and enforced. At that time, the effects of chemotherapy were apparent, and internationally, isolation had not been supported at the Rome Conference on rehabilitation. Dapsone and rifampicin were used for the medical treatment of leprosy. In 1982, the infectivity of Mycobacterium leprae was found to disappear within several doses of rifampicin, and a multidrug therapeutic regimen (MDT) was proposed. This has become the standard regimen for leprosy control. Recently, new quinolones were added to medical treatment.

New leprosy patients should be treated on an outpatient basis, within the framework of the health insurance system. Hansen's disease centers should be established and specialists be trained. Outpatient treatment became possible even at the onset of the disease, and patients with erythema nodosum leprosum and leprous neuritis can be treated without much difficulty.

Although there have been mysteries left unsolved concerning leprosy, such as the mode of transmission or the relationship between infection and development of symptoms, there were no reports suggesting leprosy is beyond the concept of ordinary infections.

Therefore, the present law lost its basis for existence; medically speaking, the law deserved to be abrogated. As late as 1955, 91 percent of leprosy patients were hospitalized in leprosaria. Outpatient treatment became popular, but the management of patients continued to be leprosarium-centered. This did not align with the World Health Organization (WHO), which aims at the coexistence of patients and society. Therefore, Japan's management of leprosy was far from the remainder of the world. It cannot be denied that the isolation within the leprosaria made those working at hospitals and universities lose interest in the treatment of leprosy. The Japanese Leprosy Association deeply reflected on these matters, however, they did not lead toward an abrogation of the outdated law. They did not point out this failure of leprosy control because those working in leprosaria occupied the central part of the association, and they let the law exist to the present time.

Leprosy control should be nothing but medical control. It was our failure that we advocated isolation with a view to arousing public opinion, thereby stirring up the fear of leprosy in this country. The Japanese Leprosy Association and Japanese medical world need to reflect on this and recognize this fact again.

=== The trials ===
The Zenkankyo (Patients' Union) staged a number of struggles against the Ministry of Welfare and finally ended enforcement of the 1953 Leprosy Prevention Law in 1996. It was ruled that the law was unconstitutional between 1960 and 1996. During this period, the law should have not been present. In 1998, many patients sued the Government for compensation and won in 2001.

== Leprosy prevention law ==
=== Leprosy Prevention Law of 1907 ===
The patients who do not have supporting men and women shall be treated in public leprosaria. Those who have supporters shall be cared for by them.

=== Leprosy Prevention Law of 1931 ===
Patients with leprosy shall be hospitalized in leprosaria. (However, it is not compulsory at the start.) Patients should not be engaged in works which may transmit leprosy. The families of patients shall be given some financial aid. The privacy of patients should be respected by physicians and related workers.

=== Leprosy Prevention Law of 1953 ===
- Article 1. The aim of the law is to prevent the spread of leprosy, to provide medical care and to promote the welfare of leprosy patients, thus contributing to the general public health.
- Article 2. The national government and local public bodies shall, at all times, strive to prevent leprosy, to provide medical care for leprosy patients and to promote the welfare of the patients. These bodies shall also try to disseminate accurate knowledge of leprosy.
- Article 3. No one shall discriminate the patients or those related to the patients because of this disease.
- Article 4. After a physician has diagnosed the examinee as patient, or after examining or performing autopsy on the dead body of the patient, the physician must, as stipulated by the Ministry of Health and Welfare Ordinance, instruct the method of disinfection and other preventive measures to the patient, his guardian, those living with the patient, those in charge of the premises where the dead body is or was found, and shall also notify within 7 days the particulars stipulated by that Ordinance to the Prefectural Governor of the place of residence of the patient, or the premises where the dead body was found.
- Article 5. When the Prefectural Governor finds it necessary, he may ask a designated physician to examine a patient or one who is, with sufficient reasons, suspected of being patient.
  - 2. The physician indicated in the preceding paragraph shall be selected from among those with more than three years' experience in leprosy work and after obtaining consent of the said physician.
- Article 6. When the Prefectural Governor finds that a patient may communicate leprosy, the Governor may encourage the patient or his guardian that the patient be hospitalized in a national leprosarium established by the National Government.
  - 2. If the patient or his guardian does not follow this encouragement, as stipulated in the above paragraph, the Prefectural Governor may order the patient or his guardian to be hospitalized for a fixed period of time.
  - 3. When one who has been ordered to be hospitalized fail to comply with this disorder, or when there is no time to follow the necessary procedures for hospitalizing the patient in a leprosarium in the interest of public health, as stipulated in the preceding paragraph, the Governor may send the patient directly to a national leprosarium.
- Article 15. The in-patients may not leave the national leprosarium and may be allowed to leave only in the following instances.
  - (1) that there is a special condition such as the death, serious illness, or afflictions of relatives, and when the director grants permission in the view that the patient's going out does not affect the prevention of spread of leprosy seriously.
  - (2) omitted.
- Article 16. The in-patients shall devote themselves to the treatment and abide by the rules of the leprosarium.
  - 2. When an in-patient violates the rules of the leprosarium, the director may impose the following punishments on the patient concerned, in order to maintain order within the leprosarium.
    - (1) To give a warning to the patient;
    - (2) To confine the patient for a term not exceeding 30 days.

=== Laws repealed ===
All of these laws were repealed in 1996.

== 2001 court ruling, apology and patient compensation policy ==
In May 2001, the Kumamoto District Court ordered the Japanese government to pay compensation to former Japanese leprosy patients. The Japanese government soon afterwards declined to fight the ruling. The Minister of Health, Labor and Welfare would also issue an apology. The Japanese Diet would also pass the Act on Payment of Compensation for Leprosy Sanatoria Residents (Act No. 63 of 2001). In 2002, the Japanese government would also agree to compensate former leprosy patients who were not forced to live in sanitoriums.

== 2019 court ruling and family compensation laws ==
On June 28, 2019, a Kumamoto court found in favor of more than 500 relatives of former leprosy patients seeking damages from discriminatory isolation, ordering the Japanese government to pay a total of 370 million yen ($3.4 million). On November 15, 2019, the Japanese Diet (parliamentary body) passed the Act on the Payment of Compensation to Families of Former Hansen’s Disease (Leprosy) Patients (Law No.55 of 2019), which came into force on November 22, 2019. Under the law, the Japanese government acknowledged how former leprosy patients’ family members suffered great distress and hardship over many years under the nation's leprosy discrimination policy, owing to, among other things, the difficulty of forming the types of familial relationships they desired with the patients within a context of prejudice and discrimination. The law also required the government to pay compensation to eligible family members of former leprosy patients while residing in Japan or Japanese controlled land outside of Japan up to August 15, 1945, such as Taiwan, Korea, or other region. In July 2024, the compensation filing deadline was extended to November 21, 2029.

== The Japanese sanatoriums ==
=== 13 national sanatoriums ===
- Matsugaoka Hoyoen. Aomori-ken Aomori-shi ishie, 1909-
- Tohoku Shinseien. Miyagiken Tobe-shi, Sako-machi, 1939-
- Kuryu Rakusen-en. Gunma-ken Azuma-gun Kusatsu-cho, 1932-
- Tama Zenshoen. Tokyo-to Higashimurayama-shi, 1909-
- Suruga Ryoyosho. Shizuoka-ken Getenba-shi, 1944-
- Nagashima Aiseien. Okayama-ken, Setouchi-shi, 1930-
- Oku Komyoen. Okayama-ken, Setouchi-shi, 1938 (as Sotojima Hoyoen, 1909–1934)
- Ooshima Seishoen. Kagawa-ken Kida-gun Aji-cho, 1909-
- Kikuchi Keifuen. Kumamoto-ken Koushi-shi, 1909-
- Hoshizuka Keiaien. Kagoshima-ken Kanoya-shi, 1935-
- Amami Wakoen. Kagoshima-ken Amami-shi, 1944-
- Okinawa Airakuen. Okinawa-ken Nago-shi, 1938-
- Miyako Nanseien. Okinawa-ken Miyakojima-shi, 1931-

=== Private sanatoriums ===
- Kouyama Fukusei Byoin. Shizuoka-ken Getenba-shi, 1889-
- Tairoin Shinryosho. Kumamoto-ken Kumamoto-shi, 1898-

=== Previous sanatoriums ===
Name	Place	Founder (or related persons)	Years
Kihai Byoin (Hospital)	Tokyo	Masafumi Goto	1875–1907?
Yoikuin	Tokyo	Kensuke Mitsuda (Kaishun Ward)	1901–1904
Ihaien	Tokyo	Kate M. Youngman	1894–1942
Kaishun Byoin (Hospital)	Kumamoto	Hannah Riddell	1895–1941
Jinkeien	Yamanashi-ken	Ryumyo Tsunawaki	1906–1992
St. Barnabas Home	Gunma-ken	Cornwall Legh	1916–1941
Suzuranen	Gunma-ken	Kesako Hattori	1926–1931
Manchuria Sanatorium Doukouin	Tetsurei-ken, Manchuria	Shunzo Sugimura	1939–1945

=== Other facilities ===
- National Hansen's Disease Museum
  - Tokyo-to Higashi-murayama-shi.
- National Infection Research Center. Leprosy Research Center
  - Tokyo-to Higashi-murayama-shi.
- Okinawa-ken. Yuuna Kyokai
  - Okinawa-ken Naha-shi.

== Life in the sanatoriums ==
=== The present situation ===
About 2,600 former patients have been treated in 13 national Hansen's disease sanatoriums and 2 private hospitals as of May 1, 2009. There are no active leprosy patients, and all have recovered or have after-effects of leprosy. Their mean age is 80 years old. Because of sterilization and abortion, they do not have children. Many of them have diseases because of advanced age or handicaps, and aids are necessary. Some earnestly hope for social rehabilitation, but there are very few who are active in society.

Those in the sanatoriums enjoy life in or out of the sanatoriums; medical and living care are provided with the help of doctors and health workers. Their families visit them in sanatoriums and vice versa. They may be treated in other medical facilities, if necessary.

=== Religions ===
Every leprosy sanatorium in Japan has churches and Buddhist temples. (There are no temples attached to sanatoriums in Okinawa Prefecture.) It is true that patients had faith, though some patients stated that deciding on religion was in preparation for their death in the leprosaria. In days gone by, they could not share the family graves, an instance of leprosy stigma. In Kikuchi Keifuen Leprosarium, statistics showed Buddhism A 757, B 85, C 89, D (Sokagakkai) 51, Shintoism A 11, Shintoism B 9, Catholic 51, and Christianity 95, as of 1979.

=== Abortions and sterilization ===
Since 1915, sterilization was performed in public sanatoriums in Japan. Married life was permitted. Abortions were performed. Because of this, patients did not have children.

Of the Leprosy Prevention laws of 1907, 1931, and 1953, only the last one was repealed in 1996 which permitted the segregation of patients in sanitariums where forced abortions and sterilization were common (even if the laws did not refer to it), and authorized the punishment of patients "disturbing peace".

=== Literature ===
Some patients wrote novels, and many patients composed Tanka and Haiku, a short poem.

=== Education ===
Education in prewar days was unsatisfactory. Educated patients taught patients who needed education. In postwar days, branch schools of primary schools and secondary schools were made within the leprosaria. A high school was built starting in 1955; 369 patients were enrolled and 307 patients graduated from the school.

Education of children born of leprosy patients was insufficient. In Kumamoto, the enrollment of these children into a primary school met with social stigma or leprosy stigma in 1954, which was called the Tatsudaryo Incident or Kurokamikou Incident.

== Leprosy stigma ==
Leprosy in Japan is characterized by considerable stigma, the Buddhistic concept that leprosy is punishment, and in modern times, by three leprosy prevention laws requesting segregation.

== Personalities ==
=== Empress Teimei ===
Empress Teimei (貞明皇后, Teimei Kōgō, 25 June 1884 – 17 May 1951), also known as Empress Dowager Teimei (貞明皇太后, Teimei-kōtaigō), was empress consort of Emperor Taishō of Japan. She was the mother of Emperor Shōwa. Her posthumous name, Teimei, means "enlightened constancy". She was interested in leprosy problems and donated money to Hannah Riddell in financial distress since 1915, and other foreigners. She donated money with which a leprosy prevention foundation was established in 1931 and left money upon her death which became the basis of the Tofu Organization for Leprosy, in 1951.

=== Kensuke Mitsuda ===
Kensuke Mitsuda (1876–1964) was the most influential leader both in the administration of leprosy policy and the academic circle. He stated before the Upper House in 1951 that all leprosy patients be hospitalized which led to the 1953 leprosy prevention law. As a scholar, he found a lepromin reaction called Mitsuda reaction or Mitsuda test. This is very important in the classification of leprosy.

=== Hannah Riddell ===
Hannah Riddell (1855–1932) was an English woman who devoted her life to the salvation of Hansen's disease patients in Japan. She not only established "Kaishun Hospital", the first leprosy hospital in Kumamoto, but also inspired the conscience of the Japanese people on this problem.

=== Mary Cornwall-Legh ===
Mary Cornwall-Legh (May 20, 1857 – December 18, 1941) was a highly educated English woman who devoted herself, after age 50, to missionary work in Japan and especially to the welfare, education, and medical care of leprosy patients in Kusatsu, Gunma Prefecture, Japan.

=== Keisai Aoki ===
Keisai Aoki (April 8, 1893 – March 6, 1969) was a Japanese missionary who virtually paved the way to the establishment of the Hansen's disease sanatorium Kunigami-Airakuen, Okinawa, with extraordinary difficulties. At age 16, he developed leprosy and later, under the leadership of Hannah Riddell, helped people with leprosy in Okinawa.

=== Matsuki Miyazaki ===
Matsuki Miyazaki (1900–1970) was the director of the Kyushu Sanatorium (1934–1958). He studied the war and leprosy and because of his efforts, soldiers who developed leprosy could receive the same treatment as those who developed tuberculosis. He was a segregationist. After retiring from the Kikuchi Keifuen Sanatorium (Kyushu Sanatorium), he established a leprosy facility in India. He died in an airplane accident in India.

=== Isamu Masuda ===
Isamu Masuda (1872–1945) was a Japanese doctor, known for writing "Leprosy and Social Problems" in 1907, the year of the promulgation of the first leprosy law, and openly criticized the crucial segregation policy. He advocated for the nation's involvement in the discovery of treatments for leprosy, since he believed that it was curable.

=== Masako Ogawa ===
Masako Ogawa (1902–1943) was a female Japanese doctor who worked at the Nagashima Aiseien Sanatorium. She wrote a book, "Spring in a small island" in 1938, about her experience in remote areas of Japan and persuading leprosy patients into hospitalization. It created a sensation in Japan and was made into a film. However, she was criticized for accelerating the "No leprosy patients in prefecture" movement and giving the impression that leprosy is to be feared.

=== Masasue Suho ===
Masasue Suho (October 8, 1885 – June 20, 1942) was a Japanese physician, the director of the Sorok Island Sanatorium in Korea. He completed the world's biggest leprosy facility Sorok Island Sanatorium, hospitalizing 6,000 patients. He was assassinated by a patient while rushing to a morning ceremony. Forced segregation of leprosy patients, the worsening of treatment of patients, and antipathy against colonial rule were reasons behind the assassination.

=== Ryumyo Tsunawaki ===
Ryumyo Tsunawaki (January 24, 1876 – December 5, 1970) was a Buddhist priest who established a leprosy hospital Minobu Jinkyo-en, in Minobu-cho, Yamanashi-ken, Japan in 1906.

=== Noboru Ogasawara ===
Noboru Ogasawara (1888–1970) was a Japanese physician specializing in leprosy. He was an assistant professor at the Department of Kyoto Imperial University. He insisted that leprosy was not incurable and diathesis was an important factor in the development of leprosy. He was against strict segregation of leprosy patients and met strong opposition at a Congress of Leprosy.

=== Masanao Goto ===
Masanao Goto (1857–1908) was a Japanese leprologist. He was the son of the first Shobun Goto and called as the second Shobun Goto. He devoted his life to leprosy patients in Japan and the island of Molokai in the Kingdom of Hawaii. Father Damien had trust in Goto's therapy, and he left the message, "I have not the slightest confidence in our American and European doctors to stay my leprosy, I wish to be treated by Dr. Masanao Goto."

=== Mosuke Murata ===
Mosuke Murata was a Japanese dermatologist who was the designator of erythema nodosum leprosum (ENL) in 1912.

=== Mieko Kamiya ===
Mieko Kamiya (1914–1979) was a psychiatrist who treated leprosy patients at Nagashima Aiseien Sanatorium. She was known for the translation of books on philosophy. She was said to be "one of doctors of the Department of psychiatry of Tokyo University soon after the war", who "greatly helped the Ministry of Education and the General Headquarters as English-speaking secretary", and to be "an adviser to Empress Michiko". She wrote many books as a highly educated, multi-lingual person. One of her books titled for the meaning of life (Ikigai in Japanese) was based on her experiences with leprosy patients and attracted many readers.

=== Kazuo Saikawa ===
Kazuo Saikawa (1918–2007) was a Japanese physician who contributed to the treatment of leprosy and the administration of leprosy policy in Japan. He was against Kensuke Mitsuda and worked in Taiwan and Okinawa.

=== Heibei Okamura ===
Heibei Okamura (1852–1934) produced Japan's finest "Okamura's" chaulmoogra oil, between about 1892 and 1944 at Sakai, Osaka, Japan. The chaulmoogra oil had been the only one remedy in wide use before Guy Henry Faget proved the efficacy of promin in 1943. Promin started the era of sulfur chemicals and revolutionized the treatment of leprosy. Okamura was also known for caring for more than 1,000 leprosy patients between 1888 and 1901 in his house.

=== Suketoshi Chujo ===
Suketoshi Chujo (中條資俊 1872–1947) was a Japanese physician, a Hansen's disease researcher, AND the first director of Matsugaoka Hoyoen Sanatorium (1909–1947). He repeatedly reported that turpentine spirit preparation named TR was effective for leprosy.

=== Isamu Tajiri ===
Isamu Tajiri (1902–1966) was a Japanese physician specializing in leprosy. He worked at Nagashima Aiseien Sanatorium, Kikuchi Keifuen Sanatorium and Tama Zenshoen Sanatorium. In 1955, he proposed "acute infiltration" of leprosy.

=== Shigetaka Takashima ===
Shigetaka Takashima (1907–1985) was a Japanese physician and studied leprosy. He worked in Kuryu Rakusen-en Sanatorium, Tohoku Shinseien Sanatorium, Suruga Sanatorium, and Nagashima Aiseien Sanatorium.

=== Fumio Hayashi ===
Fumio Hayashi (1900–1947) was a Japanese physician and leprologist. He worked in Tama Zenshoen Sanatorium, Nagashima Aiseien Sanatorium, Hoshizuka Keiaien Sanatorium, and Ooshima Seishoen Sanatorium. He helped with Kensuke Mitsuda, and completed the first lepromin test or Mitsuda skin test.

=== Kageyoshi Tada ===
Kageyoshi Tada (?-1950) was a Japanese physician who worked in Miyako Nanseien Sanatorium, Okinawa Prefecture Japan between 1938 and 1945. He put inpatients who were forcibly hospitalized under strict control. Barb wired fences were built around the sanatorium and a special prison was also built such that inpatients could not go out of the sanatorium. In 1945, 110 inpatients died of malaria, malnutrition, and the direct effects of air attacks, while Tada's group escaped to the army shelter.

=== Kohsaburo Iesaka ===
Kohsaburo Iesaka 家坂幸三郎(1878–1952) was a Japanese Christian physician who headed the Miyako Nanseien Sanatorium (1933–1938) and Okinawa Airakuen Sanatorium (1947–1951). The church he created known as "Yomigaerino Kai" still remains in the Miyako Nanseien Sanatorium, as well as a church of Nippon Sei Ko Kai and a Catholic church.

=== Mamoru Uchida ===
Mamoru Uchida (内田守 1900–1982) was an ophthalmologist who worked for leprosy patients at Kyushu Sanatorium (Kikuchi Keifuen Sanatorium), Nagashima Aiseien Sanatorium, and Matsuoka Hoyoen Sanatorium. He taught leprosy patients "Tanka", in these sanatoriums. Later, he studied social welfare as professor at Kumamoto Junior College. He extensively studied the history of leprosy, and presented many documents to the Kumamoto Prefectural Library. Three hundred and thirty-eight items were shown at an exhibition of Hansen's disease and literature in 2003.

=== Shunsuke Miyake ===
Shunsuke Miyake (三宅俊輔1854–1926) was born in Shimane Prefecture and was qualified as a doctor. He practiced in Tsuwano, Yamaguchi, Nagasaki, and Taniyama. He was baptized in Yamaguchi Prefecture and did missionary work. He was asked to work at Kaishun Hospital by Hannah Riddell in 1897 and lived in the hospital until his death for 30 years. He worked as a buffer between Hannah Riddell and patients, although he looked as if he was a servant of the hospital. He was loved by patients.

=== Takekichi Sugai ===
Takekichi Sugai (菅井竹吉, 1871–1944) was the first chief doctor at Sotojima Hoyoen Sanatorium (1909–1923) who wrote many papers on leprosy. Sotojima Hoyoen was a public leprosy sanatorium in Osaka Prefecture and functional between 1909 and 1934.

=== Koh Yasuda ===
Koh Yasuda (保田耕, 1907–1943) was a Japanese ophthalmologist who became the first director of Amami Wakoen Sanatorium in Amami Ōshima, Kagoshima Prefecture, Japan. He was drafted into military service and died in China in 1943.

=== Taiji Nojima ===
Taiji Nojima (のじま たいじ, 1896–1970) was a Japanese dermatologist at Ooshima Seishoen Sanatorium, for 41 years and the director for 36 years. He attended many international leprosy congresses and visited many overseas leprosy sanatoriums.

=== Hakaru Miyagawa ===
Hakaru Miyagawa (宮川量 1905–1949) worked at Zensho Hospital, Tama Zenshoen Sanatorium, Nagashima Aiseien Leprosarium, Nagashima Aiseien Sanatorium, Okinawa Airakuen Leprosarium, Okinawa Airakuen Sanatorium, Hoshizuka Keiaien Leprosarium, and Hoshizuka Keiaien Sanatorium and studied the history of leprosy.

== Foreigners who worked for leprosy care ==
The Westerners who were involved in the care of leprosy patients which was based partly on the Modernization of Medicine and Foreigners (Souda) and others included:

- Baelz, Erwin Germany 1876–1905 (Kusatsu)
- Bertrand, Joseph Jean Augustin France 1890–1916 Fukusei Byoin
- Cornwall Legh, Mary Helena England 1908–41 (Kusatsu)
- Corre, Jean Marie France 1875–1911 Tairoin
- Drouart de Lézey, Lucien France 1873–1930 Fukusei Byoin
- Kidder, Anna H. USA 1875–1913 Ihaien
- Magill, Mary B. USA 1907–37 (Kusatsu)
- Oltmans, Albert USA 1886–1939 Ihaien
- Riddel, Hannah England 1873–91 Kaishun Byoin
- Testvuide, Germain Léger France 1872–92 Fukusei Byoin
- Vigroux, Francois Paulin France 1872–93 Fukusei Byoin
- Whitman, M. Antomelle USA 1886–1917 Ihaien
- Wirik, Loduska J. USA 1890–1914 Tokyo (Russo-Jap War)
- Wright, Adeleid, (Eddie) Hannah England 1896–1950 Kaishun Byoin
- Wyckoff, Martin Nevuis USA 1872–1911 Ihaien
- Youngman, Kate M. USA 1890–1942 Ihaien
- Five Sisters at Tairoin France, Canada 1898- Tairoin

== See also ==
- National Hansen's Disease Museum
