= Shigetaka Takashima =

Japanese physician (1907–1985)

- 高島 重孝
- Born: June 29, 1907; Tokyo, Japan
- Died: January 23, 1985 (aged 77)
- Education: Keio University
- Occupations: Physician, Director of Suruga Sanatorium and Nagashima Aiseien Sanatorium
- Known for: Studies on War and Leprosy (1948) and A guide to leprosy medicine (1970)

Shigetaka Takashima (高島 重孝, Takashima Shigetaka; June 29, 1907 – January 23, 1985) was a Japanese physicist and medical researcher. He worked in Kuryu Rakusen-en Sanatorium, Tohoku Shinseien Sanatorium, Suruga Sanatorium and Nagashima Aiseien Sanatorium.

== Life ==
Shigetaka Takashima was born in Tokyo on June 29, 1907. In 1931, he graduated from Keio University. In the same year, he entered Keio University's department of preventive medicine. In 1933, he worked in Kuryu Rakusen-en Sanatorium. In 1939, he worked in Tohoku Shinseien Sanatorium. In 1942, he worked in Musashi Sanatorium for the War Disabled. In 1943, he served as the acting director in Ehime Sanatorium for the War Disabled. In 1944, he was the acting director in Tokyo Sanatorium for the War Disabled. In December 1944, he was appointed the director of Suruga Sanatorium for the War Disabled. In December 1945, he became the director of Suruga Sanatorium. In August 1957, he was appointed director of Nagashima Aiseien Sanatorium following the retirement of Kensuke Mitsuda.

In April 1978, he was made honorary director of Nagashima Aiseien Sanatorium. He was given the First Order of the Sacred Treasure in 1978. Takashima died on January 23, 1985.

== War and leprosy ==
In 1947, he delivered a special lecture on war and leprosy at the Congress of the Japanese Leprosy Association, which was reported in the next year. He obtained correct data since he had worked for sanatoriums for the war disabled. He reported that the total number of leprosy in-patients who developed during service was 732; 0.13 per 1000 mobilized. If other conditions were included, he estimated that an average of 100 patients developed leprosy among soldiers and sailors per year. He also pointed out that the number of military patients per localities correlated with the number of patients who lived in these localities, and suggested that the military patients had been infected in childhood. Another point he stressed was that only 3 officers developed leprosy, while all others were soldiers and sailors.

== Other work ==
=== A Guide to Leprosy Medicine ===
In 1970, he compiled a textbook "A guide to leprosy (Rai Igaku no Tebiki)", which was the only one textbook of leprosy at that time. It was one year prior to the publication of the first edition of the Handbook of Leprosy by William Jopling.

=== Nagashima Bridge ===
He tried to construct a bridge to Nagashima Aiseien Sanatorium from Japan Proper, and the bridge was completed in 1988. It was a step toward lessening leprosy stigma.
