= Mieko Kamiya =

Japanese physician and psychiatrist (1914–1979)

- Born: Mieko Maeda (前田 美恵子); 12 January 1914; Okayama, Japan
- Died: 22 October 1979 (aged 65)
- Occupations: psychiatrist, author and translator
- Spouse: Noburo Kamiya (神谷 宣郎)
- Children: Two sons; Ritsu Kamiya (神谷 律) and Toru Kamiya (神谷 徹)
- Relatives: Tamon Maeda (前田 多門) (father), Fusako Maeda (mother), Yoichi Maeda (前田 陽一) (brother) and Masaru Ibuka (brother in law)
- Writing career
- Notable work: "On the meaning of life" 1966

Mieko Kamiya (神谷 美恵子, Kamiya Mieko; January 12, 1914 – October 22, 1979) was a Japanese psychiatrist who treated leprosy patients at Nagashima Aiseien Sanatorium. She was known for translating books on philosophy. She worked as a medical doctor in the Department of Psychiatry at Tokyo University following World War II. She was said to have greatly helped the Ministry of Education and the General Headquarters, where the Supreme Commander of the Allied Powers stayed, in her role as an English-speaking secretary, and served as an adviser to Empress Michiko. She wrote many books as a highly educated, multi-lingual person; one of her books, titled On the Meaning of Life (ikigai ni tsuite in Japanese), based on her experiences with leprosy patients, attracted many readers.

== Life ==
=== Childhood ===
Mieko Kamiya was born as the second child and the first daughter of five children of Tamon Maeda and Fusako Maeda. Tamon, a son of an Osaka merchant, was the prewar Japanese ambassador to the International Labour Organization and postwar Minister of Education. He became a Christian under the influence of Kanzo Uchimura.

Fusako, a daughter of a raw silk trader in Gunma, received a scholarship for the five years at the girls' high school of Friends School (Japan) in Tokyo that had been established by the Religious Society of Friends (Quakers). Fusako had an English and Christian education there. Fusako was introduced to Tamon by Inazo Nitobe and was married to him in 1910.

The family moved to Nagasaki and in 1920, Tamon became a deputy mayor of Tokyo. In 1921 he was appointed the Japanese representative to the International Labour Organization (ILO) at Geneva, Switzerland, where Inazo Nitobe worked as one of the Under-Secretaries General of the League of Nations. Kamiya had started to study English in the second grade at Sacred Heart School in Tokyo from 1921. The family could speak English when they arrived in Geneva.

Kamiya was educated at the Jean-Jacques Rousseau Institute (in French: Académie De Genève or Institut Jean-Jacques Rousseau), when Jean Piaget, a developmental psychologist and philosopher known for his epistemological studies with children, was the principal. From 1924, she studied at the junior high school of the International School of Geneva (in French: Ecole Internationale de Genève). She later wrote that in reading and writing, French was most easy.

In 1926, the family returned to Tokyo. Kamiya entered the Juyu Gakuen, but changed her school within a few months to the Girls' High School of Seijo Gakuen (it now has a higher education department; Seijo University).

=== Higher education ===
In 1932, Kamiya entered the Tsuda College. In 1934, she happened to visit Tama Zenshoen Sanatorium as an organist accompanying a missionary. She was deeply impressed with leprosy patients there and felt that she should someday work for them. At that time, leprosy was an incurable disease, and all the people around her were against her becoming a physician. In 1935, she entered the College of the same school. She contracted tuberculosis, and while she was under treatment for the disease, she studied by herself classical literature in many languages, including Italian, French, German, and Greek. Her favorite was Marcus Aurelius's book which she translated into Japanese later. Her tuberculosis cleared with pneumothorax therapy.

In 1938, in view of the worsening US-Japan relations, Japan set up a Japan Culture Center in New York, and her father, who was one of the editorial writers of the Newspaper Asahi Shimbun, was appointed as its head and the family moved to New York, except her elder brother, Yoichi Maeda, who lived in Paris. Kamiya began to study Greek literature at the Graduate School of Columbia University and lived with her family in Scarsdale, New York. After her health condition improved, Kamiya studied at Bryn Mawr College from February to the end of June 1939. She met Masa Uraguchi, who was a graduate student of botany at Philadelphia University and who became her lifetime best friend. She also met Wilhelm Sollmann, who was a German journalist, politician, and Interior Minister of the Weimar Republic. Kamiya had a close relationship with Mr. and Mrs. Sollmann until June 16, 1939. Kamiya also had a close relationship with Caroline C. Graveson, an English psychologist. When Graveson was leaving the United States, she said to Kamiya, "I predict your future. You'll be an author after you graduate from three M (Medicine, Marriage and Motherhood)."

=== Medicine ===
In 1940, Kamiya began to study medicine with the approval of her father, at the premedical course of Columbia University. In fear of the coming war, in 1941, she returned to Japan and entered Tokyo Women's Medical University. Her father returned to Japan after the beginning of the US-Japan war in an exchange ship. In October 1942, she visited Masao Oota or Mokutaro Kinoshita who was an authority on leprosy research at Tokyo University and visited Nagashima Aiseien Sanatorium and spent 12 days there. She met Kensuke Mitsuda and other staff and reconfirmed her interest in leprosy patients.

In the fall of 1944, she graduated from the medical school and entered the department of psychiatry of Tokyo University She was interested in psychiatry because one of her friends developed schizophrenia. In May 1945, her house burned down and she had to stay in the University treating patients.

=== After the war ===
After Japan's defeat in World War II, her father was appointed Minister of Education, and Kamiya was asked to become a secretary. She could speak fluent English and translated many papers. Her work continued after her father resigned in January 1946. In May, she returned to Tokyo University and helped to examine Shūmei Ōkawa who was a prisoner of the International Military Tribunal for the Far East.

In May 1946, she married Noburoh Kamiya, an instructor in botanical research at Tokyo University. In 1949, he was appointed Professor at Osaka University and their family moved to Osaka. She translated Marcus Aurelius Antoninus's book, which was published. Her husband was invited to teach at the University of Pennsylvania where he had studied, but she and their two children remained in Osaka. She earned money for living expenses for their children, who had contracted tuberculosis, by teaching French.

In 1951, her family moved to Ashiya. In 1957, she started her studies in psychiatry at Nagashima Aiseien Sanatorium. She earned her Ph.D. in 1960. In the same year, she became a professor at Kobe College and in 1963, also a professor at her alma mater Tsuda College. She taught not only psychiatry but also French literature. In 1965, she became chief psychiatrist at Nagashima Aiseien Sanatorium. Her unique studies included a visit to Virginia Woolf's husband and also to Michel Foucault in 1966. She published a book, "On the Meaning of Life (ikigai ni tsuite)".

=== Death ===
Kamiya died on October 12, 1979, from heart disease at age 65.

== On the meaning of life (ikigai) ==
Kamiya's best known work is described in the Japanese Wikipedia article On the meaning of life (ikigai).

According to Mieko Kamiya, the Japanese word ikigai means two things: the object itself and the feeling of the one who feels ikigai. The latter may also be called ikigai-kan (ikigai feeling). When a person considers what their ikigai is, they are likely to consider the following questions.

1. What is my existence for? Is it for someone?
2. What is the purpose of my existence? If there is any, am I faithful to it?

Ikigai may be felt most when what a person wants to do is also their duty, when the answers to questions 1 and 2 are the same. However, there are people whose ikigai differs from what they do to make a living. In trying to forcibly match these, they may become nervous, may develop reactive depression, or even commit suicide.

Kamiya stated that those who have firm ikigai would be those who realize their own mission, or purpose in life, and who are deliberately progressing toward their goals. They are usually not distinguished persons; they may be teachers at secondary schools, or those engaged in special education, or those working in hospitals in remote areas. If they are too busy or are otherwise unable to be faithful to what they should be, this spoils their ikigai most. What is important is pursuing their purpose, not whether or not they accomplish their goal. They will be satisfied even if they die if they are on the road to the accomplishments; but if they are not faithful, they cannot die satisfied.

According to Kamiya, when a person discovers a new theme for their existence, this theme should be in line with their true nature. The decision is very important, and if there is trouble in the decision, neurosis, or a pseudo-way of life, or even suicide may result. A new theme of life may be related to the former one, or may be a totally different one. An example might be the change from love for a human to love for God. This change in the theme of existence may be referred to as replacement of passion. Paul Gauguin may be cited as someone who experienced this, as he started his career as a stockbroker, but went into drawing art at the age of 35.

According to Kamiya, the fundamental role of religion is to give a person unified standards of value, or ikigai (meaning of life).

== Works translated into Japanese ==
- Marcus Aurelius: Meditations (Τὰ εἰς ἑαυτόν, Ta eis heauton), 1956.
- Gregory Zilboorg: A history of medical psychiatry, 1958.
- Michel Foucault: Naissance de la clinique maladie mentale et psychologie, 1969.
- Michel Foucault: Maladie mentale et personnalité, 1970.
- Virginia Woolf: Diaries of a writer, 1999.
- Khalil Gibran: The poems of Khalil Gibran, 2003.

== Pubmed ==
- Virginia Woolf. An outline of a study on her personality, illness and work. Kamiya M. Confin Psychiatr. 1965;8(3):189-205.
- The existence of a man placed in a limitsituation. An anthropological analysis of a paranoid case in a leprosarium. Kamiya M. Confin Psychiatr. 1963;6:15-52.
- Psychiatric studies on leprosy. Kamiya M. Folia Psychiatr Neurol Jpn. 1959 Jul;13:143-73.
