= Noboru Ogasawara =

- Born: July 10, 1888; Ama, Aichi, Empire of Japan
- Died: December 12, 1970 (aged 82)
- Occupations: Physician, Assistant Professor at Kyoto University (1941 - 1948)
- Known for: His view was that leprosy was not incurable and diathesis was an important factor and he met opposition

Noboru Ogasawara (小笠原 登, Ogasawara Noboru; July 10, 1888 – December 12, 1970) was a Japanese physician (dermatologist) specializing in leprosy. He was an assistant professor at the Department of Kyoto Imperial University. He insisted that leprosy was not incurable and diathesis was an important factor in the development of leprosy. He was against strict segregation of leprosy patients and met strong opposition at a Congress of leprosy.

== Life ==
He was born in Jinmokuji Cho(Ama-shi in 2010), Aichi Prefecture on July 10, 1888. After graduating from Kyoto Imperial University, he studied pharmacology, and later dermatology. In 1926, he started the treatment of leprosy, and became the head of leprosy section in 1938. He became assistant professor in 1941. He treated many patients there on an outpatient basis. In 1948 he worked at Toyohashi Hospital. Between 1957 and 1966, he worked at Amami Wakoen Sanatorium, in Amami Ōshima, Kagoshima Prefecture. He died on December 12, 1970, at his native town.

== Three superstitions concerning leprosy ==
He wrote many papers and this was a representative paper.

- There are three superstitions concerning leprosy and each has its reasons. The first superstition is it is incurable. This is because if the disease progresses to a some degree, it leaves deformities, never to become normal in appearance. I recently heard that they will form a leprosy prevention society and will give the patients happy recreations and happy life, and this is a project based on the incurability of leprosy. Religious superstitions are disturbing our treatment of leprosy.
- The second superstition is that leprosy is a transmittable disease. We must learn that diathesis is important in the development of leprosy, since it is transmittable to people with a certain diathesis.
- The third superstition is that leprosy is a vicious infection. This disease has been present from the early times of Japanese history, but the infected people have been so minimal, revealing that its infectivity is very mild.

== Heated debate in newspapers and at a congress of leprosy ==
In 1941, he made his opinions public in a newspaper called Chugai Nippou, and heated debate followed in the newspaper and Asahi Newspaper. At that time, the strict segregation policy was being taken by the state, and the "no leprosy patients in our prefecture" movement was in progress. Hiroshi Hayata, Hosaku Sakurai, both of the Kensuke Mitsuda school, attacked him. On November 14 and 15, there was heated debate between Ogasawara and scholars of the Mitsuda school. His speech was interrupted by a chairperson who stated Ogasawara admitted that leprosy was an infectious disease.

== In Amami Ōshima ==
In 1956, he went to Amami Wakoen Sanatorium, a leprosy sanatorium on Amami Ōshima. He listened to the complaints of leprosy patients, and studied kanpo or traditional Chinese medicine.
