= Kazuo Saikawa =

- Born: June 7, 1918; Tokyo
- Died: July 30, 2007 (aged 89)
- Occupations: Physician, Director of Okinawa Airakuen Sanatorium
- Known for: Concerning leprosy policy, he was against segregation and worked in Taiwan and Okinawa against his teacher Kensuke Mitsuda. In 2001, he testified to the unconstitutionality of the leprosy prevention law.

Kazuo Saikawa (犀川 一夫, Saikawa Kazuo; June 7, 1918 – July 30, 2007) was a Japanese physician, who contributed to the treatment of leprosy and to the administration of leprosy policy in Japan. Concerning the segregation policy of leprosy patients, he was against Kensuke Mitsuda and worked in Taiwan and Okinawa.

== Life ==
- He was born in Tokyo in 1918, and graduated from Tokyo Jikeikai University, now Jikei University School of Medicine in 1944. In 1944 he started to work at Nagashima Aiseien Sanatorium under Kensuke Mitsuda. In a short time he worked as army officer in China. In 1946, he returned to Nagashima Aiseien Sanatorium and studied pathology and treatment trial with promin, the wonder drug of leprosy. In 1960, he was appointed medical doctor at the Taiwan Leprosy Saving Association. In 1964, WHO leprosy specialist in West Pacific Area. In 1971, Ryukyu Government Airakuen Sanatorium director. While Okinawa was returned to Japan, he made the outpatient treatment of leprosy patients to continue only in Okinawa. 1972–1987, Okinawa Airakuen Sanatorium director. 1978, the president of the Leprosy Congress in Okinawa. Received the Sakurane Award for his immunologic studies of leprosy in Okinawa. 2001, he testified to the unconstitutionality of the leprosy prevention law. In 2007. he died in Tokyo.

== 1953 Lucknow Conference ==
- Saikawa attended the 1953 Lucknow Conference, in India as the only one observer from Japan. It was a conference for leprosy management in the days when leprosy could be cured. Kensuke Mitsuda asked Saikawa for his questions since many noted scholars attended it, including R.G.Cochrane and Dharmendra, with Mitsuda's atlas of pathology of atlas for distribution. They were of the opinion that promin could cure leprosy; if not, new chemicals may be found. Kensuke Mitsuda thought that Japan was rich in the nodular type and they could not endure leprosy stigma if patients were discharged into the society.

== Books written and edited ==
- Papers on leprosy written in Okinawa(1979), Naha
- Wounds in leprosy(1982), Naha
- The gate is open(1989), Misuzu Shobo, Tokyo
- Leprosy in the Bible(1994), Shikyo Shuppansha, Tokyo
- Leprosy medicine is my road(1996), Iwanami Shoten, Tokyo
- Leprosy in Chinese classics(1998), Naha
- The history of leprosy administration (1999), Naha

== Papers ==
- Immunological studies of leprosy in Okinawa, part 1, New patients, Repura, 43, 53–62,1974.
- part 2, Geographical distribution, Repura 44,150-162,1975.
- part 3, Remote islands, Repura 46,1-7, 1977.
- part 4, Leprosy in cities, Repura 46, 8–13, 1977.
- There were many other papers by Saikawa.

== Criticisms ==
Yutaka Fujino criticized Saikawa for his warm evaluation of Kensuke Mitsuda who was a stubborn leprosy patient segregationalist. Saikawa also criticized Mitsuda's testimony before the Welfare Committee of the House of Councillors.
