= Chujo =

Chujo may refer to:

- Chujō-ryū (中条流), a koryū martial art founded in the 14th century by Chujō Nagahide
- Chūjō-hime (中将姫, Chūjō-hime?, 753?–781?), a daughter of the court noble Fujiwara no Toyonari who escaped persecution at the hands of her stepmother by becoming a nun at the Taima-dera in Nara

== People with the surname ==
- Chūjō Suketoshi (中條 資俊?, 1872–1947), Japanese physician
- Michio Chûjô (中條道夫, 1908–2004), Japanese entomologist
- Yasuharu Chujo (中条 泰治), Japanese Paralympic swimmer
