= Mosuke Murata =

Japanese dermatologist

Mosuke Murata (村田 茂助, Murata Mosuke) was a Japanese dermatologist and was the designator of erythema nodosum leprosum (ENL)(1912), the type 2 lepra reaction.

== Life and works ==
Mosuke Murata joined the Zensho Byoin, now Tama Zenshoen Sanatorium in 1909. The chief dermatologist was Kensuke Mitsuda and there was another doctor Chin. Murata belonged to the surgery section, and studied leprosy. He was known for naming a hot nodule of leprosy, erythema nodosum leprosum (ENL). There was need to differentiate it from other types of erythema nodosum, which is usually seen in the lower parts of the body. In his paper, he thanked Kensuke Mitsuda for allowing him to study a total of 67 cases. After writing papers, he went into private practice in 1914.

== Erythema Nodosum Leprosum ==
Erythema nodosum leprosum is one of the most frequently used terms in the science of leprosy. It is an immune-mediated complication of leprosy presenting with inflammatory skin nodules. Immune complex production and deposition as well as complement activation have long been regarded as the principal etiology of ENL. ENL is characterised by an inflammatory infiltrate of neutrophils with vasculitis. There is deposition of immune complexes and complement together with Mycobacterium leprae antigens in the skin.

== Term's origin ==
William Jopling wanted to know who named this condition erythema nodosum leprosum, and asked every visitor to his Jordan Hospital, a leprosy hospital (1950–1967) near London. Yoshinobu Hayashi, the director of Tama Zenshoen Sanatorium visited the hospital and brought the information.

== Other works ==
- Mitsuda K, Murata M: On the serum reactions in leprosy. Jpn J Dermatol Urol 11,7(number).1911.
- Murata M: Leprosy patients in Kusatsu Town. Jpn J Dermatol Urol 11,17,1911.
- Murata M:Specific reactive substances in leprosy exudate. Jpn J Dermatol Urol 12,9,1912.
- Murata M:Leprosy bacilli in vesicles and histological studies on smallpox vaccine vesicles. Jpn J Dermatol Urol 13,6,1913.
- Murata M:Diagnostic criteria of leprosy in childhood. Kinsei Igaku, Volume 2, Number 1.
