= Mamoru Uchida =

- Born: 1900; Kikuchi District Kumamoto Prefecture, Japan
- Died: 1982 (aged 81–82)
- Occupations: Physician at Kikuchi Keifuen Sanatorium, Nagashima Aiseien Sanatorium, Matsuoka Hoyoen Sanatorium, Professor of social welfare at Kumamoto Junior College
- Known for: Physician (Ophthalmologist) specializing in leprosy, Teacher of tanka to leprosy patients (In this case his name was Morito Uchida), Collection of literature in the history of leprosy presented to Kumamoto Prefectural Library (Uchida library)

Mamoru Uchida (内田 守, Uchida Mamoru; June 10, 1900 – 1982) was an ophthalmologist who worked for leprosy patients at Kyushu Sanatorium (Kikuchi Keifuen Sanatorium), Nagashima Aiseien Sanatorium, and Matsuoka Hoyoen Sanatorium. He taught leprosy patients tanka, in these sanatoriums. Later, he studied social welfare as a professor at Kumamoto Junior College. He extensively studied the history of leprosy, and presented many documents to the Kumamoto Prefectural Library as Uchida Library; 338 items were shown at an exhibition of Hansen's disease and literature in 2003.

== Pseudonym ==
He used the name "Morito Uchida (内田 守人)" in literature.

== Biography ==
In 1900, he was born in Kikuchi District, Kumamoto Prefecture. He graduated from Kumamoto Medical School in 1924 and entered the Kyushu Sanatorium. In 1934, he became a Ph.D. for his study on murine leprosy. He found a large house where 23% of mice were infected with murine leprosy. He studied leprosy patients around the Honmyoji temple. In three sanatoriums, he taught tanka which consists of five units (often treated as separate lines when Romanized or translated). He helped many tanka poets in compiling their tanka books.

After the war, he returned to Kumamoto and in 1950, became a professor at Kumamoto Junior College. He studied social welfare and wrote several books. He was the president of the 1965 Congress of social welfare association. He died in 1982.

== Tanka ==
Uchida found that patients with leprosy who led miserable life had found hopes and pleasure in making tanka. He helped many tanka poets in compiling their tanka books. And the books he wrote and complied amounted to 40 books.

== Medical achievements ==
He wrote 34 medical papers in Japanese.

- He obtained his Ph.D. on his studies on eye diseases of mice infected with murine leprosy.
- Eye diseases in murine leprosy. Report 1-4. (1932)(1933). Uchida M. 3-4, 4-3.
- He studied leprosy patients in Honmyoji temple.
- He insisted that the popularization of water supply service was effective in reducing leprosy.

== Books ==
He wrote many books in Japanese, recorded in the Japanese version of Wikipedia.

- Mitsuda Kensuke
- A history of welfare activities in Kumamoto Prefecture
- A history of welfare activities in Kyushu
- Yukarino Minoru o Machite (1976) edited by Mamoru Uchida. Riddell and Wright Memorial Home for the Aged. Kumamoto. (410 pages).

== Honors ==
- In 1971, he was given the Order of the Sacred Treasure, 4th Class, for the administration of social welfare and for education.

== Criticism ==
- He was so active in everything, so that they said "Uchida pollutions".
