= Ryumyo Tsunawaki =

Japanese Buddhist monk (1876–1970)

Ryūmyō Tsunawaki
- Born: January 24, 1876; Munakata, Fukuoka Prefecture
- Died: December 5, 1970 (aged 94)
- Occupation: Nichiren Buddhism priest
- Known for: Establishment of a leper hospital Minobu Jinkyo-en(1906 -) with his own money

Ryūmyō Tsunawaki (綱脇龍妙, Tsunawaki Ryūmyō) (January 24, 1876 – December 5, 1970) was a Japanese Buddhist priest who established a leprosy hospital Minobu Jinkyo-en, in Minobu-cho, Yamanashi-ken, Japan in 1906.

== Early life ==
He was born on January 24, 1876, in Fukuoka-ken. His parents were farmers. After his tuberculosis cleared miraculously at the end of his primary school days, he determined to become a priest. He attended several temples and then a school "Tetsugakkan" (now "Toyo University”) and studied philosophy. He happened to visit the Kuonji Temple, the center of Nichiren Buddhism in Yamanashi-ken. There he witnessed a group of miserable leprosy patients living in the dry riverbed and decided to save them. His wife Sada was surprised to hear his determination, but cooperated with him for many years.

== Minobu Jinkyoen Hospital ==
The Minobu Junkyoen Hospital started in 1906. Prior to the start he visited the Interior Ministry of the Japanese government, where he was encouraged to go, while he was told that the government would not be involved in 10 to 15 years. Contrary to this statement, the government started five leprosy sanatoriums three years later. The Kuonji Temple also helped him. For funding, he started a peculiar donation system, saving 1 rin a day, which was 3 sen a month, equivalent to 1 yen a year, and for 100,000 people. For the running of private leprosy hospitals, the financial system differed greatly; Hannah Riddell relied on donation from England and rich families, Cornwall Legh was from her fortune.

== His papers ==
- He wrote many articles, chiefly concerning his religion.
  - "Leprosy can be eliminated by this way" was reported at the second leprosy meeting by Osaka Prefecture in 1929. Although statistics were taken by policemen, the number of leprosy patients were decreasing. Those who have been given a diagnosis of leprosy should be hospitalized as early as possible and be given chaulmoogra oil. They will surely improve.
  - "The Religions and Saving Leprosy Patients", I have seen many cases who have discharged; some became soldiers, or housewives. I believe that leprosy, even in the second stage, can be cured.
    - These papers were written before the promin age.

== Branch hospital in Fukuoka ==
In 1930, Tsunawaki accepted a hospital "Ikunomatsubara Ryoyoin" of Motoji Tanaka which was in trouble financially and made it a branch hospital. Dr. Hayata, his nephew, worked there In 1942, it was given to the Army and was made a tuberculosis sanatorium. The patients were transferred to Hoshizuka Keiaien.

== Episodes ==
Like Father Damien, out of necessity, he amputated a leg of a patient after learning from Kensuke Mitsuda. He visited Sotojima Hoyoen Sanatorium soon after a flood in 1934, attended the opening ceremony of Nagashima Aiseien Sanatorium, visited Ooshima Seishoen. He attended the Congress of Japanese Leprosy Association. A photograph was left of him not in usual Buddhist uniform but in a suit with a necktie in 1935.

== Michi Tsunawaki, his daughter ==
Michi Tsunawaki, his only daughter, helped with his father and mother, and became the director of the hospital when Ryumyo died in 1970. She was married to a doctor who helped them but died a few years later. She again was married to another doctor who also helped with them but later died. The Hospital was closed in 1992, and the patients were transferred to Tama Zenshoen Sanatorium.

== Criticisms ==
- The leprosy problem verification project condemned that the religious people cooperated with the segregation policy of the Government, and stressed too much the glorification of the Imperial Family. Making a branch of the Jinkyoen in Fukuoka was to complement the Government leprosy policy.

== Honours ==
- In 1930 he was given the 6th Order of the Sacred Treasure (social contributor)
- In 1976 he was given the 3rd Order of the Sacred Treasure at his death
