= National Hansen's Disease Museum =

National Hansen's Disease Museum may refer to:

- U.S. National Hansen's Disease Museum, within the Carville Historic District
- National Hansen's Disease Museum (Japan)
