= Shigetaka =

- Gender: Male

Origin
- Origin: Japanese
- Meaning: Different meanings depending on the kanji used

Shigetaka (written: 重孝, 重昂 or 茂高) is a masculine Japanese given name. Notable people with the name include:

- Okada Shigetaka (岡田 重孝; died 1584), Japanese samurai
- Shigetaka Ōmori (大森 茂高; 1916–1942), Japanese naval aviator
- Shigetaka Sasaki, Canadian judoka
- Shiga Shigetaka (志賀 重昂; 1863–1927), Japanese magazine editor
- Shigetaka Takashima (高島 重孝; 1907–1985), Japanese physicist and medical researcher

== See also ==
- Shigetaka Kashiwagi's Top Water Bassing, a Super Famicom fishing video game
