= Chūjō Suketoshi =

Japanese physician (1872–1947)

Suketoshi Chūjō
- Born: December 7, 1872; Yonezawa, Yamagata Prefecture
- Died: March 3, 1947 (aged 74)
- Occupations: Physician and Director of a leper hospital, Matsuoka Hoyōen Sanatorium, Aomori, Japan
- Known for: Studies on turpentine for the treatment of leprosy

Chūjō Suketoshi (中條 資俊; December 7, 1872 – March 3, 1947) was a Japanese physician, a Hansen's disease researcher, the first director of Matsuoka Hoyoen Sanatorium (1909–1947). He repeatedly reported turpentine spirit preparation he named TR as effective for leprosy.

== Life ==
Suketoshi Chūjō was born on November 7, 1872, at Yonezawa city, in Yamagata Prefecture, Japan. He was qualified as a physician in 1902 and became the chief doctor of Hokubu Hoyoen Sanatorium, now Matsuoka Hoyoen Sanatorium on April 1, 1909, when the sanatorium opened. On April 25, he was appointed by the prefecture as its director. In 1910 he was appointed as the director by the state and he had remained in this position until his death on March 1, 1947. In 1922 and 1923, he studied in Leipzig, Germany under Prof. Hooke on the mast cells in histology and became Ph.D. In 1939, he was the president of the leprosy congress at Aomori.

== Sanatorium administrator ==
This sanatorium was one of the earliest public leprosy sanatoriums in Japan and he paid extraordinary efforts in its administration. In 1928 and 1936, it experienced big burns. He asked for the establishment of another sanatorium in Tohoku area and in 1934, Tohoku Shinseien Sanatorium opened,

== Character ==
He was very kind to patients and was said to be the father of them. He spoke strong Tohoku dialect, but impressed other people such as Kensuke Mitsuda, Keizo Dohi and Rokuro Takano by singing oiwake, a folk song of Tohoku District, without hesitation. He had many episodes.

== Turpentine preparations ==
- As possible remedy for leprosy, especially with coexisting erysipelas, he paid great efforts to the spirit of turpentine, or oil of turpentine, first developed by Klingmuller and he named it TR. He had repeatedly spoken on this between 1928 and 1944, and in 1940 gave a special lecture for 2 hours at the leprosy congress, but in the 1941 Japan Congress of Leprosy, he finally he admitted that TR was inferior to Prontosil, a sulfa compound.

== On the segregation of leprosy patients ==
On 19, 20, December 1919, there was a meeting of related persons on the problems of leprosy. Suetoshi Chujo spoke, "It is idealistic to send leprosy patients to a remote island, but in reality, difficult. I think it is better to send the patients accustomed to life to the remote island, and to send those in the houses to the present sanatoriums for their own money, and send riot persons to a prison island.

== Published papers ==
- On congenital leprosy Saikingaku Zasshi, 193, p771, 1911.
- On congenital leprosy Tohoku Igaku, 8, supplementary num. 1922.
- Tetrodotoxin therapy of leprosy, Saikingaku Zasshi, 197, 153, 1912.
- Moxabusion therapy of leprosy, Tokyo Ijishinshi, 1768,1912.
- Serodiagnosis of leprosy, Report 1, Report 2, Saikingaku Zasshi, 227, 1914.
- Mast cells in histology, Nisshin Igaku, 17,3,457,1927(paper for PH.D)
- Studies on TR, Repura 2,108,1931.
  - He made many studies on TR, or turpentine oil preparations.
- Histologic studies on erythema nodosum leprosum. Repura 4,107,1933.
- Survey of leprosy patients living in towns and villages. Repura 6,156,1935.
  - On the same theme. Ikai Jiho, 2151,2352,1935. ibid.2152, 2406, 1935.
- Ueber die Zuechtung von Tuberkelbazillen aus den Auswuerfen von Leproen. Tohoku J Exp Med 31, 431,1937.
  - There were many other papers.
