= Mosuke =

- Gender: Male

Origin
- Origin: Japanese
- Meaning: Different meanings depending on the kanji used

Mosuke (written: 茂助 or 喪助) is a masculine Japanese given name. Notable people with the name include:

- Horio Mosuke (堀尾 喪助; 1542–1611), Japanese samurai
- Mosuke Murata (村田 茂助), Japanese dermatologist

== Other uses ==
- MoSuke, French restaurant
