= Saikawa =

Saikawa (written: 犀川, 斎川, 西川 or 斉川) is a Japanese surname. Notable people with the surname include:

- Eri Saikawa, American professor
- Hiroto Saikawa (西川 廣人), Japanese businessman, CEO of Nissan
- Kazuo Saikawa (犀川 一夫, 1918–2007), Japanese physician
- Norikatsu Saikawa (斎川 哲克, born 1986), Japanese sport wrestler
- Yusuke Saikawa (斉川 雄介, born 1985), Japanese footballer
