= Suketoshi =

- Gender: Male

Origin
- Origin: Japanese
- Meaning: Different meanings depending on the kanji used

Suketoshi (written: 資俊) is a masculine Japanese given name. Notable people with the name include:

- Chūjō Suketoshi (中條 資俊) (1872–1947), Japanese leprologist
- Matsudaira Suketoshi (松平 資俊) (1660–1723), Japanese daimyō
- Ōta Suketoshi (太田 資俊) (1720–1764), Japanese daimyō
