= Koyama Fukusei Hospital =

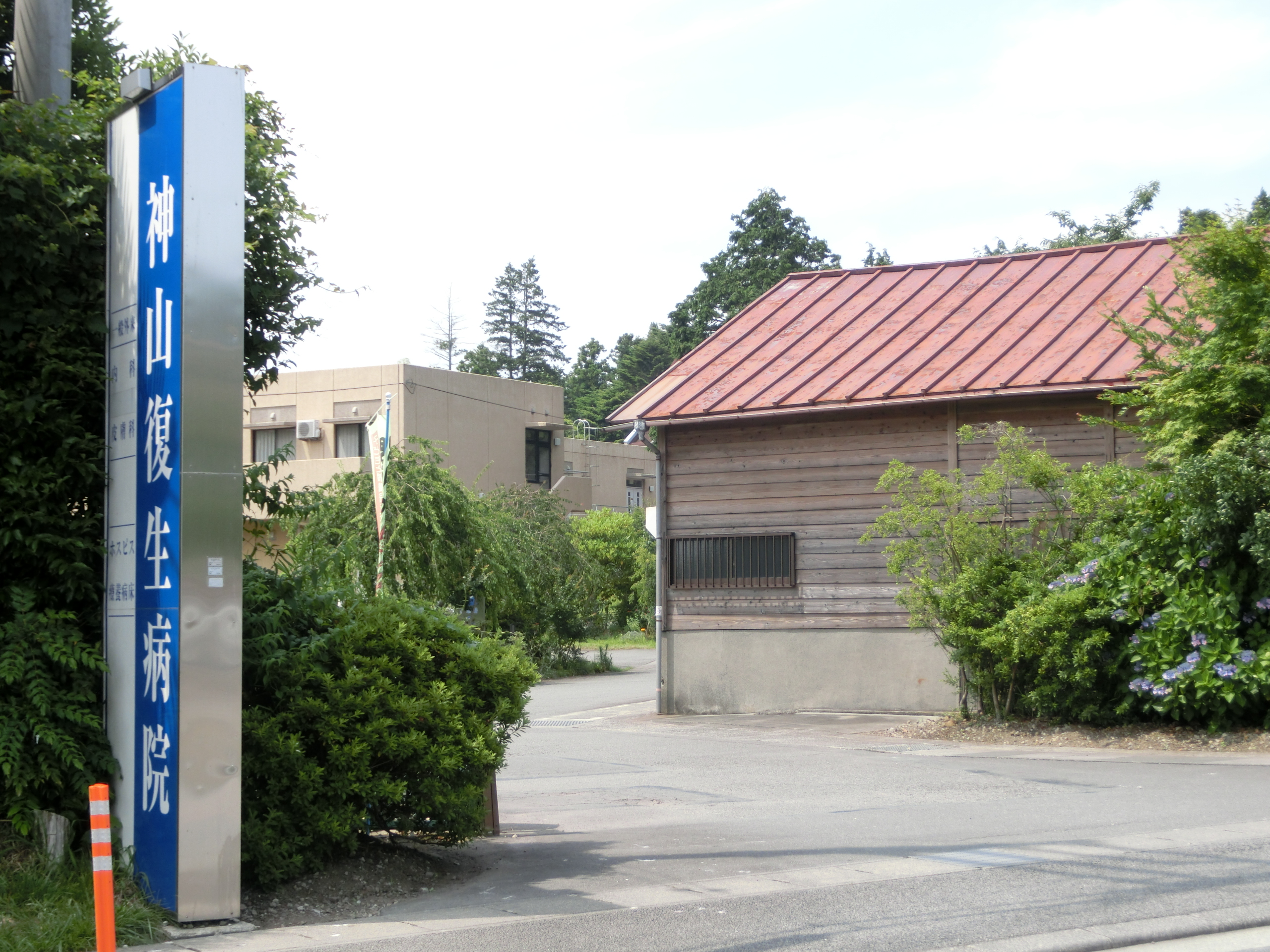
- Koyama Fukusei Hospital

Geography
- Location: Gotemba, Shizuoka, Japan
- Coordinates: 35°14′20.58″N 138°55′22.32″E

Organisation
- Care system: HealthCare of those who had leprosy
- Type: Private hospital run by the juridical foundation Koyama Fukusei Hospital

Services

History
- Opened: May 22, 1889

Links
- Website: www.fukusei.jp
- Lists: Hospitals in Japan

Koyama Fukusei Hospital (神山復生病院, Koyama Fukusei Byōin) is the oldest leprosy hospital in Japan. It was established by the Roman Catholic priest Germain Léger Testevuide of the Paris Foreign Missions Society in 1889, for treating leprosy in Japan and is thereby the oldest lepers' home in Japan. As of 2009, at the time of its closure as a leprosy hospital, there were 8 ex-leprosy residents. This hospital is now open to the general public as a clinic and a hospice for the terminally ill.

== The spelling of the hospital ==
For pronunciation, "Kohyama Fukusei Hospital" and "Kōyama Fukusei Hospital" are more descriptive. But, "Koyama Fukusei Hospital" is considered to be a reliable English spelling.

== History ==
- 1883:Father Germain Léger Testevuide started to visit 5-6 leprosy patients living in a watermill.
- 1886:Father made them to live in a house.
- 1888:Father obtained land for a hospital.
- 1889:May 16, The opening of a hospital was admitted. May 22, the opening day.
- 1891:Father became ill and died in Hong Kong. Father Francois Paulin Vigroux assumed the post of the director.
- 1893:Father Lucien Joseph Jean Augustin Bertrand became the third director. The number of in-patients was 93.
- 1918:Father Drouart de Lézey assumed the post of the fifth director.
- 1923:Yae Ibuka became the first qualified nurse of this hospital.
- 1930:Father Soichi Iwashita became the 6th director.
- 1952:A clinic was opened for citizens.
- 1961:Chief nurse Yae Ibuka received the Florence Nightingale Medal.
- 1989:100th anniversary of this hospital.
- 2006:The oldest building was designated as a Registered Tangible Cultural Properties of Japan since 2011.
- 2009:120th anniversary of this hospital.

== Fukusei Memorial Hall ==
This building was built in 1897 and had been used until 2002 as the main building of the hospital. It houses various memorial items such as chronological tables, photographs of directors, items of patients (items necessary for living, recreations, etc.), documents and items concerning the Imperial Family, items of the 6th director Father Sohichi Iwashita and the first chief nurse Yae Ibuka.

== Opinions of Father Lézey ==
- In 1919, there was a meeting of directors of sanatoriums and the segregation into an island was discussed. Father Lézey stated "The treatment of patients on Molokai was very bad leading to riots. The situation improved by Father Damien. Leprosy patients were to be sympathized, and they do not fear anything. How do you govern them ? In my sanatorium, there are 72 patients, and they are brothers. I am their father. There are no quarrels. This is because of our religion. I am against the segregation into an island.
- On the sex segregation. "As Hannah Riddell said, I am in favor of her opinion. It is very hard to prohibit marriage, but for the nation where leprosy patients are on the increase, they should not marry."

== Father Iwashita met Hannah Riddell ==
Father Iwashita met Hannah Riddell in 1931 and wrote the following comments concerning her:

"I do not know how Riddell herself thinks, but observing her life story, I must admit a great mission has been achieved, regardless of whether she was aware or not. God selected Riddell and awakened the consciousness of people of Japan concerning leprosy problems. ""
