= Koh Yasuda =

Japanese ophthalmologist

- Born: 1907; Wakayama Prefecture, Japan
- Died: 1943 (aged 35–36)
- Occupation: Physician (Ophthalmologist)
- Known for: Appointed the first director of a leper hospital, now Amami Wakoen Sanatorium, Kagoshima Prefecture, Japan and he was drafted and died in war before starting the sanatorium

Koh Yasuda (保田 耕, Yasuda Kō; 1907 - September 7, 1943) or Kō Yasuda was a Japanese ophthalmologist who became the first director of Amami Wakoen Sanatorium, a leprosy sanatorium in Amami Ōshima, Kagoshima Prefecture, Japan. He was drafted into military service and died in China in 1943.

== Life ==
He was born in 1907 in Wakayama Prefecture and graduated from Osaka University and qualified as a physician in 1932. He worked at Sotojima Hoyoen and Oku-Komyo-En Sanatorium. In April 1943, he was appointed to be a doctor soldier with the first director of Amami Wakoen Sanatorium. In August 1943, he was drafted and died on September 7, 1943, in China during war.

== Works ==
- The following works were presented in the Congresses of the Japanese Leprosy Association.
- Statistics of eye disease in leprosy patients, the eyesight of leprosy patients and the effect of trachoma, Reported at 1933 Japanese Leprosy Congress.
- Effects of aurothio.natrium on eye disease. 1934 Japanese Leprosy Congress.
- Puncture of anterior chamber in acute leprous inflammation. 1935 Japanese Leprosy Congress.
- Detection of leprosy bacilli in chamber fluid. 1936 Japanese Leprosy Congress
- Treatment of ulcer of cornea. 1937 Japanese Leprosy Congress.
- Intraocular pressure in leprosy patients. 1939 Japanese Leprosy Congress.
- Color blindness seen in a leprosy patient. 1941 Japanese Leprosy Congress.

== On the draft ==
Yasuda was drafted before the completion of Amami Wakoen Sanatorium. It was recorded that the Ministry of Army forgot the previous agreement by the Ministries of Army and Welfare that the first director of the sanatorium should not be drafted into military service.
