= Kate Youngman =

American missionary

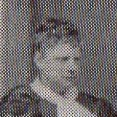
- Youngman in 1880
- Born: December 17, 1841; Kingston, New York
- Died: September 29, 1910 (aged 68)
- Occupation: Missionary (American Presbyterian Church)
- Known for: Establishment of Kohzensha, a Christian organization and a leper hospital Ihaien(1894–1942), in Meguro, Tokyo.

Kate M. Youngman (December 17, 1841 – September 29, 1910) was an American missionary who established the Ihaien leprosy hospital in Tokyo, Japan, in 1894. It was active from 1894 until 1942.

== History ==
Youngman was born in Kingston, New York, on December 17, 1841. Her mother died when she was 14 and her father died when she was 17. Her fiancé died in the American Civil War when she was 21. She was dispatched to Japan as a missionary in 1873 by the American Presbyterian Church, when the freedom of faith was ascertained in Japan. She worked as a teacher and missionary at Shin-ei Girls' School. In 1877, she established the "Kohzensha", a Christian organization which was dedicated to the propagation of Christianity, education, and charity. In 1892, Youngman found that a Christian developed leprosy and escaped from a Catholic leprosy hospital because of difference of religion. Youngman proposed that another facility be made for leprosy patients to live without fear of spiritual conflict, but The Presbyterian Church rejected her proposal for funding the project. However, in 1894, the Mission to Lepers began funding her organization. In October 1894, Ihaien was started on 4,950 square meters of land at Meguro, Tokyo. Kitasato Shibasaburō proposed to send doctors and supplies if Ihaien would change to a hospital which was accomplished in 1899.

Youngman herself was reluctant to the hospitalization of the organization, and lost interest in the project. In 1910, she left the Kohzensha and died on September 29, 1910, after 12 days in bed. Her monument is in Somei, Tokyo.

== Ihaien Hospital ==
The original idea of the Ihaien was to house people with leprosy and let them live with spiritual comfort. Kitasato Shibasaburo, a famous doctor at the Institute of Infectious Diseases belonging to the Interior Ministry, sent a doctor and also patients in 1899 when it was changed to a hospital. The hospital's patients numbered about 50 and were also quite poor. In addition to them, the government sent patients called Seikan (government patients) which sometimes led to strife between them and the already established patients. The Ihaien Hospital was closed in 1942 because of financial difficulties, and 55 patients were transferred to Tama Zenshoen Sanatorium.
