= Tamio Hōjō =

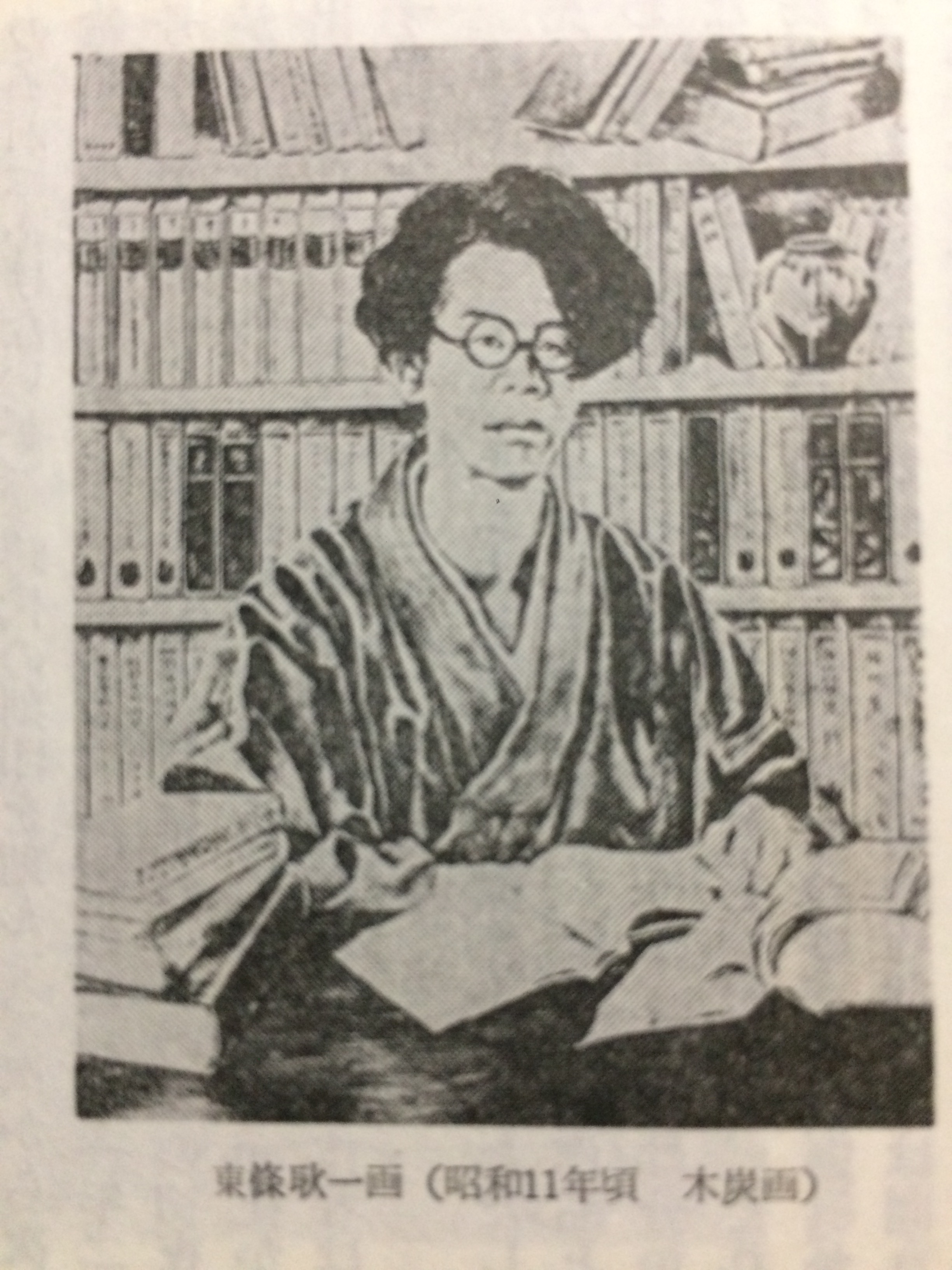
Tamio Hōjō in 1936

Tamio Hōjō (Japanese: 北條 民雄, Hepburn: Hōjō Tamio) (1914 – 1937) was a Japanese writer. At the age of 19, he was diagnosed with leprosy, entered a hospital where he would be kept in isolation for the rest of his life, and died of the disease three and a half years later. Life's First Night (いのちの初夜, Inochi no Shoya) is his representative work.

== Sources ==
Hōjō's talent was discovered by Yasunari Kawabata, and the two exchanged letters. After Hōjō's death, a complete collection was relatively soon published, with Kawabata helping to compile it. For this reason, although Hōjō's active period was short, his essays, diaries, and letters have been well preserved, providing insight into his life and personality.

However, details about the first half of his life were concealed for a long time. The name Tamio Hōjō was also a pen name. The reason for this was that at the time leprosy was believed to be an incurable contagious disease, which led to a variety of misunderstandings and discrimination. At that time in Japan, it was not uncommon for the families of those who develop the disease to be forced to leave their land. It was also common for patients to be shunned by their families. The only information known about his life before his hospitalization was the years of his birth, marriage, and divorce, as described in notes he himself had written for his complete collection, for a long time.

In July 1970, his friend at the hospital, Ryōji Mitsuoka, wrote the first critical biography. Even in it there were very little about his life before he entered the hospital. There was a question as to how much information should be made public that the author himself had tried to conceal, and that his relatives had also tried to conceal.

While his work had been forgotten for a long time, Hōjō's real name was made public in 2014, 80 years after his death. This revealed details of his early life and literary background. His works were republished in 2020 in the midst of the COVID-19 pandemic.

== As a writer ==
According to his notes he himself wrote for his complete collection, in 1932, at the age of 18, Hōjō married a distant relative, but the following year he noticed that his legs were paralyzed, and so he divorced his wife. In March 1933, he was diagnosed with leprosy. Next month, he went to Tokyo and voluntarily admitted himself to Zensei Hospital (Tama Zenshōen Sanatorium). At the time, this hospital was a facility designed to isolate patients from society for the rest of their lives.

From inside the hospital, Hōjō sent a letter and began corresponding with Yasunari Kawabata, whom he respected. Hōjō sent his work to Kawabata and received criticism. In October 1935, his short novell Old Man Magi (間木老人, Magi rōjin) was published in Bungakukai (『文學界』; lit. 'the world of literature') under his another pen name Gōichi Chichibu (秩父號一). This became his debut work.

In December 1935, Hōjō sent Kawabata a short novel The First Night (最初の一夜, Saisho no Ichiya). This was renamed by Kawabata to Life's First Night (いのちの初夜, Inochi no Shoya) and published in Bungakukai in February 1936. Life's First Night was recognized as an excellent work and won an award. From then on, Hōjō released new works almost every month. However, his health deteriorated and his physical strength weakened. He died in the early morning of December 5, 1937.

== Works ==
His works include nine short stories, sixteen essays, and diaries. Leprosy is a major theme in all of the works. Life's First Night was nominated for the third Akutagawa Prize. Kawabata, who was in charge of selecting the prize, however, while praising the work, told Hōjō in his correspondence that he would not allow him to win the prize. The reason is unclear, but Nakae (2023) speculates that Kawabata may have been concerned that Hōjō's entry into the literary world would diminish the purity of his work.

Life's First Night received a great deal of criticism immediately after its publication. Hideo Kobayashi wrote "This is a rare work. It is more than a work of art; it is literature itself." Mitsuo Nakamura wrote that Hōjō's anguish laid not in enduring the illness but in having to believe that the patient would be resurrected.

== Concealed Early life ==
In 2014, the city of Anan in Tokushima Prefecture has for the first time made public his real name, birthplace, and where he grew up. His real name was Shichijō Kōji (七條 晃司), born in Keijō (Seoul, South Korea, today) in 1914. His mother died soon after Hōjō's birth, whereupon Hōjō and his older brother were sent to live with their maternal grandparents in Anan. There, he grew up in a relatively well-to-do farming household, and although he hated school, he graduated from elementary school and then secondary school.

After his real name was made public, his classmates discovered photographs of him as a boy. He was a boy who loved baseball. Later in his diary he wrote about how he enjoyed playing baseball even while in the sanatorium.

His literary experiences were also revealed. In 1929, at the age of 15, Hojo decided to become a writer after reading a novella by Takiji Kobayashi. He developed an interest in proletarian literature and Marxist thought, and corresponded with Yoshiki Hayama. Publishing his first literary coterie magazine at the age of 18, he was absorbed in reading literary works by Dostoevsky and Yasunari Kawabata. On the other hand, the early symptoms of leprosy were already appearing around this time.
