= Yae Ibuka =

Japanese leper hospital nurse (1897–1989)

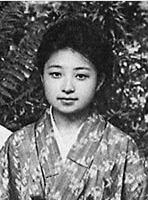
- Yae Ibuka
- Born: 23 October 1897; Taipei, Formosa, Empire of Japan (now Taiwan)
- Died: 15 May 1989 (aged 91); Koyama Fukusei Hospital, Gotemba, Shizuoka
- Occupations: Teacher of English and later nurse
- Known for: misdiagnosis of leprosy influenced her nursing career, treating people with leprosy; Florence Nightingale Medal (1961).

Yae Ibuka (井深八重, Ibuka Yae; October 23, 1897 – May 15, 1989) was a Japanese nurse who worked with patients who had leprosy. She was diagnosed as having leprosy, and hospitalized at Koyama Fukusei Hospital in 1919. It proved a misdiagnosis three years later, but she was deeply impressed by Drouart de Lézey, the director of the hospital, and was determined to work as a nurse with leprosy patients. In 1961, she was awarded the Florence Nightingale Medal.

== The pronunciation of Koyama Fukusei Hospital ==
- "Kohyama Fukusei Hospital" or "Kōyama Fukusei Hospital". Koyama Fukusei Hospital is described in the reference and Koyama Fukusei Hospital

== Life ==
Yae Ibuka was born on 23 October 1897 in Taipei, Formosa (now Taiwan) as a daughter of a congressman, Hikosaburo Ibuka. Her mother left the Ibuka family when her parents divorced when she was 7 years old. She graduated from Doshisha Girls' School (now Doshisha Women's College of Liberal Arts) in 1918.

While she was teaching English in Nagasaki, she developed a skin change, which was diagnosed as a sign of leprosy. She was hospitalized at Koyama Fukusei Hospital without knowing the diagnosis. The diagnosis was shocking to her. Since her disease did not progress, she sought the diagnosis of Prof. Keizo Dohi of Tokyo University in 1922. Leprosy was denied. Observing the director of the hospital, she was determined to work for leprosy patients and became a nurse. In 1923, she became the only qualified nurse at the hospital. She had remained the chief nurse at the hospital until 6 April 1978, when she became the honorary chief nurse. Her dedication to leprosy patients was highly appreciated. She became the first president of Japan Catholic Nurses' Association. She died on 15 May 1989, one day before the 100th anniversary of the Koyama Fukusei Hospital. On May 16, she was given a special award by Princess Takamatsu of Japan.

== Honors ==
- In 1959, she was given the Order of St. Sylvester by Pope John XXIII.
- In 1961, she was given the Florence Nightingale Medal.
- In 1977, she was given the Asahi Social Welfare Award.

== Relatives ==
- Masaru Ibuka of Sony was her remote relative.
