= William Jopling =

British doctor (1911–1997)

- Born: 2 March 1911; Pozzuoli, Naples, Italy
- Died: 21 August 1997 (aged 86)
- Occupations: Physician, director of Jordan Hospital in London (1950–1967)
- Known for: Ridley-Jopling classification of leprosy, textbook Handbook of Leprosy and medical papers including leprosy stigma

William Jopling (2 March 1911 – 21 August 1997) was an Italian-born British leprologist who together with D. S. Ridley proposed the Ridley-Jopling classification of leprosy (1962), and wrote the widely read textbook Handbook of Leprosy, which had a fifth edition. He had a wide understanding of leprosy problems based on his experiences as the director of Jordan Hospital (1950–1967), a leprosy hospital in London, and wrote various articles, including on leprosy stigma.

== Life ==
=== Early life ===
He was born in Pozzuoli, near Naples, Italy, and educated at Norman Court School, New Barnet and Queen Elizabeth's Grammar School for Boys, Barnet. He graduated from London University (St. Barthlomew's Hospital) in 1936 and studied medicine and obstetrics, as an intern, ending as a ship doctor traveling to the Far East.

Later in 1938, he went to Hartley, Southern Rhodesia (now Chegutu, Zimbabwe), Africa, with his wife, and chiefly engaged in medicine and obstetrics. He transferred a patient with leprosy in his government car to a leprosarium and became interested in the disease. During World War II, he went into the volunteer Medical Corps.

In August 1947, he returned to London with his family at age 36 and took postgraduate studies, specializing in tropical medicine. After the war, some of Hansen's disease patients came from other countries, and he took the new post of the director of Jordan Hospital, specializing in leprosy. The number of beds was only 24. After 17 years, it closed and a few patients were transferred to other facilities.

=== The Jordan Hospital (1950–1967) ===
Together with Ridley, he established the Ridley-Jopling classification of leprosy, which is the standard of classification, although the World Health Organization (WHO) added a simple classification of multibacillary leprosy and paucibacillary leprosy for practical reasons. He was interested not only in the classification, but also in leprosy reactions, and he finally found the designator of Erythema Nodosum Leprosum, asking any visitors to his hospital. He remained Consultant in Tropical Medicine at St. John's Hospital for Diseases of the Skin until his retirement. He participated in a multidrug therapy trial in Malta.

== Ridley-Jopling Classification ==
The axis of classification is the degree of Lepromin reaction. Kensuke Mitsuda first reported the lepromin reaction in 1919, which is usually called the Mitsuda reaction. This reaction was completed by Fumio Hayashi.

Ridley-Jopling Classification
Group	Lepromin Reaction	Leprosy Bacilli in Tissue
I(Indeterminate group)	-～+	±～-
TT	2+～3+	±～-
BT	+～2+	±
BB	(-)～±～+	+
BL	-～±	3+
LL	-	4+

== Leprosy stigma ==
Applying Goffman's definition, he explained various instances of leprosy stigma both in Europe and in other parts of the world. The general public has many misconceptions about leprosy; health authorities have launched information campaigns stating that the disease is curable and patients on treatment are noninfectious. Various factors for stigma are present, including religions and laws. Present-day leprosy stigma will disappear with the eradication of leprosy with multidrug therapy.

== Handbook of Leprosy ==
The textbook had been widely available since its first edition in 1971. It has been translated into Spanish and Chinese.

== Comments by others ==
"He seldom initiated research, but the dependability of his clinical judgment made him an invaluable and much sought-after research partner, and for many years he was a central figure in the Hospital for Tropical Disease's leprosy research programme."

== Awards ==
Jopling and Ridley were jointly awarded the Sir Rickard Christophers Medal by the Royal Society of Tropical Medicine and Hygiene in 1994.
