= Suruga Sanatorium =

Coordinates: 35°13′42″N 138°56′21″E

National Suruga Sanatorium

Geography
- Location: 1915 Kōyama, Gotenba, Shizuoka, Japan

Organisation
- Care system: Healthcare of those who had leprosy
- Type: National hospital run by Ministry of Health, Labour and Welfare (Japan)

History
- Opened: 1945

Links
- Website: hosp.go.jp/~suruga2
- Lists: Hospitals in Japan

Suruga Sanatorium (国立駿河療養所) or National Suruga Sanatorium is a national sanatorium for leprosy and ex-leprosy patients situated in Gotemba, Shizuoka, Japan since 1945.

== History ==
After the start of the Second Sino-Japanese War (July 7, 1937- ), wounded soldiers became problematic and Matsuki Miyazaki proposed in 1937 that those who developed leprosy, during military service, should be given treatment and pension in the same degree as those who developed tuberculosis during service.

The following is a timeline of events:

- 1940: Treatment for leprosy in Japanese soldiers was approved.
- 1942: A sanatorium was planned and National Sanatorium Wounded Soldiers' Suruga Sanatorium was established on December 15, 1944.
- December 15, 1944: Sanatorium opened.
- June 10, 1945: The first patient was hospitalized.
- December 1, 1945: The facility became National Suruga Sanatorium.
- April 1996: The 1953 Leprosy Prevention Law was abolished.
- July 1998: The trial for compensation started.
- May 11, 2001: The trial for compensation ruled that the previous Leprosy Prevention was unconstitutional.
- May 25, 2001: The trial for compensation was confirmed. The compensation of 8,000,000 yen to 14,000,000 yen was given to patients depending on the duration of their incarceration.

=== Patients ===
The number of in-patients varied depending on admissions, deaths, escapes and discharges.

Year	Number of in-patients
1945	44
1950	273
1955	436
1960	453
1965	373
1970	344
1975	306
1980	290
1985	251
1990	232
1995	214
1999	188

Year	Number of in-patients
2003	151
2004	141
2005	136
2006	127
2007	119
2008	112

== Space ==
The site covered 364.680 hectares (900 acres). The buildings covered 22.241 hectares (50 acres)

== See also ==
- Leprosy in Japan
