= Amami Wakoen Sanatorium =

Coordinates: 28°23′06″N 129°31′00″E

National Sanatorium Amami Wakoen

Geography
- Location: 1700, Naze Wakomachi Amami, Kagoshima, Japan

Organisation
- Care system: HealthCare of those who had leprosy
- Type: National hospital run by Ministry of Health, Labour and Welfare (Japan)

Services
- Beds: 161(Japanese law on health and medicine in 2008), 70(in-patients)

History
- Founded: 1943

Links
- Website: http://www.hosp.go.jp/~amami/gaiyo.html
- Lists: Hospitals in Japan

Amami Wakōen Sanatorium, or National Sanatorium Amami Wakōen is a sanatorium for leprosy or ex-leprosy patients in Amami-shi, Kagoshima-ken, Japan starting in 1943. In 2008, there were 56 almost healthy residents and their average age was about 80 years.

== History ==
=== Background ===
The sanatorium in Amami Ōshima was the last one of national sanatoriums starting with the Nagashima Aiseien Sanatorium in 1930. There was considerable resistance within the island to the establishment of a sanatorium.

=== Amami Wakoen ===
- Dec 1943:Amami Wakoen was started.
- April 1944:Amami Wakoen was formally established. The first in-patients were 19.
- Sep 1944: The first director, Dr. Koh Yasuda died in a battle in China.
- Jun 1945: Employee Yoshinosuke Yanagida was killed by shooting from an airplane.
- Feb 2, 1946: Under American occupation.
- Jan 1948: Promin was given by the Catholic Church and was used in 7 patients.
- Dec 1952: Amami was returned to Japan. National Sanatorium Amami Wakoen.
- Apr 1996:The 1953 Leprosy Prevention Law was abolished.
- Jul 1998: The trial for compensation started.
- May 11, 2001: The trial for compensation ruled that the previous Leprosy Prevention was unconstitutional.
- May 25, 2001: The trial for compensation was confirmed. The compensation of 8,000,000 yen to 14,000,000 yen was given to patients depending on the duration of unconstitutional periods.

=== Number of Patients ===
The number of in-patients is the sum of patients which changed not only by the newly diagnosed hospitalized and those who died among in-patients, by other factors such as the number of patients who escaped or were discharged, depending on the condition of the times. Recently they were encouraged to be discharged, but the long period of the segregation policy causing leprosy stigma might influence the number of those who went into the society.

Year	Number of in-patients
1943	8
1944	36
1945	39
1950	271
1955	291
1960	325
1965	313
1970	283
1975	245
1980	214
1985	184
1990	154
2003	76
2008	56

- Since 1996, it has been encouraged for the residents(ex-patients) to leave the sanatorium.

== Bringing up children born to leprosy patients ==
- Children born to Hansen's disease patients in Amami-Oshima, Kagoshima, Japan (2009), Moriyama K et al. Jpn J Leprosy 78, 231-250: from Pubmed Nihon Hansenbyo Gakkai Zasshi. 2009 Sep;78(3):231-50.
- In Japan, in this sanatorium only, patients could give birth to children. In Japanese sanatoriums, marriage was all right, but it was difficult to give birth to their children, and vasectomy and interruption of pregnancy had been conducted. Catholic Joan Matsubara(later secretary of Wako-en), Father Patrick Finn, Kaoru Ohira,(director), outlined how children born to patients would be grown up and made the internal rules of the couples' dormitory. Between 1953 and 1954, children were grown up by Matsubara's family and nurses. And since November 1954, children were brought up at nurseries (First "Children's House", and later at "Naze Engel House") and children between 2 and 3 years went to "White Lily House". The children could meet their parents at times and now they are full-fledged grown-up citizens.

== Outlook for the future ==
- There were 56 residents in 2008 and their mean age was about 80. They hope that they will be cared for by the nation peacefully as long as they live. There have been many opportunities concerning how the sanatorium will remain under the care of the nation. However, there has been no clear vision.
