= Yasuharu Chujo =

Japanese Paralympic swimmer

Medal record

Men's swimming

Representing Japan

Paralympic Games
Gold medal – first place	2000 Sydney	4x100 m medley S11-13

Yasuharu Chujo (中条 泰治, Chūjō Yasuharu) is a Paralympic swimmer from Japan competing mainly in the category S12 events.

Yasuharu competed in the 2000 Summer Paralympics as part of the Japanese swimming team. He was part of the squad that broke the world record in the 4x100 m medley winning the gold medal. Individually he had less success finishing last in his heat of the 200 m medley and 100 m butterfly he also finished last in the final of the 100 m breaststroke and 100 m backstroke.
