= Leprosy stigma =

Strong negative feeling towards a person with leprosy

Leprosy stigma is a type of social stigma, a strong negative feeling towards a person with leprosy relating to their moral status in society. It is also referred to as leprosy-related stigma, leprostigma, and stigma of leprosy. Since ancient times, leprosy instilled the practice of fear and avoidance in many societies because of the associated physical disfigurement and lack of understanding behind its cause. Because of the historical trauma the word leprosy invokes, the disease is now referred to as Hansen's disease, named after Gerhard Armauer Hansen who discovered Mycobacterium leprae, the bacterial agent that causes Hansen's disease. Those who have suffered from Hansen's disease describe the impact of social stigma as far worse than the physical manifestations despite it being only mildly contagious and pharmacologically curable. This sentiment is echoed by Weis and Ramakrishna, who noted that "the impact of the meaning of the disease may be a greater source of suffering than symptoms of the disease".

== Definition of stigma ==
The word stigma originated from the Greeks who used it to "refer to bodily signs designed to expose something unusual and bad about the moral status" of a person. These bodily signs can be thought of as the lesions causing physical deformities in a person's skin in the context of leprosy.

American sociologist Erving Goffman defines stigma as an attribute that is deeply discrediting; a stigmatized individual is one who is not accepted and not accorded the respect and regard of his peers, who is disqualified from full social acceptance. It is associated with 1) physical deformities, such as facial plaques, facial palsy, claw hand deformity or footdrop; 2) blemishes of character, such as are associated with alcoholism, drug addiction, or leprosarium; or 3) race, nation, social class, sexuality and religion that are thought of as second-class by another group. Stigma itself is constructed based on "historical processes, cross-cultural differences, and structural inequalities," which determine social norms.

== History ==
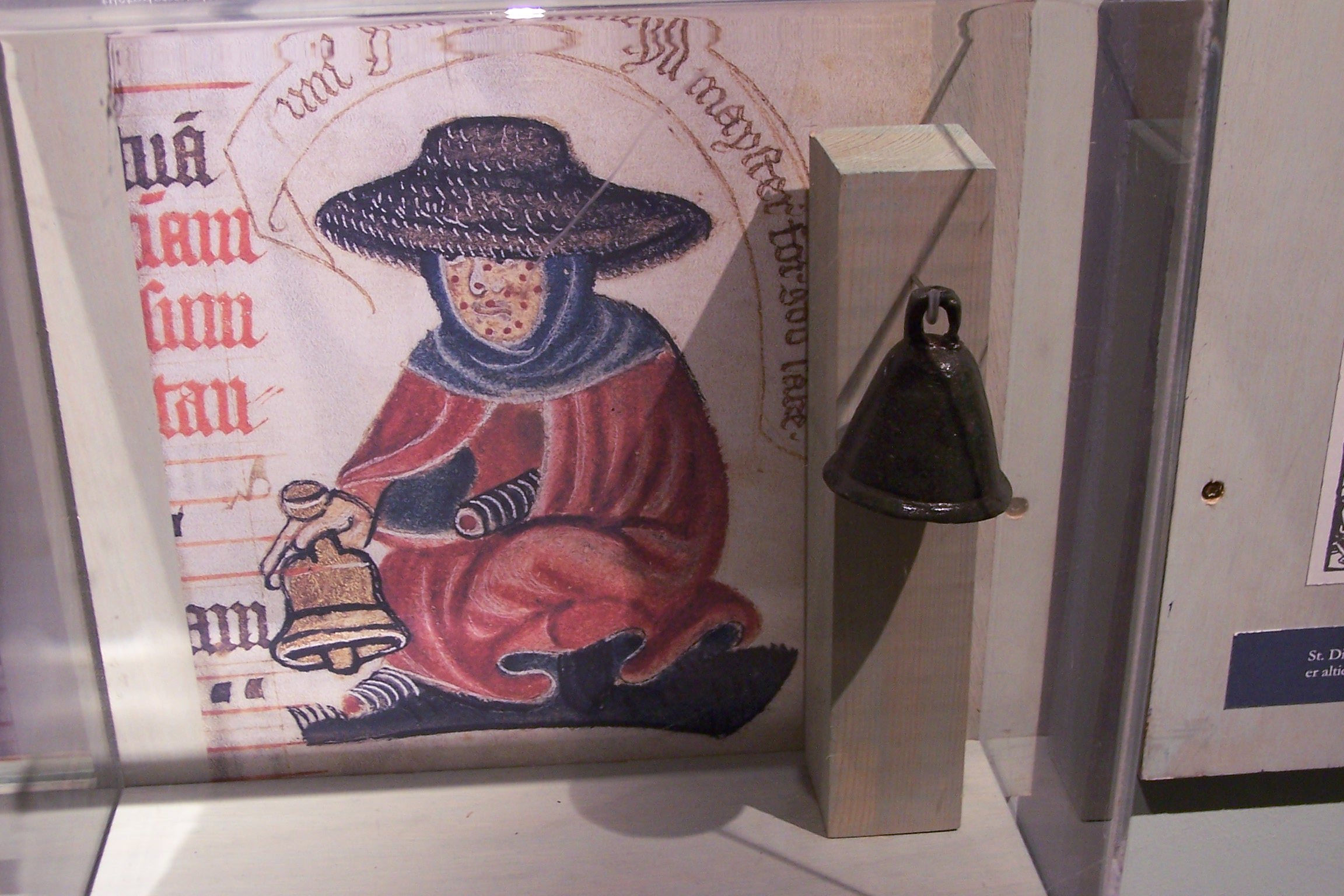
Medieval leper bell

Leprosy stigma has been associated with the disease for most of its history and has been universal. In Western Europe, it reached its peak during the Middle Ages, at a time when the disease was viewed as rendering the person "unclean". Many "lazar houses" were built. Patients had to carry bells to signal their presence but also to attract charitable gifts.

The discovery by Hansen in 1873 that leprosy was infectious and transmitted by a bacterium worsened leprosy stigma. It long became associated with sexually transmitted diseases and during the nineteenth century was even thought to be a stage of syphilis. The stigma of the disease was renewed among Europeans in the imperial era when they found it was "hyperepidemic in regions that were being colonized." It became associated with poor, developing countries, whose residents were believed by Europeans to be inferior in most ways.

Since the late twentieth century, with efforts by the World Health Organization to control the disease through distribution of free medication, many international organizations have been working to end the stigma attached to leprosy. They work to educate people and raise awareness of the facts about leprosy, in particular that it is only mildly contagious; some 95% of people are immune to the bacterium that causes it.

== Instances of leprosy stigma ==
Stigma surrounding Hansen's disease often favored society and sacrificed the individual rights of those afflicted. Numerous societies in the Middle Ages and nineteenth and twentieth centuries required separation of persons with leprosy from the general population. In some countries, stigma against people affected by leprosy is still widespread.

=== China ===
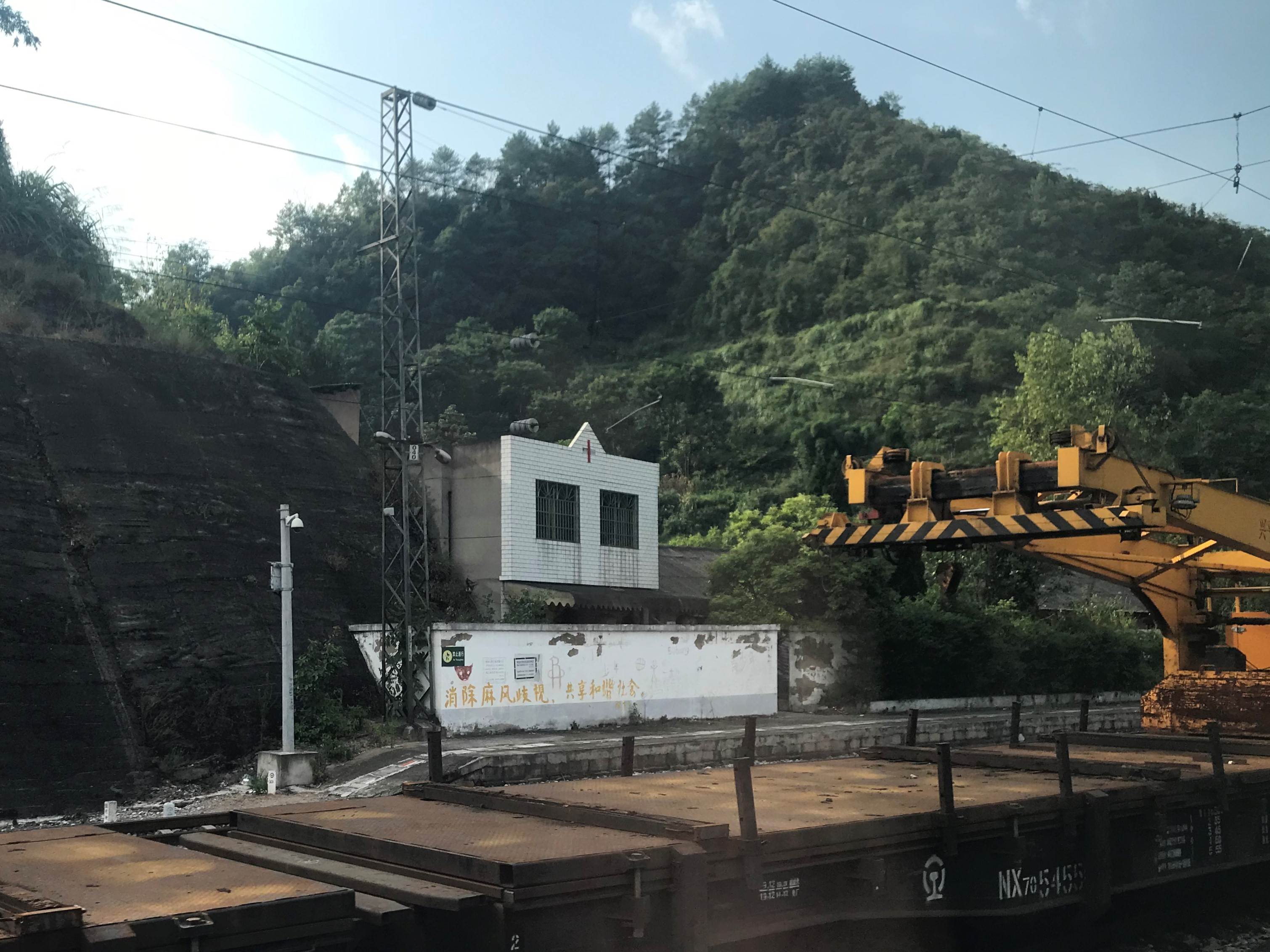
A campaign slogan against leprosy stigma, at a rural health center in Kaili, Guizhou

Evidence of leprosy can be traced as far back as 500–300 B.C. in Chinese literature, when it was considered punishment for amoral acts. Leprosy stigma has been considerable, though it has declined since the late twentieth century. Its resulting facial disfigurement and mutilation of limbs was feared. The disease's long incubation period resulted in mystery for centuries about its origins, inspiring horror, fear and disgust.

In current-day China, leprosy is strongly associated with poverty and stigma remains a significant barrier to effective treatment.

=== Japan ===
In Japan, the government required segregation of persons with leprosy, a separation that increased the social stigma against them. In medieval times, leprosy patients lived apart, settling around temples or shrines, where they begged for charity from passers-by. Starting in 1909, the government required leprosy patients to be hospitalized in the leprosy sanatoria, believing this would prevent transmission of the disease. In some cases, patients were forcibly taken to the sanatoria and their houses were disinfected in the presence of neighbors. Their families were also affected by leprosy stigma. Some patients attempted suicide. The law lasted until 1996.

- In Kumamoto, Japan, a patient with leprosy named Matsuo Fujimoto was tried on charges of an explosion in 1951 and murder in 1952. During the questioning and trial procedures, he was discriminated against as a leprosy patient. He was convicted and executed in 1962.
- Kumamoto Prefecture Governor Yoshiko Shiotani reported in 2003 that a hotel rejected reservations of ex-patients of Kikuchi Keifuen Sanatorium who were on the Prefecture's home visit program. Many people protested against the hotel. When the patients rejected the apology of the hotel, there were violent protests against the patients. The hotel tore down this building in June 2004.

In the Japanese drama film Sweet Bean directed by Naomi Kawase (2015), the issue of leprosy stigma affecting the character of Tokue turns out to be the main subject of the story and leads to a brief description of an existing community of ex-patients.

=== India ===
The concept of heredity has been deeply rooted, and when leprosy was thought to be inherited, persons with the disease (and their children) were shunned. As deformity was considered divine punishment, stigma was associated with it. As of 2016, in some states, leprosy is a legal cause for disenfranchisement; in all personal statuses, leprosy is a cause for divorce. 106 discriminatory laws affect lepers as of 2021.

=== Philippines ===
Hilarion Guia who became the first mayor of the town of Culion, Palawan has raised concerns on healthy children born and raised in the town of being affected by stigma due to the island town's association with the Culion leper colony. In 2006, the now former mayor notes while people who contracted leprosy suffer from low self-esteem from interacting with people with no history of the disease, the stigma is not prevalent among residents of Culion with 60 to 70 percent of the town's population related to former leprosy patients.

Despite advancement of treatment for leprosy, Philippine Leprosy Mission president and doctor Belen Lardizabal-Dofitas in 2020 cites stigma as a big factor preventing people afflicted with the disease to seek medical treatment.

=== Scandinavia ===
In Jopling's original report, he quoted Hansen as saying "the Norwegian state has always handled its leprosy victims humanely". Hospitalized patients were free to go out during the day to sell their handwork in the market, and were allowed to have visitors. There was little evidence of stigma. Many patients immigrated to the United States, though most did so to escape poverty.

=== United States ===
==== Hawaii ====
In 1865, the Kalaupapa Leprosy Settlement was founded on the island of Molokai, a geographically isolated peninsula bordered by high mountains ("the pali") on one side and rough sea waters and coral reef on the other, served as a prison for those affected by Hansen's disease on the Hawaiian Islands. By 1865 the rising numbers of Hansen's disease patients could no longer be ignored, the "Act to Prevent the Spread of Leprosy of the nation of Hawaii" was passed which criminalized leprosy and sentenced victims to permanent exile. The quarantine of lepers was based on the new assumption of leprosy being a highly contagious disease. Stigmatization of leprosy began as "a relatively unknown disease [changed] into a socially and morally threatening phenomenon". Those with severe cases were sent to Kalawao, an isolated settlement on the island of Molokaʻi. Later a second and larger settlement was developed at Kalaupapa. This settlement had a peak population of about 1100 shortly after the turn of the twentieth century; in total about 8500 persons were quarantined here over the decades until 1965. Both settlements are in Kalawao County. The entire county is now within what is known as the Kalaupapa National Historical Park, which preserves both the major structures of the settlements and the associated environment of the area.

For the Native Hawaiians, who constituted most of the Hansen's disease patients, exile was devastating. Culturally, they believed their self-identity was intrinsically tied to their land. To relocate them to Kalaupapa as exiles was just the same as stripping them of their identity. The stigma of Hansen's disease also led to no medical services between 1865–1873 on Kalaupapa. No doctors were sent there because they were afraid of becoming infected. Only kokua, family members, and Father Damien tended to the victims of Hansen's disease on Molokai. Kalaupapa was an innovative approach to a solution for leprosy by Westerners, which became a model for controlling disease worldwide: it was the first time ostracized and shunned people were torn from families and transported to a remote prison island.

After quarantine ended in 1960, those persons living at Kalaupapa who chose to do so could remain for the rest of their lives. However, dehumanizing medical rules and regulations regarding physical contact with Kalaupapa residents persisted even into the 1980s despite the discovery of curing sulfone drugs.

Myobacterium leprae was most likely brought to the island by Westerners, despite accusations of the Chinese plantation workers. In 1886, Molokai Leprosy Hospital reported that missionaries recognized leprosy as early as 1823 prior to any Chinese immigration. A physician also recognized similar symptoms in 1840, which was still before Chinese laborers came to Hawaii. The Chinese were able to recognize the disease because they had seen it in China, but they were not the ones to bring it to the island. It was most likely a Westerner, since the Hawaiians did not recognize the disease and there was no documentation of Hansen's disease among the Hawaiian prior to the arrival of Westerners. In addition, between 1866–1885, of the 3076 patients, 2997 were Native Hawaiian, 57 European, and 22 Chinese.

==== Louisiana ====
In 1884, the Louisiana legislature established a State Board of Leprosy Control, as there were numerous cases in the state. Some say the strain there was associated with the history of the slave trade from West Africa.

In 1917 the US Congress passed a bill to create a national leprosarium, which was built in Carville, Louisiana, and run by the Public Health Service, today known as the National Hansen's Disease Museum. In 1941, patient Stanley Stein founded a journal, The Star, to combat leprosy stigma. Researchers in the 1940s at the U.S. National Leprosarium proved the clinical effectiveness of the intravenous sulfone, Promin, the first widely effective treatment for the disease. It was used both to cure leprosy and mitigate the damage it caused. In the late twentieth century, researchers developed multidrug therapy (MDT) to offset antibiotic resistance developing in the disease bacterium.

The Carville leprosarium spearheaded new therapies for patients of leprosy, and pioneered a change in perception of those afflicted with the disease. Leprosy patients were not given the right to marry until 1952. Those who were married prior to their admittance at Carville were not allowed to live with their spouses unless the spouses were patients themselves. Patients were not allowed to leave the hospital grounds, were not permitted to vote in national elections, and any outgoing post was sterilized by baking. Upon discharge, patients were given a certificate that stated they were a "Public Health Service Leper", with the comment "No longer a menace to public health" added under their reason for discharge.

=== Patients' relatives and leprosarium workers ===
Because of associated ideas about heredity and contagion, children and families of persons with leprosy also suffered stigma. Studies found that only about 5% of spouses living with persons with the disease contracted it, making it clear that leprosy was not highly contagious.

== Factors contributing to leprosy stigma ==
=== Biblical references ===
In The Book of Leviticus, Leviticus 13 states "But if the bright spot is white on the skin of his body, and it does not appear to be deeper than the skin, and the hair on it has not turned white, then the priest shall isolate him who has the infection for seven days."

=== General public's misconceptions ===
The general public still has misconceptions about leprosy, with persistent beliefs that it is highly contagious. In the twenty-first century, agencies such as The Leprosy Mission campaign to end these misconceptions and work to educate people about leprosy, its causes, and how it is transmitted. They want people with the disease to be identified so they can be treated and limit the physical damage, as well as control contagion. In the twenty-first century, effective, free treatment of dapsone, rifampicin, and clofazimine was available through WHO. However, in many parts of the world, lay people still believe the disease to be incurable. The multi-drug therapy provided free to countries where the disease is endemic provides a reliable cure for leprosy.

The misconception also stems from the discontinuity between science and government policy. Although the medical community has agreed for decades that Hansen's disease is only mildly contagious, it still remains on the list of "communicable diseases of public health significance" for health-related grounds of inadmissibility on the US Citizenship and Immigration Services website, even though HIV was removed in 2010. As of 2018, Hansen's disease is still listed as a "communicable disease of public significance," and therefore, screened for as part of the immigration medical exam.

=== Leprosaria ===
Lazar hospitals, leprosaria, and colonies were built to quarantine persons with leprosy and associated with its stigma. Some of the leprosaria and colonies are situated in remote lands or islands.

=== The press ===
In the past, the press contributed to leprosy stigma, reflecting social values in many areas.

On the May 7, 2007 Lou Dobb's Tonight program, Madeleline Cosman, a scholar and lawyer—not physician, falsely stated "there have been 7000 cases in the past 3 years." In a later interview with 60 Minutes, Dobbs was questioned about the 7000 cases in 3 years figure but said, "If we reported it, it's a fact." On the contrary, The National Hansen's Disease Programme represented this number in 30 years—not 3 years. Although Dobbs admitted the mistake in a later New York Times article, the ramifications of the false statement persisted.

In 2012, leprosy support organisations successfully lobbied Aardman Animations to have a scene from The Pirates! In an Adventure with Scientists!, removed due to concerns about the image it portrayed. The scene involved a "leper ship", and a leprosy sufferer whose arm falls off during the scene. As there are already many myths surrounding leprosy, advocates working to end stigma believed that this scene was unhelpful. Aardman agreed to remove it. Some argued that the joke was harmless and should have been retained.

== Campaigns against leprosy stigma ==
=== The Star ===
Stanley Stein, a blind patient at the national leprosarium at Carville, started The Star, a crusading international magazine against leprosy stigma. The journal raised awareness of facts about Hansen's disease. The full text of the STAR Newsletter, 1941–2001 is available online.

The Star continues to be published twice a year. New copies are published on the 40 & 8 La Societe des Quarante Hommes et Huit Chevaux website. The back cover still includes facts about Hansen's Disease.

=== The United Nations ===
Since 1995, WHO has supported the eradication of Hansen's disease through the administration of free multi-drug treatment worldwide and the promotion of education of Hansen's disease to erase stigma towards Hansen's. Although the goal for the complete eradication of leprosy in 2020 seems infeasible for "zero patients" due to the long period of M. leprae dormancy, the WHO has shifted towards a "Final Push" Strategy focusing on early detection to reduce disabilities. Moreover, most patients do not die from leprosy but from other diseases and complication—not the bacteria infection itself. In addition, people may survive for many years but still have leprosy or survive with disabilities.

In June 2015, the UN Human Rights Council adopted a resolution on the elimination of discrimination against persons affected by leprosy and their family members. The Human Rights Council voted to establish the mandate of a Special Rapporteur on the issue in June 2017 for a period of three years. Subsequently in November 2017 Alice Cruz of Portugal was appointed as the UN Special Rapporteur on the elimination of discrimination against persons affected by leprosy and their family members. On 16 August 2018, Alice Cruz issued a statement saying that, "The use of leprosy as a pejorative metaphor derives from long-lasting stigmatising connotations produced by different cultural traditions, social rules and legal frameworks,.. Using it as a metaphor leads to wrongful stereotyping that fuels public stigma, everyday discrimination, and impairs the enjoyment of human rights and fundamental freedoms by persons affected and their families." Examples of politicians who made reference to leprosy while referring to opposition parties are the Portuguese Prime Minister, António Costa, and the Bangladeshi Shipping Minister, Shajahan Khan.

=== Museums ===
National Hansen's Disease Museum (Japan) in Tokyo, Japan is a representative museum showing the history of leprosy in Japan, for the eradication of leprosy stigma. It is situated next to the Tama Zenshoen Sanatorium. Smaller museums are associated with other sanatoriums in Japan, such as in Tohoku Shinseien Sanatorium, Kuryu Rakusen-en Sanatorium, Nagashima Aiseien Sanatorium and Kikuchi Keifuen Sanatorium.

The National Hansen's Disease Museum in Carville, Louisiana, collects, preserves and interprets the medical and cultural artifacts of the Carville Historic District. It promotes the understanding, identification and treatment of Hansen's disease (leprosy) by creating and maintaining museum displays, traveling exhibits, publications and a web site in order to educate and inform the public.

=== Delete the L Word / Don't Call Me a Leper ===
The Leprosy Mission international advocates for the end of the use of the term leper to describe a person with leprosy. The term has negative connotations for sufferers and, because of many historical references, has long been used to identify someone as "unclean" in a ritual sense, or who should not be touched or associated with. TLM England and Wales launched their "Don't Call Me A Leper" campaign in 2010, whilst TLM Scotland launched "Delete the L Word," in 2012.

Both organisations have noted that the word leper is "derogatory, ostracizing and outdated". They advocate for the use of the person-first term people/person with leprosy. For those undergoing treatment, leprosy patient would also be acceptable. TLM have regularly contacted the press to discourage the use of the word leper, and have successfully lobbied the BBC to have it added to guidance for words which should not be used.
