= National Hansen's Disease Museum (Japan) =

Medical museum in Tokyo, Japan

Coordinates: 35°45′58.3″N 139°29′53.2″E

National Hansen's Disease Museum (国立ハンセン病資料館)
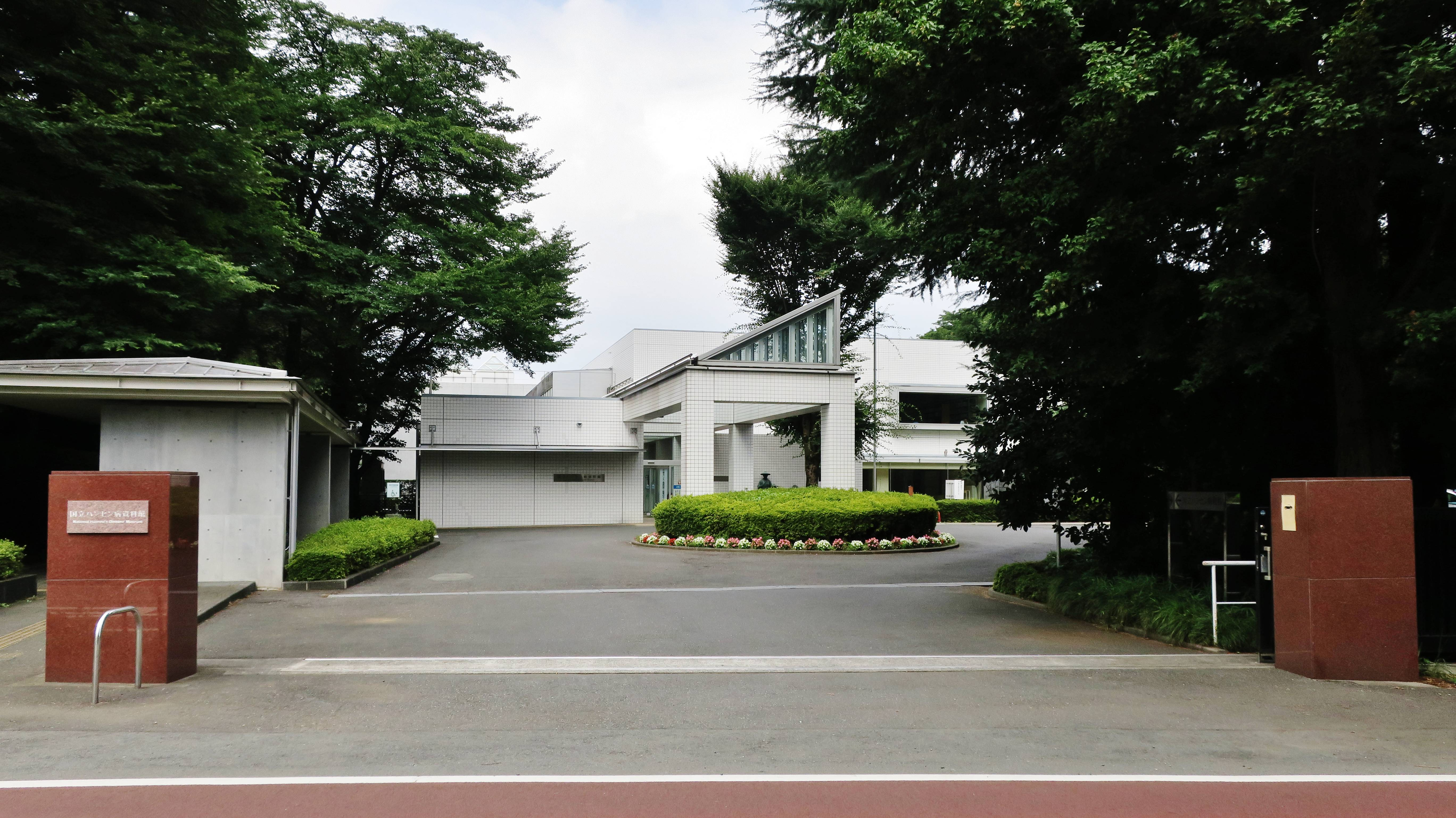
- main entrance
- Established: June 1993
- Location: Higashimurayama, Tokyo, Japan
- Website: www.hansen-dis.jp

The National Hansen's Disease Museum (国立ハンセン病資料館, Kokuritsu Hansen-byō Shiryōkan) is a museum in Higashimurayama, Tokyo, Japan that is dedicated to education about Hansen's disease (leprosy) and to eliminating discriminatory practices against its sufferers. It was formerly (1993–2007) named "His Imperial Highness Prince Takamatsu Memorial Museum of Hansen's Disease".

The museum is located next to one of Japan's remaining leprosy sanatoriums, and its purposes are:

- To promote awareness of leprosy
- To represent and preserve the history of leprosy in Japan
- To show what persons affected by leprosy have achieved
- To help restore the dignity of persons affected by leprosy
- To demonstrate the importance of human rights and the linked need to end prejudice and discrimination

== History ==
Fujio Ohtani wrote in the pamphlet "H.I.H. Prince Takamatsu Memorial Museum of Hansen's Disease": Our Museum was conceived as a commemorative undertaking for the Fortieth Anniversary of the Tofu Kyokai Foundation. While the construction plans were under way, the Leprosy Prevention Law still existed. All the parties involved ardently wished that this new Museum would function in a way to win the public support for abolition of the Law and to show the realities of the thirteen national and three religious associations affiliated with Hansen's Disease sanatoria, which were known only to a limited number of people.

=== Timeline ===
- June 25, 1993 H.I.H. Prince Takamatsu Memorial Museum of Hansen's disease opened.
- March, 2004 The master plan of the renewed museum was completed.
- October, 2004 The 10th year memorial book was published.
- September, 2005 The museum was transiently closed.
- March, 2007, The renewed National Museum of Hansen's Disease opened.

== On Display ==
- Demonstrations based on the first pamphlet.

=== The Meiji Era and Taisho Era ===
- Photograph of Dr. Hansen, Early leprosaria, Okamura who produced splendid chaoulmoogra oil and saved patients.
- Isolation strengthened.

=== Showa Era ===
- Injection of Promin, Struggle against the law.

=== Law was abolished, Trial for compensation ===
- Photographs of patients' struggles.

=== Life in Sanatoriums ===
- Photographs of hospitalization, Special money used only in sanatoriums.
- Treatment;Bandages, Injections of choaulmoogra oil, Labor assigned to patients.

==== Maintenance of Order ====
- Recreations, prisons.

==== Marriage, Abortions and Sterilization ====
- Marriage was permitted on the condition of sterilization.

==== Education in Sanatoriums ====
- Education was unsatisfactory. Schools were built within the sanatoriums and at the start, teachers with leprosy taught pupils.

==== Prejudice in Society (Leprosy Stigma) ====
- Complete destruction of Sotojima Hoyoen by typhoon, Fujimoto Incident, Tatsuda Children's Home Incident.

==== Death in Sanatoriums ====
- Funerals are important ceremonies. Every sanatorium has chapels, temples, a mortuary, a crematory, a charnel house, since the bones of patients had been usually rejected by their families. Traditionally each religious group performed funeral services for its members.

==== How to create something to live for ====
- Music, literature, and others are their pleasures in life.

==== Progress of Medicine ====
- Medical aspects of leprosy are shown, such as multidrug Therapy(MDT) and rehabilitation.

=== Sanatoriums in and out of Japan ===
- photographs of sanatoriums in Japan as well as out of Japan.

== Testimony of ex-patients and related persons ==
- Video testimony of 42 persons, which include ex-patients and some doctors.

== Information about the Museum ==
- Open: 9.30-16.30(admission 9.30-16.00)
- Closed: on Mondays
- Admission fee: free
- Address: 4-1-13, Aobacho, Higashimurayama-shi, Tokyo 189-0002
- Access: from Kiyose Station (Seibu-Ikebukuro line), 10 minutes by bus
- from Shin-akitsu Station (Higashinihontetudo), 10 minutes by bus
- Neighboring Sanatorium: National Tama-zenshoen Sanatorium
- Neighboring Leprosy Institute: Hansen's Disease Institute

== See also ==
- Leprosy
- Leprosy in Japan
- Kensuke Mitsuda
- Leprosy stigma
- Hannah Riddell
- Matsuki Miyazaki
