= Matsuoka Hoyoen Sanatorium =

National Sanatorium Matsuoka Hoyoen
- Ministry of Health, Labour and Welfare (Japan)

Geography
- Location: 19 Hirayama, Ishie, Aomori, Aomori, Japan
- Coordinates: 40°49′16″N 140°41′00″E

Organisation
- Care system: HealthCare of those who had leprosy
- Type: Specialist

Services
- Speciality: Leprosy

History
- Opened: 1909

Links
- Website: www.hosp.go.jp/~matuoka/ (in Japanese)
- Lists: Hospitals in Japan

The Matsuoka Hoyoen Sanatorium (国立療養所松丘保養園, Kokuritsuryōyōjo Matsuokahoyōen) or National Sanatorium Matsuoka Hoyoen is a sanatorium for leprosy and ex-leprosy patients situated in Aomori, Aomori, Japan that opened in 1909.

== History ==
The Japanese Government promulgated the first leprosy prevention law on March 19, 1907, which took effect on April 1, 1909. Japan was divided into 5 areas. The second area included Hokkaido, Miyagi Prefecture, Iwate Prefecture, Aomori Prefecture, Fukushima Prefecture, Yamagata Prefecture and Akita Prefecture. In this area, Aomori was selected for the sanatorium.

Foreigners who came into Japan after the Meiji Restoration(1868) were surprised to find leprosy patients in public areas in Japan. The Japanese Government was worried about the many leprosy patients among those who were examined for the draft at age 20.

=== Timeline ===
- April 1, 1909: Prefectural Hokubu (Northern) Hoyoin was established in Aburakawa Village Aomori-shi with 90 beds.
- October 1, 1909: It moved to the present site.
- July 1, 1941: National Sanatorium Matsuoka Hoyo-en.
- 1958: The number of allotted beds reached 950.
- April 1996: The 1953 Leprosy Prevention Law was abolished.
- July 1998: The trial for compensation started.
- May 11, 2001: The trial for compensation ruled that the previous Leprosy Prevention Law was unconstitutional.
- May 25, 2001: The trial for compensation was completed. Compensation of 8-14 million yen were given to patients depending on the duration of their confinement.

== Number of patients ==
The following table shows the number of patients held at the Sanatorium in selected years.

Year	Number of in-patients
1945	711
1950	605
1955	710
1960	719
1965	674
1970	598
1975	552
1980	495
1985	440
1990	384
1995	312
1999	261
2003	205
2004	189
2005	176
2006	161
2007	152
2008	147

== See also ==
- Leprosy in Japan
