= Tohoku Shinseien Sanatorium =

Coordinates: 38°40′56″N 141°03′38″E

National Sanatorium Tōhoku Shinseien

Geography
- Location: Sakomachi, Tome, Miyagi, Japan

Organisation
- Care system: HealthCare of those who had leprosy
- Type: National hospital run by Ministry of Health, Labour and Welfare (Japan)

History
- Opened: 1939

Links
- Website: www.tohoku-shinseien.com
- Lists: Hospitals in Japan

Tōhoku Shinseien Sanatorium or National Sanatorium Tōhoku Shinseien is a sanatorium for leprosy or ex-leprosy patients situated in Tome-shi, Miyagi-ken, Japan, founded in 1939.

== History ==
=== Background ===
Following prefectural sanatoriums, the Japanese Government decided to increase sanatoriums, starting with National Sanatorium Nagashima Aiseien Nagashima Aiseien Sanatorium in 1930. Tohoku Shinseien Sanatorium was the 6th sanatorium which was established in 1939.

=== Tohoku Shinseien Sanatorium ===
- In October, 1939, National Sanatorium Tohoku Shinseien was established.
- Apr 1996:The 1953 Leprosy Prevention Law was abolished.
- Jul 1998: The trial for compensation started.
- May 11, 2001: The trial for compensation ruled that the previous Leprosy Prevention was unconstitutional.
- May 25, 2001: The trial for compensation was confirmed. The compensation of 8,000,000 yen to 14,000,000 yen was given to patients depending on the duration of unconstitutional periods.

=== Number of Patients at the end of the fiscal year ===
The number of in-patients is the sum of patients which changed not only by the newly diagnosed hospitalized and those who died among in-patients, by other factors such as the number of patients who escaped or were discharged, depending on the condition of the times. Recently they were encouraged to be discharged, but the long period of the segregation policy causing leprosy stigma might influence the number of those who went into the society.

- the end of the fiscal year is the March 31, next year

Number of in-patients
Year	Males	Females	Total
1939	39	13	52
1940	311	139	450
1945	430	175	605
1955	397	220	617
1965	350	204	554
1975	299	174	473
1985	230	157	387

Year	Number of in-patients
2003	191
2004	177
2005	167
2006	158
2007	152
2008	144

=== The number of healed, discharged patients ===
Year	Patients
1940	9
1941	21
1942	13
1943	8
1944	2
1945	5
1946	3
1947	0

Year	Patients
1948	0
1949	3
1950	0
1951	0
1952	1
1953	0
1954	2
1955	1

Year	Patients
1956	2
1957	3
1958	2
1959	2
1960	29
1961	7
1962	6

== Museum ==
- On June 26, 2006, "Shinsei Museum" opened with various historical materials concerning patients' life in previous days of the Sanatorium in the classroom of the branch school of Hanokizawa within the Sanatorium. Its purpose is to reduce leprosy stigma. It is open between 10 a.m. and 3 p.m. on weekdays.
