= Tama Zenshoen Sanatorium =

National Sanatorium Tama Zenshōen
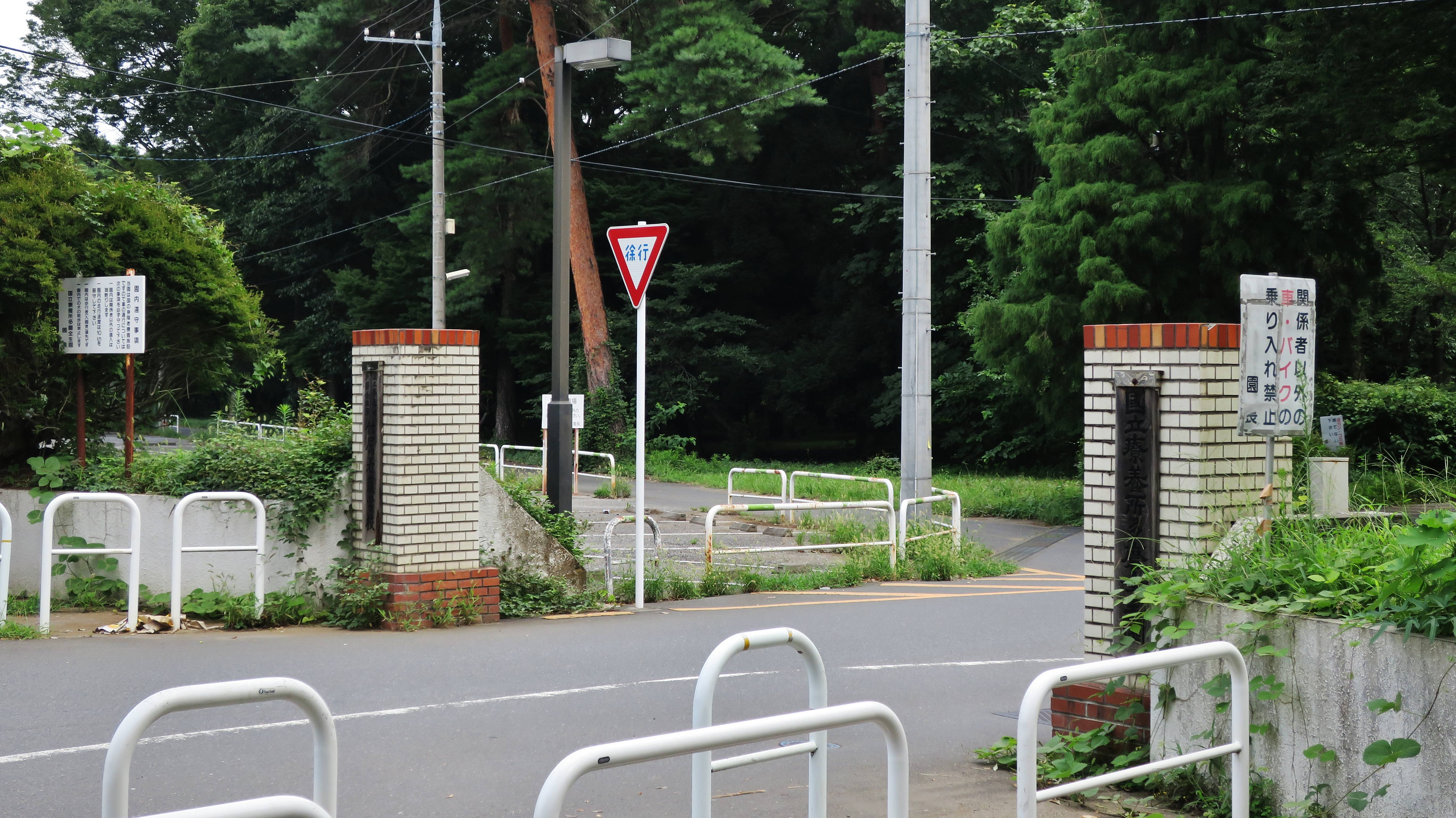
- Tama Zenshoen Sanatorium gate

Geography
- Location: 4-1-1, Aobacho, Higashimurayama, Tokyo, Japan
- Coordinates: 35°45′55″N 139°29′37.6″E

Organisation
- Type: National hospital run by Ministry of Health, Labour and Welfare (Japan)

History
- Opened: 1909

Links
- Website: http://www.nhds.go.jp/~zenshoen/
- Lists: Hospitals in Japan

Tama Zenshōen Sanatorium, or National Sanatorium Tama Zenshōen, is a sanatorium for leprosy or ex-leprosy patients situated in Higashimurayama, Tokyo, Japan starting in 1909.

== History ==
=== Background ===
The Japanese Government promulgated the first leprosy prevention law on March 19, 1907, but it became effective on April 1, 1909 because of financial difficulties. Japan was divided into 5 areas, and the first area included Tokyo-fu, Kanagawa Prefecture, Niigata Prefecture, Saitama Prefecture, Gunma Prefecture, Chiba Prefecture, Ibaragi Prefecture, Tochigi Prefecture, Aichi Prefecture, Shizuoka Prefecture, Yamanashi Prefecture and Nagano Prefecture. In this area, Tokyo was selected as the site of the sanatorium. Two main reasons for the leprosy prevention law were pressure from foreigners who came into Japan after the Meiji Restoration, who were very much surprised to find wandering leprosy patients in Japan, as well as the Japanese Government worrying about the considerable number of leprosy patients among those who were examined for the draft at age 20.

=== Tama Zensho Hospital and Sanatorium ===
- On September 28, 1909, Prefectural Tama Zensho Byoin (Hospital) was established.
- Jun 1919: Kensuke Mitsuda reported what became known as "Mitsuda reaction" later.
- Sep 1919: Special money circulating only in the sanatorium (Enken) started.
- Mar 1931: 81 patients went to National Sanatorium Nagashima Aiseien following Kensuke Mitsuda in order to make it an ideal sanatorium.
- Feb 1936: Tamio Hōjō's "The first night of life" was published in Bungakukai, and became a milestone of leprosy literature by the recommendation of Yasunari Kawabata who won the Nobel Prize for Literature in 1968.
- Apr 1996: The 1953 Leprosy Prevention Law was abolished.
- Jul 1998: The trial for compensation started.
- May 11, 2001: The trial for compensation ruled that the previous Leprosy Prevention was unconstitutional.
- May 25, 2001: The trial for compensation was confirmed. The compensation of 8,000,000 yen to 14,000,000 yen was given to patients depending on the duration of unconstitutional periods.

=== Directors ===
- Apr 1909: Acting director: Tokutaro Ohno
- Sep 1909: Chief doctor: Kensuke Mitsuda
- Mar 1910: First director : Saijiro Ikeuchi
- Feb 1914: Second director: Kensuke Mitsuda
- May 1931: Third director: Yoshinobu Hayashi
- Jul 1963: Fourth director: Ryoichi Yajima
- Apr 1976: Fifth director: Masao Arai
- Apr 1977: Sixth director: Kishio Ohnishi

=== Number of patients at fiscal year end ===
The number of in-patients is the sum of patients which changed not only by the newly diagnosed hospitalized and those who died among in-patients, but also by other factors such as the number of patients who escaped or were discharged, depending on the condition. Recently they were encouraged to be discharged, but the long period of the segregation policy causing leprosy stigma might influence the number of those who reintegrate into society.

Number of In-patients
Year	Males	Females	Total
1909	165	63	228
1920	338	133	471
1930	762	291	1053
1940	805	403	1208
1950	733	411	1144
1960	771	407	1178
1970	660	375	1035
1978	640	360	1000

Number of in-patients
Year	Number of in-patients
2003	447
2004	417
2005	371
2006	358
2007	334
2008	319

== Museum ==
- National Hansen's Disease Museum (Japan), neighboring the hospital.

== Leprosy Research Center ==
- The Leprosy Research Center of the National Institute of Infectious Diseases is also situated near the hospital.
