= Nagashima Aiseien Sanatorium =

Coordinates: 34°40′49″N 134°14′51″E

National Sanatorium Nagashima Aiseien

Geography
- Location: 6539 Mushiake, Oku-machi, Setouchi, Okayama, Japan

Organisation
- Care system: Healthcare for those who had leprosy
- Type: National hospital run by Ministry of Health, Labour and Welfare (Japan)

History
- Founded: 1930

Links
- Website: www.hosp.go.jp/~aiseien/
- Lists: Hospitals in Japan

The Nagashima Aiseien Sanatorium (国立療養所長島愛生園), or the National Sanatorium Nagashima Aiseien, is a sanatorium on the island of Nagashima in Setouchi, Okayama, Japan founded in 1930 for the treatment of leprosy. Currently, only former leprosy patients reside there.

== History ==
=== Background ===
In 1927, members of Japan's Lower House presented a bill stating that the present prefectural leprosy sanatoriums were insufficient and that the government needed to establish national sanatoriums. When the bill was passed, it was decided that the first national sanatorium would be built on an island, following the recommendations of leprologist and director of the Tokyo's Tama Zenshoen Sanatorium Kensuke Mitsuda.

=== Nagashima riot ===
==== Background ====
Kensuke Mitsuda was so zealous about eliminating leprosy that he admitted more patients than the sanatorium could reasonably accommodate. In July 1936, the number of patients admitted was 1,163 while its real capacity was 890. Because of the overcrowding, its food and housing conditions deteriorated.

==== Riot ====
On 10 August 1936, four patients were caught trying to escape the sanitorium. This led to an atmosphere of unrest, and on 13 August, Mitsuda called a meeting of the patients and warned them against misconduct. Dining hour was thus delayed, and in the middle of the night, patients gathered and got excited; demonstrations took place, with some people refusing to do their assigned work. The unrest had to be controlled by special policemen, and some patients were used to spy on other patients.

==== Negotiations ====
After 10 days of heated negotiations with officials from the Interior Ministry, the Police Department of Okayama Prefecture, the Special Police Section and Mitsuda, the patients were permitted to form Jichikai (a patients' association), a kind of self-governing organization. Patients later divided into pro-Mitsuda and anti-Mitsuda factions.

=== Oku-Nagashima Ohashi Bridge ===
On 9 May 1988, the mainland and the islands of Nagashima Aiseien and Oku Komyoen were joined upon completion of the Oku-Nagashima-Ohashi Bridge. The bridge was planned and built not by the Ministry of Construction but by the Ministry of Health and Welfare. There are records that show that patients had been advocating for a bridge since 1968, presumably after they realised that improvements in bridge construction and engineering such as the Five Bridges of Amakusa in 1966, made such bridges possible. Lobbying was restarted in 1972, and the Oku-Nagashima-Ohashi Bridge was completed in 1988.

=== Timeline ===
- 20 November 1930: Several buildings were completed, and the National Leprosarium was founded. The first director was Kensuke Mitsuda.
- 3 March 1931: The National Leprosarium Nagashima Aiseien was given its name by the Interior Ministry.
- 27 March 1931: 85 patients arrived from Tama Zenshoen Sanatorium, Tokyo.
- 23 December 1931: 10-tsubo (33-square-meter) houses were built with donated money.
- 10 January 1938: The ministry responsible changed from the Interior Ministry to the Ministry of Health and Welfare.
- 5 May 1944: An elementary school was established on its grounds.
- 1 November 1946: The facility was renamed the National Sanatorium Nagashima Aiseien.
- 16 September 1955: Niirada High School was established within the sanatorium, with students arriving from other leprosy sanatoriums.
- 3 March 1987: The high school was closed. (369 students had enrolled, and 307 students had graduated.)
- 9 May 1988: The Oku-Nagashima-Ohashi Bridge was completed.
- 1 November 1989: A bus service from Okayama to the sanatorium started its runs.
- April 1996: The 1953 Leprosy Prevention Law was abolished.
- July 1998: The trial for compensation of former residents started.
- 11 May 2001: The trial ruled that detaining patients under the previous law was unconstitutional.
- 25 May 2001: The trial was confirmed. The compensation of ¥8 million to ¥14 million yen was given to each patient depending on the duration of their stay.

== Number of patients ==
Year	Number of in-patients
1945	1478
1950	1496
1955	1701
1960	1675
1965	1509
1970	1326
1975	1167
1980	1073
1985	955
1990	841
1995	685
1999	590

Year	Number of in-patients
2003	488
2004	457
2005	432
2006	405
2007	379
2008	360
2009	336

== See also ==
- Leprosy in Japan
