= Kensuke Mitsuda =

Japanese leprologist (1876–1964)

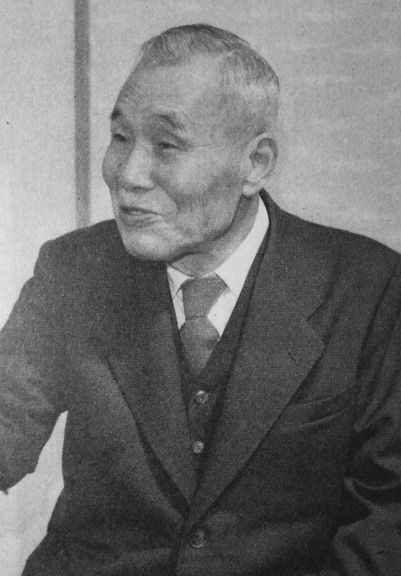
- Kensuke Mitsuda in 1956
- Born: January 12, 1876; Yamaguchi Prefecture, Japan
- Died: May 14, 1964 (aged 88)
- Occupations: Physician, Director of Sanatoriums
- Known for: Leprosy researches (pathology), Lepromin reaction, (Mitsuda reaction), Segregation of leprosy patients

Kensuke Mitsuda (光田 健輔, Mitsuda Kensuke; January 12, 1876 – May 14, 1964) was a Japanese leprologist and director of the Tama Zenshoen Sanatorium (1914–1931) and the National Sanatorium Nagashima Aiseien (1931–1957). He had been at the frontier of leprosy policy of Japan. He was given the Order of Cultural Merits (1951) and Damien-Dutton Award (1961). He has been the cause of admiration from one side, and the target of criticism from the other.

== Life ==
=== Early life ===
- He was born in Yamaguchi Prefecture in 1876 and studied medicine at a private doctor's office in Yamaguchi city. He went up to Tokyo in 1894 and studied medicine at a doctor's office and passed the First Stage Doctors' Practice Examination in 1895. Later he studied at a Private school Saisei Gakusha. He passed the final qualification examination in 1896. He then studied pathology at the University of Tokyo for two years. In 1897, he worked at the Tokyo Metropolitan Yoikuen Hospital where he met leprosy patients. In 1899, he isolated leprosy patients within the hospital and created a ward "Kaishun Ward", named after Kaishun Hospital of Kumamoto. This was the first case of leprosy care in Japanese public hospitals. Later he lectured many times on the need of public leprosy policy.

=== Tama Zenshoen Hospital ===
- In 1909, he became the chief doctor at the newly established Tama Zenshoen Hospital and then in 1914 he became the director of the hospital. He made a world trip to study leprosy abroad.

=== National Sanatorium Nagashima Aiseien ===
- Following the examples of Hawaii and the Philippines, remote islands were considered as possible sites of sanatoriums, and a national sanatorium was established in the Inland Sea of Okayama Prefecture, and he became the first director in 1931.

== Criticisms ==
- He started vasectomy in order to cope with the children born of patients. Originally, it was due to difficulties to bring up the children within the hospital, and later, the worsening of leprosy in pregnancy. The Interior Ministry was consulted, but did not give any response. Later he was bitterly criticized.
- Kensuke Mitsuda was also known as a strict segregationalist and in 1951 he testified at the Japanese Upper House that all Hansen's disease patients be hospitalized. Although the value of Promin was being established later, he did not change his principle and contributed to the 1953 leprosy prevention law, which retained the principle of segregation.
  - His testimony on November 8, 1951. "The statistics of the Ministry of Welfare say that 2000 patients are not in the sanatoriums, but there may be more patients. The patients out of the sanatoriums should be hospitalized, and many patients refuse our requests. Familial infection continues if forced hospitalization is not introduced. Handcuffs may be necessary, but intellectuals do not enter sanatoriums with excuses. The law should be powerful." On October 2, 1952. "On the testimony last year, I did not have enough time for preparation. There was no time. The people I want to hospitalize with power are exceptionally violent patients. I am afraid of familial infection."

== Pathology ==
- As a leprologist, he was essentially a pathologist. He first discovered the coexistence of tuberculosis and leprosy in a lymph node. The number of autopsies he conducted is the largest in the world, when the cases performed later were added.

== Immunology ==
- Although he did not regard himself an immunologist, his discovery of the lepromin test is his most important achievement. It proved very useful in the classification of leprosy. However, the original idea was to distinguish leprosy patients and persons with normal blood, and he invented a skin test using the killed bacilli, the original Mitsuda reaction. He reported it at the 3rd International Leprosy Congress in 1923 but received little attention. Mitsuda stored the necessary materials in a refrigerator and tried to persuade many doctors who came under him to study them, and finally found Fumio Hayashi. The Mitsuda Test was at last completed by Fumio Hayashi.

== Importance of the Mitsuda (lepromin) Reaction ==
- The importance of the Mitsuda (lepromin) reaction may be confirmed by the fact that it is the axis of the Ridley-Jopling classification of leprosy. Four papers related to the Mitsuda reaction in the Year Book of Dermatology follow.
- Histologic study of the Mitsuda reaction in patients with lepromatous leprosy and its prognostic value in bacteriologically negative cases. Oscar Reyes. Med cutanea 3:1139, 1968.
- Comparison in leprosy patients of Fernandez and Mitsuda reactions using human and armadillo antigens: double-blind study. Millar JW, Gannon C, Chan CSP. Int J Lepr 43:226-233, 1975.
- The Mitsuda lepromin reaction in long-term treated lepromatous leprosy. Waters MFR, Ridley DS, Lucas SB. Lepr Rev 61,347-352, 1990.
- Lepromin skin testing in the classification of Hansen's disease in the United States. Krotoski WA, et al. Am J Med Scie 305:18-24, 1993.

== Representative Papers of Mitsuda ==
  - His name Mitsuda K is omitted
- On the lymphadenitis leprosa, Tokyo Igakkai Zasshi, 13, 1899
- Pathological changes in the peripheral nerves and blood vessels, Tokyo Igakkai Zasshi 14,15, 1900
- On the lymphnode affected with leprosy and tuberculosis, Tokyo Igakkai Zasshi 15,9, 1901
- On the leprosy of internal organs, Nihon Rengo Igakkaishi 1902
- Pathological changes in the blood vessels and their significance, Nihon Igaku 15, 1906
- Pathological changes in the central nervous system in leprosy, Shinkeigaku Zasshi, 6,6 and 7, 1906
- On the serum reactions in leprosy, Jpn J Dermatol Urol 11,7, 1910
- On the therapeutic value of Gynocardia ( Chaulmoogra) oil in leprosy, Jpn J Dermatol Urol 12,12, 1912
- On the value of skin reaction with emulsion of leproma, Jpn J Dermatol Urol 19,8, 1919 (The first paper leading to the Mitsuda reaction)
- On the relation between tattoo and Mycobacterium leprae, Jpn J Dermatol Urol 27,8, 1927
- Coexistence of leprosy and scabies, Nihon Kohshuuhokenkyoukai Zasshi, 10,11, 1934
- On the Langhans giant cell in leprosy and the stellate body in nodular leprosy, Int J Lepr 3,3, 1935
- A study of 150 autopsies on cases of leprosy, Int J Lepr 5,1, 1937
- On alopecia leprosa, Int J Lepr 5,3, 1937
- On the classification of leprosy, Repura 15,2, 1943
- Treatment of leprosy with cepharanthin, Nihon Igaku 3389, 1944
- The southernmore, the milder leprosy becomes, Repura 15,3, 1944
- Pathological studies of leprosy treated with Promin, Repura 20,5, 1951
- Atlas of leprosy (book), 1952
