= Tichilești (disambiguation) =

Tichilești may refer to several populated places in Romania:

- Tichilești, a commune in Brăila County
- Tichilești, a village in Horia Commune, Constanța County
- Tichilești, Tulcea, a leper colony in Tulcea County
