= Culion leper colony =

Leper colony in the Philippines

Coordinates: 11°53′N 120°01′E

Culion
- Former leper colony
- Interactive map of Culion
- Country: Philippines
- Province: Palawan
- Municipality: Coron (until 1992); Culion (after 1992)

The Culion leper colony is a former leprosarium located on Culion, an island in the Palawan province of the Philippines. It was established by the U.S. government in order to rid leprosy from the Philippine Islands through the only method known at the time: isolating all existing cases and gradually phasing out the disease from the population. In addition to segregating the disease from the rest of the population, the island was later established in order to offer a better opportunity for people afflicted with leprosy to receive adequate care and modern treatments.

== Historical background ==
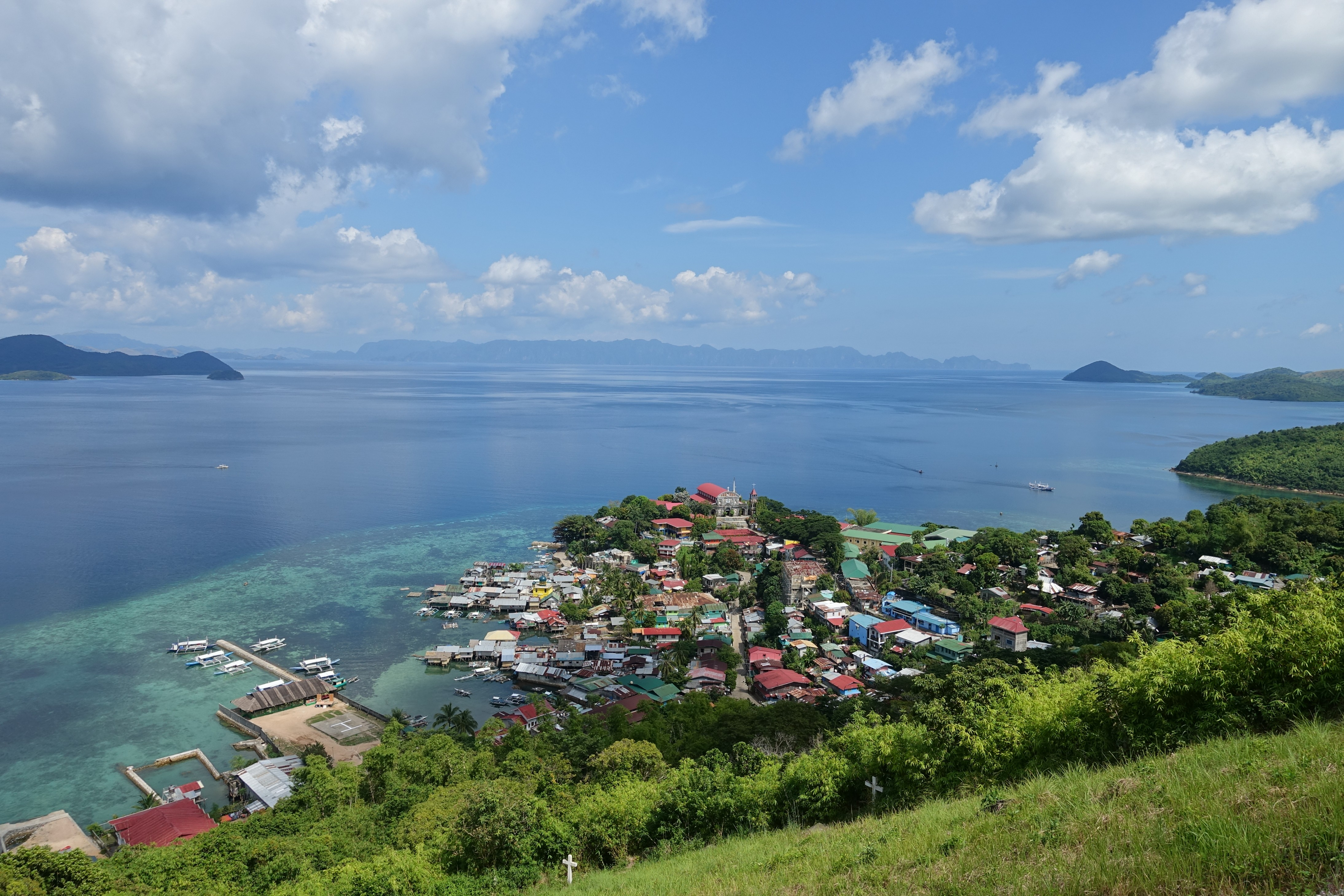
Culion leper colony in Culion old town in Palawan, Philippines, used to shelter one of the largest population of lepers in Asia, numbering between 3,500 and 4,000.

=== Origin of leprosy in the Philippines ===
Leprosy in the Philippines dates back to time of the first Spanish exploration of the Philippines. In the 16th century Franciscans established a shelter for the care of those afflicted with leprosy close to their monastery in Manila, where the hospital San Juan de Dios is located. In 1632 the emperor of Japan, knowing that the Spanish Catholic Church had an interest in caring for those afflicted with disease, sent 134 Japanese lepers by ship to Manila. The Spanish Franciscans, initially reluctant to accept the shipment from the emperor, eventually took in the Japanese patients and housed them in the Hospital of San Lazaro in Manila. However, the Japanese citizens are not attributed as the main source of leprosy in the colonies, as the Philippines is known to have had commerce with other Asian countries known to have been afflicted with leprosy.

By 1830, approximately 400 lepers were patients in leper colonies established by Catholic priests at Manila, Cebu, and Nueva Caceres. Those afflicted were segregated from the rest of the population but still allowed to have contact with family and other inhabitants of the island. The purpose of the hospitals and leprosy establishments at that time was not to eradicate the disease or segregate it from the rest of the population but instead to provide humanitarian aid. The Hospital of San Lazaro in Manila was run by Franciscans until September 1898, when it was turned over to the American authorities. The other islands of Cebu, Palestina, and Nueva Cáceres were ordered abandoned by General Leonard Wood.

=== Culion establishment ===
By the time American forces landed in the Philippines at the beginning of the 20th century, surveys estimated that approximately 3,500 to 4,000 people with leprosy were living on the islands, and some 1,200 new cases were developing each year. With this burgeoning patient population throughout the colony, American forces shifted the colony's purpose from giving humanitarian aid to seeking to establish a formal, segregated island to control the spread of the diseases and ultimately exterminate it. Military authorities surveyed two locations, one at Culion and one at Cagayan de Jolo and found Culion to be the most desirable location. $50,000 was given to the colony by the Second Philippine Commission on October 27, 1902, for the creation of the Culion Leper Colony under the Director of Health Victor Heiser. However, construction did not begin until 1905 due to issues financing the project and conflicting opinions amongst medical professionals arguing whether segregation was an appropriate method of controlling and eradicating the disease. On May 27, 1906, the first 370 patients from Cebu landed on Culion carried by two Coast Guard cutters. These two ships made multiple trips to different parts of the Philippines and brought patients to Culion.

== Structure, function and government ==
=== Segregation system ===
By Act 1711 of the Philippine Commission, passed September 12, 1907, Heiser was given the responsibility of locating, segregating, and moving any known person afflicted with leprosy in the Philippines to Culion. His plan was to remove patients first from well isolated islands with few infected people so that the spread of the disease could be prevented where it was not firmly entrenched. The segregation system initially received resistance from Filipinos afflicted with leprosy. In an attempt to popularize the island so that patients went to Culion willingly, Heiser sent agents to Filipino towns to disseminate information about Culion's housing, the type of food the residents would eat, and the medical facilities available. Nevertheless, many of the islands' inhabitants made great effort to evade Heiser's segregation program. The public would also tip off the authorities about people who were possibly infected with leprosy. Many Filipinos, in acts of revenge, would anonymously notify authorities of a purported case of leprosy in hope of having them removed from the island. Even politicians, using leprosy's negative public image, would anonymously report their political foes' family members as carriers of leprosy for their own political gain.

=== Infrastructure ===
The island was initially staffed by one physician, Dr. Charles F. de Mey, five French sisters of the Congregation of the Sisters of Saint Paul of Chartres, a Jesuit priest and several other employees. The staff eventually grew to include a chief physician, 12 clinical physicians, a dental surgeon, a pharmacist, 21 graduate nurses, 13 sisters, and 150 nursing aids.

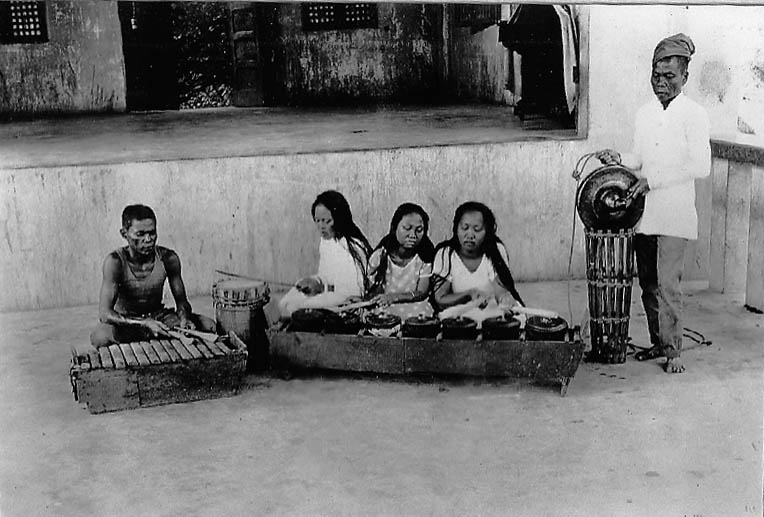
Members of the Culion leper colony in an undated photograph. The women in the center appear to be playing the kulintang traditional instrument.

As more resources became available, the colony began to expanding its own community. Over 400 houses, a theatre, a town hall, a school, a piped water supply with reservoirs, and a sanitary sewer system were built for the colony's patients and staff. Since leprosy confined to bed only patients in its most severe form, patients were allowed to organize their own municipal government with a police force, civic courts and currency system isolated from the rest of the Philippine islands.

Under the direction of Heiser, the colony's municipal government was made up of a chief physician and representatives from each tribal group living on the island, composing of the Visayan, Tagalog, Ilocano, Bicolano, Ilongo, Moro, English and Americans. Each representative, by popular vote, was elected every two years. A police force enforced the laws set up by the chief physician and the representatives and regularly patrolled the outlying districts and maintained order inside the colony. The police force, made up of patients, also played a role in maintaining the island's cleanliness and sanitary conditions. In addition to a police force, a civil court system was established where petty cases were discussed.

=== Culture ===
Religious organizations influenced the role of marriage, and consequently parenthood, in patients' lives. Before Filipino authorities established a ban on marriage in the colony, Christian groups on the island, along with authorities, took an active stand against the marriage between lepers, citing that "marital life is not conducive to their own well being ... they usher into the world healthy and innocent children who are born only to be separated from their parents and placed under the care of the Welfare Commissioner or of a relative, so that they may not suffer the fate of their progenitors." Authorities were also opposed to marriage because statistics at the time showed that if babies were not removed from their mothers before they were six months old, approximately half of them would become leprous. This led to a problem for Heiser in which, without the support of a law giving him authority to remove a child, he had to either somehow convince a leprous mother to turn over her child or, without the removal of the child, be forced to possibly allow the mother to expose leprosy to her child.

=== Treatment ===
The epidemiology of leprosy transmission was still hotly debated at the time of the leprosarium's existence. Hundreds of remedies had been tried, but none yielded promising results all while patients alternately recovered and relapsed for reasons not understood. Natives used remedies ranging from hot baths to rubbing leaves on leprous lesions to spiritual charms. Heiser admitted that Western medicine often failed to identify those who were afflicted with leprosy.

It sometimes seemed as though the mere intuition of the less progressive people grasped more than the scientific wisdom of the Western World. The Common people of the East can often, by mere glance, detect a leper when the American or European physician, after clinical examination, fails to find evidence of the disease. In such cases, bacteriological examinations will often show that the ignorant native is right. Dr. Strong was once riding through the streets of Manila in his carromata when a Filipino sanitary inspector stopped him and informed him the driver was a leper. Dr. Strong was outraged, but the inspector’s diagnosis turned out to be true.

— Victor G. Heiser, An American Doctor's Odyssey

The use of chaulmoogra oil, first demonstrated in a Louisiana leper colony, became an effective way of treating the disease as many cases became negative after the first year. However, the treatment was very slow in improvement and recovery. However, people treated with chaulmoogra oil suffered great physical mutilations caused by leprous sores. With the negative stigma of leprosy and unsightly sores, normal reintegration back into society after successful treatment became an almost impossible task. Authorities segregated part of the island where leprosy-free but badly mutilated patients could earn a living. Health education, as proposed by the World Health Organization, was aimed to control this stigmatization.

=== American presence ===
Many American veterans fighting in the Spanish–American War ultimately contracted leprosy while serving overseas. Having been under the jurisdiction of the Philippine Health service, the colony was known to have good doctors with the wide experience in treating leprosy, a disease not many doctors had seen except under a microscope. American Perry Burgess wrote "Who Walk Alone," a book in which he recounts the experience of an American veteran in isolation at Culion. Burgess served as the president and executive officer of Leonard Wood Memorial for the Eradication of Leprosy from 1928 to 1958. The Leonard Wood Memorial funding helped found a research institute on Culion to study leprosy, headed by Dr. Herbert Wade, chief medical officer of Culion from 1927 to 1963. Wade and his associates published hundreds of papers on leprosy, including many in the International Journal of Leprosy, which the Leonard Wood Memorial supported and Wade edited.

== Decline ==
Under Governor-General Leonard Wood, Culion continued to expand its staff and facilities and continued using chaulmoogra oil for treatment into the 1920s and 1930s. However, it was later shown that 46.4% of the patients discharged as negative subsequently relapsed. Culion's decline began with staff layoffs during the financial crisis of 1933. After 1935, only leprosy patients who preferred life at Culion as opposed to life at a leprosarium closer to their region were shipped to Culion. With advanced treatment methods and the influence of regional clinics, Culion lost its eminence as a model leprosarium and had its population reduced to 739 by 1978.

In 1998, the Department of Health declared that leprosy is no longer a serious issue in Culion. Since 2006, the sanitarium has only accommodated leprosy survivors who are incapacitated, old, or have no living relatives.

== Legacy ==
In 2018, the Culion Leprosy Archives was officially inscribed to the UNESCO Memory of the World Register – Asia and the Pacific. The government and the Asia-Pacific bloc aims to nominate the archives further to the International Memory of the World Register. If approved by UNESCO, it will be the fifth internationally recognized documentary heritage of the Philippines, increasing Culion town's feasibility to become a World Heritage Site in the future.

== See also ==
- List of Memory of the World Documentary Heritage in the Philippines
