= Hilarion Guia =

Filipino activist and educator (1942–2016)

1st Mayor of Culion
- Preceded by: Office established

Personal details
- Born: Hilarion Magbuhos Guia; October 21, 1942 Mabini, Batangas, Philippine Commonwealth
- Died: March 2016 (aged 73)
- Spouse: Rosalinda Hilao

Hilarion Magbuhos Guia was a Filipino educator, leprosy activist and the first mayor of Culion, Palawan. He was afflicted with leprosy until the 1960s.

== Early life ==
Hilarion Magbuhos Guia was born on October 21, 1942, to Gil Guia and Maria Magbuhos in Mabini, Batangas. He was the youngest of nine children of a family which owned vast agricultural lands. He and five other siblings contracted leprosy and the family had to sell the lands for medical treatment expenses.

== Biography ==
=== Living with leprosy, education and teaching ===
Hilarion Guia was orphaned at age three left to the care of his grandmother Francisca Gonzales. Guia went to the Culion leper colony in May 1950 motivated with the prospect of attaining formal education. He attended the Culion Catholic Elementary School and St. Ignatius Academy. He was declared cured of leprosy in the early 1960s.

Guia moved to the Central Luzon Sanitarium in Tala, Caloocan and enrolled at the Holy Rosary College obtaining a degree in education in 1965.

He returned to St. Ignatius Academy in Culion as a teacher and worked there for four decades.

=== Townhood of Culion ===
Guia was an advocate of converting Culion, then part of the town of Coron, into a municipality of its own. He became close friends with another advocate and politician, Ramon Mitra Jr., in the 1960s. Senator Mitra filed a bill in 1971 to make Culion a municipality. However the efforts were frozen when President Ferdinand Marcos declared martial law.

Along with Catholic priest Ignacio Moreta, Guia campaigned to convince the residents of Culion to support the idea. He argued that if Culion became a municipality, this would lessen its dependence on the Department of Health for services and that as a town Culion would have access to the national budget.

After the People Power Revolution of 1986, Mitra became speaker of the House of Representatives and Congressman Dave Ponce de Leon revived the Culion municipality bill. Culion eventually became a municipality in 1992.

=== Mayor of Culion ===
Guia ran in the inaugural mayoral election in May 1995 and bested other candidates who never contracted leprosy. Emiliano Marasigan was his vice mayor.

=== Later life and death ===
After serving as mayor, Guia returned to teaching. He advocated against the social stigma which affected both people afflicted with leprosy and also healthy children who lived in Culion, due to the town's association with leprosy. He died in March 2016.

== Personal life ==
Hilarion Guia was afflicted with leprosy which rendered his hands unusable. He admitted that like others who contracted leprosy, the disease has affected his self-esteem but as of 2006 this is no longer the case.

Guia married Rosalinda Hilao, a daughter of a leper who remained unafflicted of the disease. They did not have biological children but the couple became surrogate parents of five children from different leprosy parents.
