= Epidemiology of leprosy =

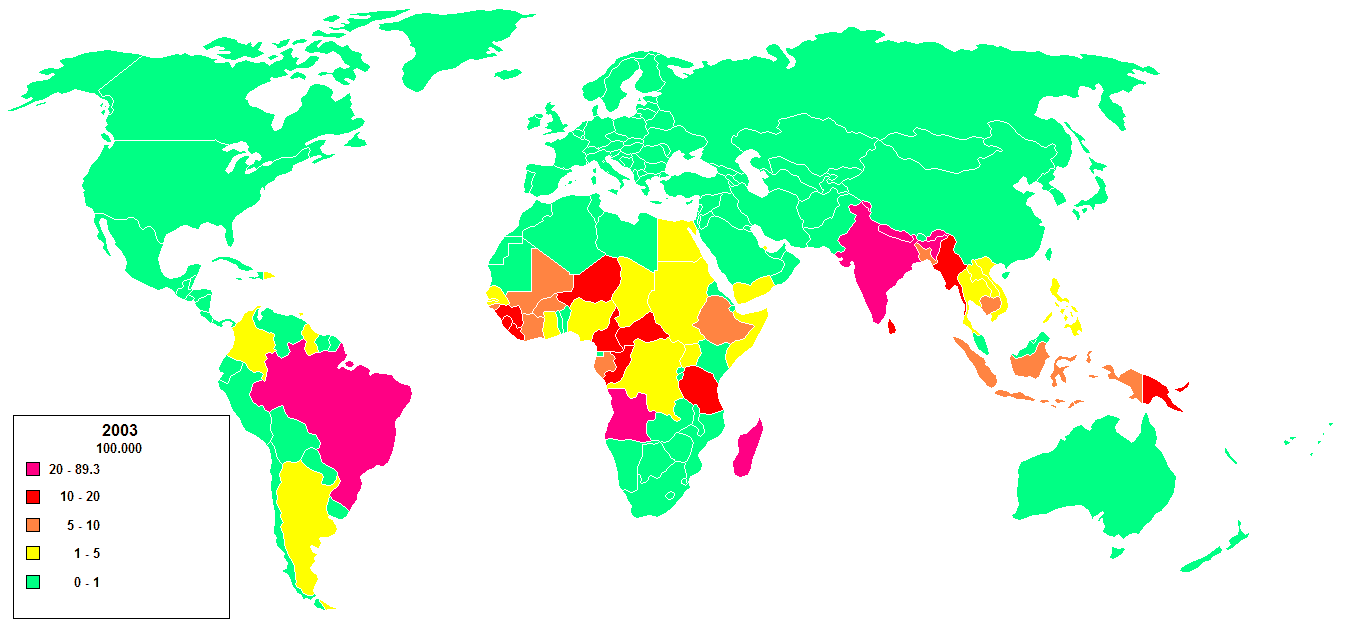
World distribution of leprosy, 2003.

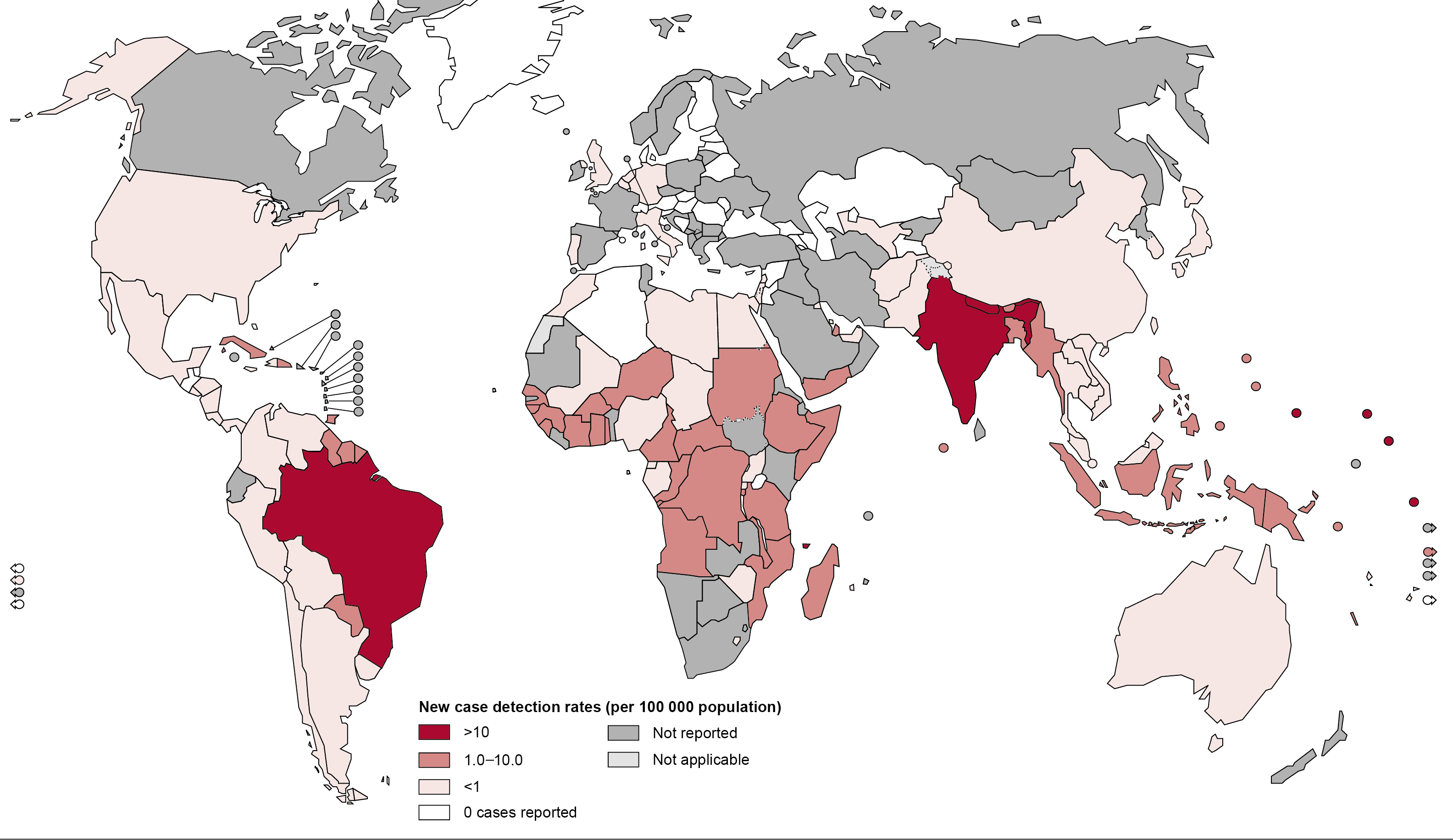
New case of leprosy in 2016.

Disability-adjusted life year for leprosy per 100,000 inhabitants in 2004.: no data <1.5 1.5–3 3–4.5 4.5–6 6–7.5 7.5–9 / 9–10.5 10.5–12 12–13.5 13.5–15 15–20 >20

Worldwide, two to three million people are estimated to be permanently disabled because of leprosy. India has the greatest number of cases, with Brazil second and Indonesia third.

In 1999, the world incidence of leprosy, also known as Hansen's disease, was estimated to be 640,000. In 2000, 738,284 new cases were identified. In 2000, the World Health Organization (WHO) listed 91 countries in which leprosy is endemic. India, Myanmar and Nepal contained 70% of cases. India reports over 50% of the world's leprosy cases. In 2002, 763,917 new cases were detected worldwide, and in that year the WHO listed India, Brazil, Madagascar, Mozambique, Tanzania and Nepal as having 90% of leprosy cases.

According to recent figures from the WHO, 208,619 new cases of leprosy were reported in 2018 from 127 countries. A total of 16,000 new child cases were detected in 2018.

In the United States, leprosy is tracked by the Centers for Disease Control and Prevention (CDC), with a total of 92 cases being reported in 2002. Although the number of cases worldwide continues to fall, pockets of high prevalence continue in certain areas such as Brazil, South Asia (India, Nepal), some parts of Africa (Tanzania, Madagascar, Mozambique) and the western Pacific.

== Risk groups ==
At highest risk are those living in endemic areas with poor conditions such as inadequate bedding, contaminated water and insufficient diet, or other diseases (such as HIV) that compromise immune function. Recent research suggests that there is a defect in cell-mediated immunity that causes susceptibility to the disease. Less than ten percent of the world's population is actually capable of acquiring the disease.

The region of DNA responsible for this variability is also involved in Parkinson disease, giving rise to current speculation that the two disorders may be linked in some way at the biochemical level. In addition, men are twice as likely to contract leprosy as women. According to The Leprosy Mission Canada, most people – about 95% of the population – are naturally immune.

== Disease burden ==
Although the number of new leprosy cases occurring each year is important as a measure of transmission, it is difficult to measure in leprosy due to its long incubation period, delays in diagnosis after onset of the disease and the lack of laboratory tools to detect leprosy in its very early stages. Instead, the registered prevalence is used. Registered prevalence is a useful proxy indicator of the disease burden as it reflects the number of active leprosy cases diagnosed with the disease and receiving treatment with MDT at a given point in time. The prevalence rate is defined as the number of cases registered for MDT treatment among the population in which the cases have occurred, again at a given point in time.

New case detection is another indicator of the disease that is usually reported by countries on an annual basis. It includes cases diagnosed with onset of disease in the year in question (true incidence) and a large proportion of cases with onset in previous years (termed a backlog prevalence of undetected cases).

Endemic countries also report the number of new cases with established disabilities at the time of detection, as an indicator of the backlog prevalence. Determination of the time of onset of the disease is generally unreliable, is very labor-intensive and is seldom done in recording these statistics.

== Global situation ==
Table 1: Prevalence at beginning of 2006, and trends in new case detection 2001–2005, and 2010, excluding Europe [registered prevalence is the national total of chronic cases]
Region	Registered prevalence (cases per 10,000 pop.)	New case detection during the year					
Region	Start of 2006	2001	2002	2003	2004	2005	2010
Africa	40,830 (0.56)	39,612	48,248	47,006	46,918	42,814	25,345
Americas	32,904 (0.39)	42,830	39,939	52,435	52,662	41,780	37,740
South-East Asia	133,422 (0.81)	668,658	520,632	405,147	298,603	201,635	156,254
Eastern Mediterranean	4,024 (0.09)	4,758	4,665	3,940	3,392	3,133	4,080
Western Pacific	8,646 (0.05)	7,404	7,154	6,190	6,216	7,137	5,055
Totals	219,826	763,262	620,638	514,718	407,791	296,499	228,474

Table 2: Prevalence and detection, countries still to reach elimination. [registered prevalence is the national total of chronic cases]
Countries	Registered prevalence (cases per 10,000 pop.)			New case detection (rate/100,000 pop.)		
Countries	Start of 2004	Start of 2005	Start of 2006	During 2003	During 2004	During 2005
Brazil	79,908 (4.6)	30,693 (1.7)	27,313 (1.5)	49,206 (28.6)	49,384 (26.9)	38,410 (20.6)
Mozambique	6,810 (3.4)	4,692 (2.4)	4,889 (2.5)	5,907 (29.4)	4,266 (22.0)	5,371 (27.1)
Nepal	7,549 (3.1)	4,699 (1.8)	4,921 (1.8)	8,046 (32.9)	6,958 (26.2)	6,150 (22.7)
Tanzania	5,420 (1.6)	4,777 (1.3)	4,190 (1.1)	5,279 (15.4)	5,190 (13.8)	4,237 (11.1)
Totals	NA	NA	NA	NA	NA	NA

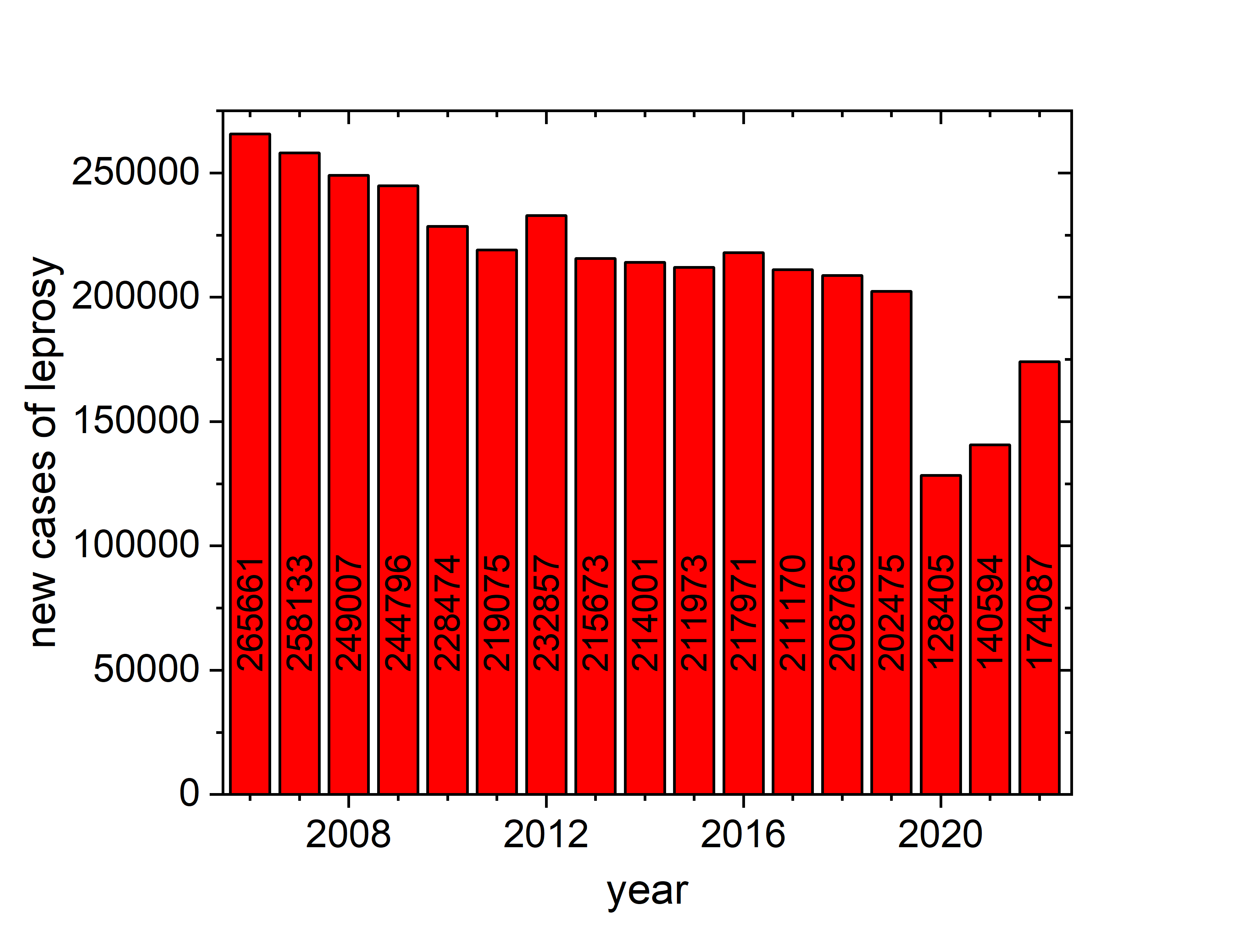
Plot of global new registered cases of leprosy per year, 2006–2022

As reported to WHO by 115 countries and territories in 2006, and published in the Weekly Epidemiological Record, the global registered prevalence of leprosy at the beginning of the year was 219,826 cases. New-case detection during the previous year (2005 – the last year for which full country information is available) was 296,499. The reason for the annual detections being higher than the prevalence at the end of the year can be explained by the fact that a proportion of new cases complete their treatment within the year and, therefore, no longer remain on the registers. The global detection of new cases continues to show a sharp decline, falling by 110,000 cases (27%) during 2005 compared with the previous year.

Table 1 shows that global annual detection has been declining since 2001. The African region reported an 8.7% decline in the number of new cases compared with 2004. The comparable figure for the Americas was 20.1%, for South-East Asia 32%, and for the Eastern Mediterranean 7.6%. The Western Pacific area, however, showed a 14.8% increase during the same period.

Table 2 shows the leprosy situation in the four major countries that have yet to achieve the goal of elimination at the national level. Elimination is defined as a prevalence of less than 1 case per 10,000 population. Madagascar reached elimination at the national level in September 2006. Nepal detection reported from mid-November 2004 to mid-November 2005. D.R. Congo officially reported to WHO in 2008 that it had reached elimination by the end of 2007 at the national level.

== South America ==
=== Argentina ===
In 2013, there were 550 cases, of which 277 were considered as new cases. Between 350 and 400 cases of leprosy are diagnosed every year. In 1926 the law 11,359 ordered compulsory quarantine for the leper, that law was abolished by the law 22,964 in 1983, that ordered compulsory quarantine for the leper only if they refuse medical indications and involve some risk for the healthy population.

Five leper colonies were built:

- Pedro L. Baliña, Posadas, Misiones, opened on February 6, 1938.
- José J. Puente, San Francisco del Chañar, Córdoba, opened on March 18, 1939.
- Maximiliano Aberastury, Isla del Cerrito, Chaco, opened on March 30, 1939.
- Baldomero Sommer, General Rodríguez, Buenos Aires, opened on November 21, 1941.
- Enrique Fidanza, Colonia Ensayo, Entre Ríos opened on March 28, 1948.

Only the Baldomero Sommer continues serving as a leper colony.

=== Brazil ===
Leprosy is a serious public health problem in Brazil. Between 2001 and 2013, over 500,000 cases were reported and in 2015 alone, over 25,000 cases were diagnosed. There is evidence of hidden prevalence of leprosy.

== Asia ==
=== People's Republic of China ===
The People's Republic of China has many leprosy recovered patients who have been isolated from the rest of society. In the 1950s, the Chinese Communist government created "Recovered Villages" in rural remote mountaintops for the recovered patients. Although leprosy is now curable with the advent of the multi-drug treatment, the villagers remain because they have been stigmatized by the outside world. Health NGOs such as Joy in Action have arisen in China to especially focus on improving the conditions of "Recovered Villages". The number of leprosy cases in China has been showing a steady decline over recent years, with a prevalence of 2697 registered cases in 2017 which is a 55.3% reduction compared to that in 2010.

=== India ===
British India enacted the Leprosy Act of 1898 which institutionalized those affected and segregated them by sex to prevent reproduction. The Act was difficult to enforce but was repealed in 1983 only after MDT had become widely available. In 1983, the National Leprosy Elimination Programme, previously the National Leprosy Control Programme, changed its methods from surveillance to the treatment of people with leprosy. India reported a far larger decline in leprosy cases than any other country – from 473,658 new cases in 2002 to 161,457 in 2005. According to WHO, 16 million people worldwide were cured of leprosy since the past 20 years. India has estimated three million people with disability or health issues stemming from leprosy. India announced that leprosy had been "eliminated as a public health problem," meaning that there would be fewer than one new case per 10,000 people (as defined by the WHO). Reported new cases exceed 125,000 per year (60% of the world total). 135,485 new leprosy cases were detected in India in 2017.

=== Malaysia ===
Malaysia was announced to be eliminated of leprosy by WHO in 1994, which signifies a reduction in the prevalence rate of the disease to less than 1 case per 10,000 people. However, it was reported that there is a rise in incidence across the country over recent years, reaching 1.02 cases per 10,000 people in 2014.

== Europe ==
=== Portugal ===
The Hospital-Colónia Rovisco Pais (the Rovisco Pais Hospital–Colony) was founded in Portugal in 1947 as a national center for the treatment of leprosy. It was renamed in 2007 as the Centro de Medicina de Reabilitação da Região Centro-Rovisco Pais. It still retains a leprosy service in which 25 ex patients live. Between 1988 and 2003 102 patients were treated in Portugal for leprosy.

=== Spain ===
The Sanatorio de Fontilles (Fontilles Sanatorium) in Spain was founded in 1902 and admitted its first patient in 1909. In 2002, the Sanatorio had 68 in-patients in the Sanatorium, and more than 150 receiving out-patient treatment. A small number of cases continue to be reported.

=== Greece ===
Two indigenous cases were reported from Greece in 2009.

=== France ===
One case was reported in France in 2009

=== Germany ===
Leprosy was almost eradicated in most of Europe by 1700 but sometime after 1850 leprosy was re introduced into East Prussia by Lithuanian rural workers immigrating from the Russian empire. The first leprosarium was founded in 1899 in Memel (now Klaipėda in Lithuania). Legislation was introduced in 1900 and 1904 requiring patients to be isolated and not allowed to work with others.

=== United Kingdom ===
The last confirmed case of Leprosy being transmitted within the UK was in 1953. Between 2003 & 2012, an average of 139 cases/year of leprosy were diagnosed (and notified) in the UK, none of which are believed to have been acquired within the UK. The UK's national referral service for leprosy is run by Prof. Diana Lockwood, the UK's only Leprologist, at the Hospital for Tropical Diseases, London.

=== Malta ===
The first documented case of leprosy (erga corpore morbi leprae) in Malta in a Gozitan woman (Garita Xejbais) was in 1492 but it is certain that it was present on the island before this time. The next recorded case was in 1630 in a Dominican friar. A report in 1687 recorded five cases. A further three cases were reported in 1808. Between 1839 and 1858 an additional seven cases were recorded. In 1890, a population survey recorded a total of 69 cases. A later survey in 1957 identified 151 people infected with leprosy.

In June 1972, an eradication programme was started. The project was based on the work of Enno Freerksen, Director of the Borsal Institute in Hamburg. Dr Freerksen's earlier trial had used rifampicin, izoniazid, dapsone and prothionamide. The Malta project used rifampicin, dapsone and clofamazine. The project formally concluded in 1999 having treated about 300 patients.

=== Romania ===
The last leper colony in Europe is at Tichileşti, Romania. Until 1991, patients were not allowed to leave the colony. At this colony patients get food, a place to sleep, clothes and medical attention. Some live in long pavilions and others in houses with vegetable and flower gardens. There are two churches in the colony – Orthodox and Baptist – and a farm where the colony grows its own corn.

== North America ==
=== Canada ===
There were cases of leprosy in Atlantic Canada at the end of the nineteenth century, beginning in 1815. The patients were first housed on Sheldrake Island in the Miramichi River and later transferred to Tracadie. Catholic nuns (the religieuses hospitalières de Saint-Joseph, RHSJ) came to take care of the sick. They opened the first French-language hospital in New Brunswick and many more followed. Many hospitals opened by the RHSJ nuns are still in use today. The last hospital to house lepers in Tracadie was demolished in 1991. Its lazaretto section had been closed since 1965. In a century of existence, it had housed not only Acadian victims of the disease, but people from all over Canada as well as sick immigrants from Iceland, Russia and China, among other nations.

Cape Breton Island also suffered an outbreak, in the Lake Ainslie region. Nine people were affected, but it died out soon after 1882. Another outbreak of twenty cases occurred in the Lake O'Law region around 1852.

=== United States ===
In the United States, the first definite reference to the disease was in Florida in 1758. In 2004, there were 131 total cases of the disease in the United States. Of the 131 cases, two-thirds were male. Also out of the 131 cases, 25 (19%) were of individuals who were born in the country. Mexico (18.3%), Micronesia (11.5%), Brazil (9.2%), and the Philippines (7.6%) were the next leading countries where those with the disease were originally born. A total of 20 cases were found to be white, not of Hispanic origin. As of October, 2005, 3,604 patients on the United States registry were currently receiving care. In 2018 there are about 5,000 people who no longer have leprosy but have long-term complications of disease and continue to receive care. The disease is tracked by the Centers for Disease Control and Prevention (CDC), with a total of 166 new cases reported in the US in 2005. Most (100 or 60%) of these new cases were reported in California, Louisiana, Massachusetts, New York, and Texas.
