= Herbert Wade (medical doctor) =

American medical doctor (1886–1968)

Herbert Windsor Wade (born Haddonfield, New Jersey, November 23, 1886; died Culion, Philippines, June 8, 1968) was an American medical doctor notable for his work on leprosy. He served as medical director of the Culion leper colony from 1922 to 1959.

== Early career ==
Starting in 1906, Wade trained as a tissue pathologist with Frank Burr Mallory at the Boston City Hospital. In 1908 he moved to Montreal to assist Charles Duval, an associate of Mallory's. He began medical studies at McGill University there, and continued at Tulane University when Duval moved there in 1909. Wade received his medical degree from Tulane in 1912 and remained there for three more years as an instructor in pathology and a resident at the Charity Hospital at New Orleans. During his time at Tulane Wade became interested in leprosy research, which was an interest of his mentor Duval. Wade developed a relationship with the leprosy colony at Carville, Louisiana, then known as the Louisiana Leper Home.

== Philippines ==
In 1915, Wade married Dorothy Paul of New Orleans and accepted a job as a pathologist-bacteriologist at the Bureau of Science in Manila. Once he arrived in 1916 he was quickly appointed the chairman of the Leprosy Examining Committee of the Board of Health of Manila. In the course of his duties he developed the "scraped incision" method of making skin smears, an important advance in detection. In 1918 Wade was appointed head of the Department of Pathology and Bacteriology at the College of Medicine and Surgery at the University of the Philippines.

In 1922 Wade and his wife moved to Culion, where he had been appointed chief physician. He was to be engaged in research there for the rest of his life. In 1925 Governor Leonard Wood sent Dorothy Wade back to the United States to raise money for leprosy treatment and research; in association with fundraiser Perry Burgess, they founded an organization which became (after Leonard Wood's death in 1927) the Leonard Wood Memorial for the Eradication of Leprosy, with Dr. Wade as the chief medical officer. The funds raised supported the Leonard Wood Memorial Research Laboratory at Culion, which Wade headed.

Wade was the chairman of the Leonard Wood Memorial Conference on Leprosy in Manila in 1931, which resulted in the founding of the International Leprosy Foundation. Wade became the first editor of the Foundation's International Journal of Leprosy and remained involved with it until 1963. From 1946 to 1963 he was the president of the International Leprosy Foundation.

== Legacy ==
The palm Cycas wadei, found near the Culion colony, was named in Wade's honor.
