= Perry Burgess =

American minister, fundraiser, writer, and authority on leprosy (1886–1962)

- Born: October 12, 1886; Joplin, Missouri, U.S.
- Died: September 15, 1962 (aged 75); Unionville, Ohio, U.S.
- Education: Baker University

Clarence Perry Burgess (October 12, 1886, Joplin, Missouri – September 15, 1962, Unionville, Ohio) was an American minister, fundraiser, writer, and authority on leprosy. His 1940 book Who Walk Alone won a National Book Award for Nonfiction, the Bookseller Discovery Award.

== Early life ==
Burgess was the son of George W. and Cora Osborne Burgess. His father was a prominent businessman in Joplin. At age 16 Burgess became a preacher and eventually earned enough money to put himself through college. In 1906 Burgess married Helen Noble in Joplin; they had two children, Esther and Elizabeth. He attended Baker University in Baldwin, Kansas, graduating in 1912. His first major position was as head of a national campaign for Near East Relief from 1917-1920. Over the next few years he raised money to support Wilfred Grenfell's work in Newfoundland and to feed German children.

== Leprosy ==
In 1925 he met Dorothy Paul Wade, the wife of Dr. H. W. Wade, chief medical officer of the Culion leper colony in the Philippines; she had been asked by Major-General Leonard Wood, Governor-General of the Philippines, to raise money for new buildings and for research into a cure for leprosy. Burgess became the head of the fundraising committee, which became the Leonard Wood Memorial for the Eradication of Leprosy after Wood's death in 1927.

Money from the Leonard Wood Memorial supported the Culion colony and helped build another colony on Cebu and supported research at the colonies. In 1931 Burgess organized the Leonard Wood Memorial Conference on Leprosy in Manila, which led to the organization of the International Leprosy Foundation and the International Journal of Leprosy, for which the Leonard Wood Memorial provided financial support.

Burgess travelled extensively to observe leprosaria worldwide, published articles in popular and scientific journals about leprosy, and in 1940 wrote the novel "Who Walk Alone" about a fictional American soldier who contracts leprosy while in the Philippines and becomes a resident of the Culion leper colony. The novel won the "Bookseller Discovery Award" at the National Book Awards. By about 1960 it had been translated into over 50 languages and had been published in Braille and in audio on records. He also wrote an autobiography in 1951 titled "Born of Those Years: An Autobiography". Burgess retired in 1958 for health reasons.

== Second marriage ==
In May 1937 Burgess married Cora Turney Bateman (1910-1962) of Madison, Ohio; he adopted Cora's children from her first marriage, Coralyn and John (who adopted the name Perry Burgess Jr.). They lived on the "Erie Vista" estate in Geneva-on-the-Lake, Ohio which had been the home of Cora's grandfather.

Burgess and his wife are buried in Middle Ridge Cemetery in Madison, Ohio.
