= Eliodoro Mercado =

Filipino physician and army surgeon

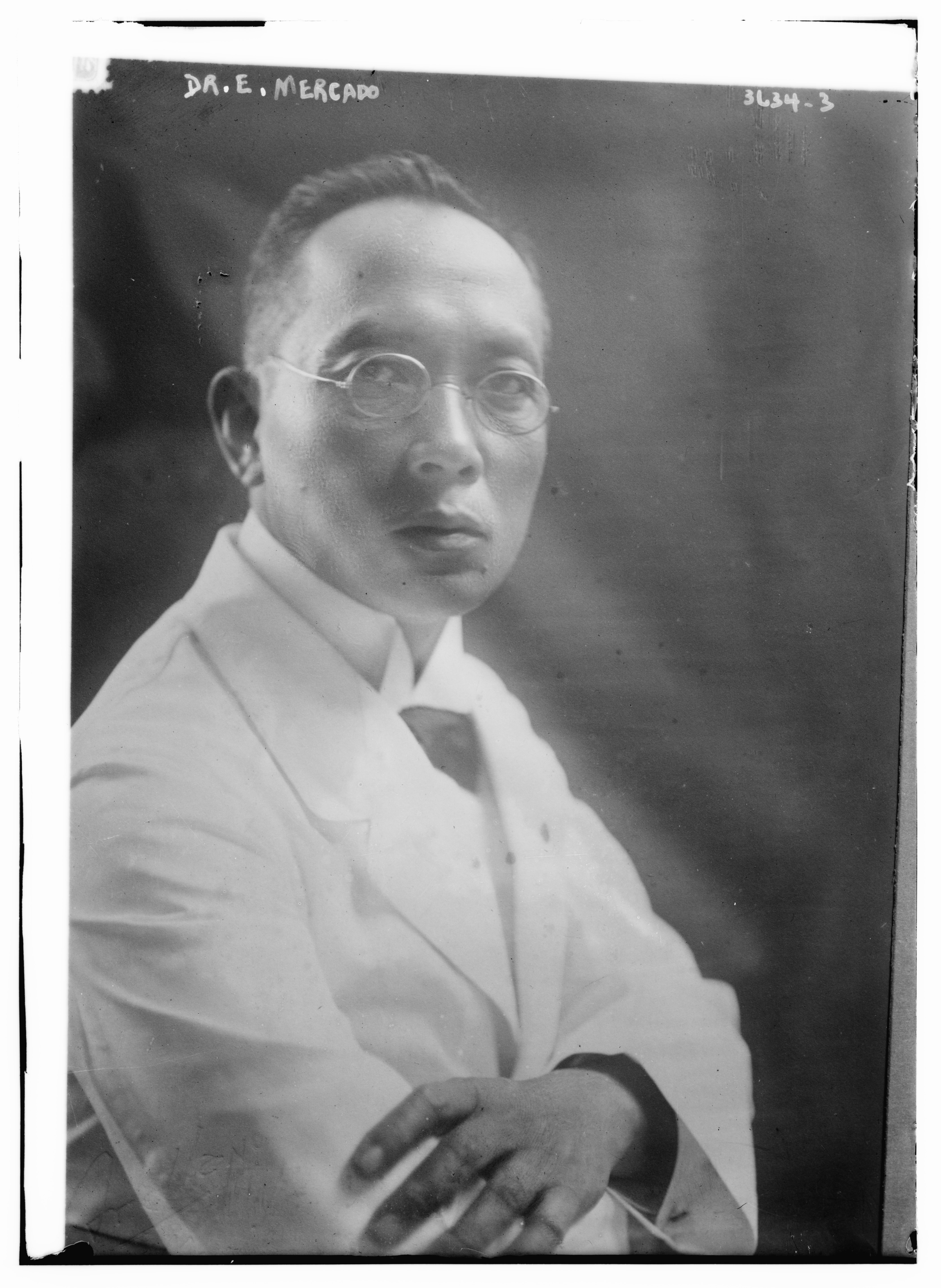
- Mercado, published by Bain News Service, c. 1910
- Born: Eliodoro Mercado y Donato; 3 July 1866; Manila, Philippines
- Died: March 13, 1933 (aged 38); Manila, Philippines
- Resting place: La Loma Cemetery
- Education: Colegio de San Juan de Letran (BA); University of Santo Tomas
- Occupations: physician, army surgeon, medical researcher
- Works: Leprosy in the Philippines and its Treatment (1914); Algunas Observaciones Sobre la Recivida de la Lepra (1917)
- Scientific career
- Fields: Medicine
- Workplaces: University of Santo Tomas; Colegio Medico Farmaceutico de Filipinas; Bureau of Health

Eliodoro Donato Mercado (1866–1933), or Eliodoro Mercado y Donato, was a Filipino physician and army surgeon. Along with Victor Heiser, he developed a method of injecting chaulmoogra oil to treat leprosy. His work, titled Leprosy in the Philippines and its Treatment, was published in 1914. He was regarded as the "greatest leprologist of the Philippines," according to Zoilo M. Galang.

He was also a founding member of the Colegio Médico-Farmacéutico of the Philippines and a former supernumerary surgeon in the Spanish Army.

== Biography ==
Born in Santa Cruz, Manila, on July 3, 1866, he was one of the prominent graduates of the University of Santo Tomas during the early years of its medical course, which began in 1871.

He first studied at Colegio de San Juan de Letran from 1883 to 1885. Mercado served at the San Juan de Dios Hospital in 1885, where he treated cholera cases. As a medical student during the 1882 cholera epidemic in Manila, Mercado described how people would avoid Calle Cervantes and the San Lazaro estate due to the unbearable stench of decaying bodies.

He graduated from the University of Santo Tomas in 1893. On October 1, 1898, he became an auxiliary surgeon for the Spanish military in Malate, Manila. At the request of Trinidad Pardo de Tavera, he worked at makeshift hospitals in Pandacan, Tayuman, and Bambang. In 1900, he became a resident physician in the Leper Department at San Lazaro Hospital. He was later appointed to the Philippine civil service under Secretary of the Interior Dean Conant Worcester. In 1903, Mercado passed his medical board exam and spent the majority of his career at the hospital.

He died in 1933 in Manila.

== Research ==
Victor Heiser, who was the Chief Quarantine Officer and Director of Health for the Philippine Islands at the time, visited the Louisiana Leprosy Home. There, he gained a favorable impression of using chaulmoogra oil for leprosy patients and learned improved techniques for administering the oil orally from Ralph Hopkins and Isadore Dyer.

Mercado, who was in charge as a physician at San Lazaro Hospital in Manila, assisted Heiser in conducting a thorough trial of the oil on leprosy patients. The new method was introduced at the hospital in 1909. The results were successful, but oral administration caused nausea and resistance among patients in taking the drug. Physicians at the hospital also attempted hypodermic injections, but the oil was not satisfactorily absorbed.

Later, both Heiser and Mercado created a camphor-resorcin solution of chaulmoogra oil. The results were positive, as the solution was readily absorbed. After the first case was treated, Heiser wrote in his autobiography:

Few can imagine with what a thrill we watched the first case to which chaulmoogra was administered in hypodermic form, how we watched for the first faint suspicion of eyebrows beginning to grow in again and sensation returning to paralyzed areas.

In 1913, Heiser published the first two cases in Public Health Reports. According to his publication, leprosy bacilli were no longer found in clinical microscopic examinations of the two patients. As for Mercado, his findings were published in 1914 and presented at the Second Regional Assembly of Filipino physicians and pharmacists.

=== Reception ===
Worcester sent a message to U.S. President William Howard Taft in February 1912, referencing Assembly Bill No. 1043. The bill concerned the allocation of 30,000 pesos for testing the "Mercado mixture." He also praised Mercado for his loyalty to the Bureau of Health.

== Legacy ==
The "Mercado mixture," named after him, was a treatment for leprosy first developed in the Philippines. It consists of 60 cubic centimeters of chaulmoogra oil, camphorated oil, and 4 grams of resorcin. While it initially showed promise with a high recovery rate, according to Heiser in 1914, many patients experienced relapses. Later reports indicated some improvement or arrest of the disease, but the method was painful and not considered a cure. Nevertheless, the mixture was considered a milestone in further studies on the therapeutic effects of chaulmoogra oil.

Heiser took most of the credit for the "Mercado mixture," which led to his nomination for the 1931 Nobel Prize in Physiology and Medicine. Philippine biographer and historian Carlos Quirino stated:

...Researched on the subject of leprosy until his death. In the opinion of one biographer, Mercado deserved the Nobel prize for his research on that disease...

— Carlos Quirino, Who's who in Philippine history (1995)
