= Victor Heiser =

American physician

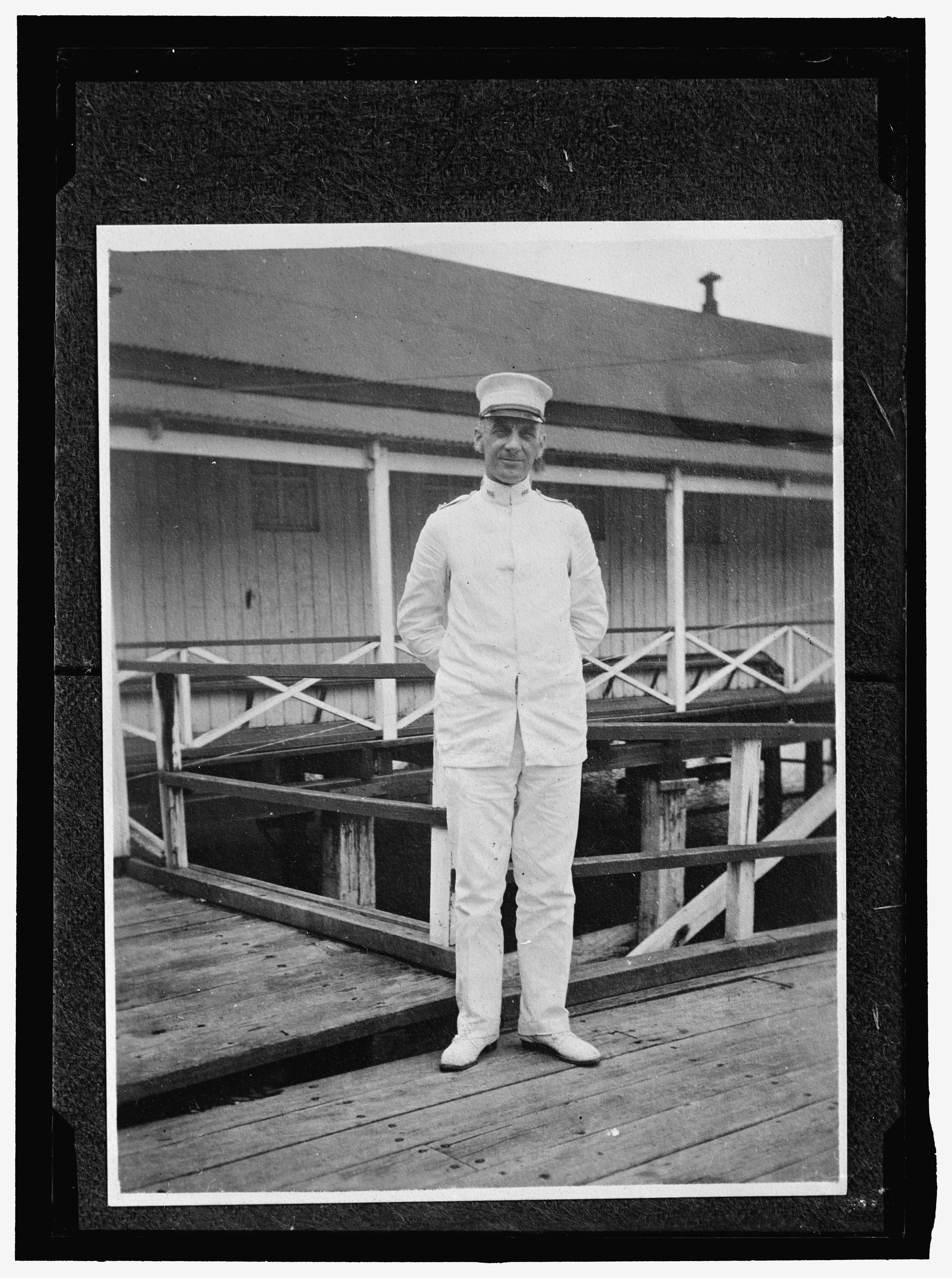
- Born: February 5, 1873; Johnstown, Cambria County, Pennsylvania, United States
- Died: February 27, 1972 (aged 99); Brooklyn, Kings County, New York

Victor Heiser (February 5, 1873 – February 27, 1972; born Victor George Heiser in Johnstown, Cambria County, Pennsylvania) was an American physician and author. He was a survivor of the Johnstown flood of 1889.

After graduating medical school Heiser, with interest in leprosy, became the Philippine director of health. In this capacity he also ran the Culion leper colony and traveled the world many times over. He kept journals, wrote memoirs, reports, and was the author of several books.

== Biography ==
Heiser was a survivor of the catastrophic Johnstown flood of 1889. Prior to that day he wanted to be a watch maker in town. He was in his family's barn when he glanced toward the house and noticed his father at a second story window frantically gesturing at him to climb to the roof of the barn. He did so in time. The flood swept away his family home and barn. He survived by riding the flood wave downstream on the roof of the barn and jumping from the barn onto the roof of a building that was floating by. The building collided with debris that piled up on the Stone Bridge at Johnstown and he was able to jump on other debris. The pile caught fire and became a funeral pyre. Victor had jumped onto some debris that dislodged and he floated down the river again finally jumping yet again on to a house where he spent the night in the attic with 19 other survivors. He lost his family in the flood, becoming an orphan at sixteen, and his family's store was destroyed. He helped for several with the recovery and cleanup.

Heiser went on to graduate from the Jefferson Medical College (now, Sidney Kimmel Medical College) in Philadelphia. Heiser was fluent in several languages. After joining the Public Health Service, he soon was screening immigrants for infectious diseases at Ellis Island and in Italy. He implemented public health programs to combat smallpox, plague, cholera, malaria, beriberi, leprosy, and other afflictions. He was elected to the American Philosophical Society in 1918. He was an eyewitness source to historian David McCullough for his 1968 book, The Johnstown Flood, built the public-health system for the American colonial government in the Philippines between 1903 and 1915 and later worked for the Rockefeller Foundation.

=== Early life ===
Victor was born to George Heiser (1836–1889) and Mathilde Lorentz Heiser (1849–1889), and there was a sister Johanna Heiser (1870–1874), that died at four years of age.

== Philippines ==
American forces took over the Philippines in September 1898. On October 27, 1902, Heiser became the Philippine director of health and took over authority for establishing a leprosarium, called the Culion leper colony. Because of delays construction did not start until 1905, and the first 370 patients began to be transported to the island on May 27, 1906. At a point there were 3,000 workers, over 5,000 patients, and including 200 doctors on the island. The island had become known as the Island of No Return. Heiser served under Governor-General of the Philippines Leonard Wood (October 14, 1927, to August 7, 1927) for one year before being replaced by Herbert Windsor Wade as medical director (1922 to 1959) and the colony was finally reinstated into the population in 1998.

Heiser worked to find a cure for leprosy while treating many other diseases in the process. He is credited with saving as many as two million lives.

== Marriage ==
Heiser married a wealthy widow, Marion Peterson Phinny, and they divided their time between New York and Connecticut until her death in 1965.

== Death ==
Heiser died on February 27, 1972, and was buried at the Grandview Cemetery in Johnstown.

== Legacy ==
After Heiser died his will established The Heiser Program for Research in Leprosy within The New York Community Trust. The program provides funding research for leprosy and other related diseases. In 2015 funding was appropriated for those seeking funding for research.

== Published works ==
- An American Doctor's Odyssey: Adventures in Forty-Five Countries (1936)
- You're the doctor (1939): 300 pages; New York, W.W. Norton and Company, Inc. (J.Cape in London)
- Rockefeller Foundation (1915–1934)
- Toughen up, America! (1941) :New York, London, Whittlesey House
- Leprosy in the Philippine Islands (August 13, 1909): Public Health Reports (1896–1970); Published by: Association of Schools of Public Health Vol. 24, No. 33, pp. 1155–1159 (5 pages)

== See also ==
- History of the Philippines (1898–1946)
