= Separatio Leprosorum =

Ceremony and shunning

The Separatio Leprosorum was a ceremony performed during the Middle Ages whenever a person was declared a leper by their community. The individual was ritually buried by the community and exiled to the edge of the settlement. The term also applies to the subsequent shunning of the individuals. Separatio Leprosorum was first practised following the Lombard Edict of Rothari in 643, which devoted a chapter to the treatment of lepers. The practice spread throughout Christian Europe through decrees by Charlemagne and an inclusion in the Sachsenspiegel.

Before the ritual took place, the individual had to be confirmed as having the disease by a council, usually composed of physicians, other lepers, or as a last resort, priests. Following the confirmation, the leper was given several days to prepare. At the end of this period, he or she was led to an open grave at the local cemetery. The leper entered the grave, and three shovels of earth were thrown onto the person's head. The attendant priest would conduct a funeral service for the individual, at the conclusion declaring "sis mortuus mundo, vivens iterum Deo" (Dead to the world, reborn to God). The leper would respond with a request to be "reborn on the final day". The priest would ask those gathered not to injure the leper but to have "remembrance of the human condition and the formidable judgment of God" and "to provide liberally for his needs". Those present would provide alms for the "deceased" and offer a prayer. The leper then donned a costume indicating their status, generally a sackcloth robe emblazoned with an identifying mark, a bell which they were to ring on approaching anyone (accompanied by a shouted warning of "Unclean"), a cross, and an alms box.

After the ritual, the leper was in most legal systems "dead", with regards to their rights to inherit property. The leper was then led to the site of their exile, typically at the edge of the community, where they would plant the cross and alms box, and where they were to remain at all times. The exile was generally lifted for several days at Easter, though should the leper wish to enter the community, they were forced to wear the identifying costume and bell. Later, leprosariums were established which would accept those presumed to have the disease.
