= Tichilești, Tulcea =

Leper colony in Romania

Coordinates: 45°15′47″N 28°21′28″E

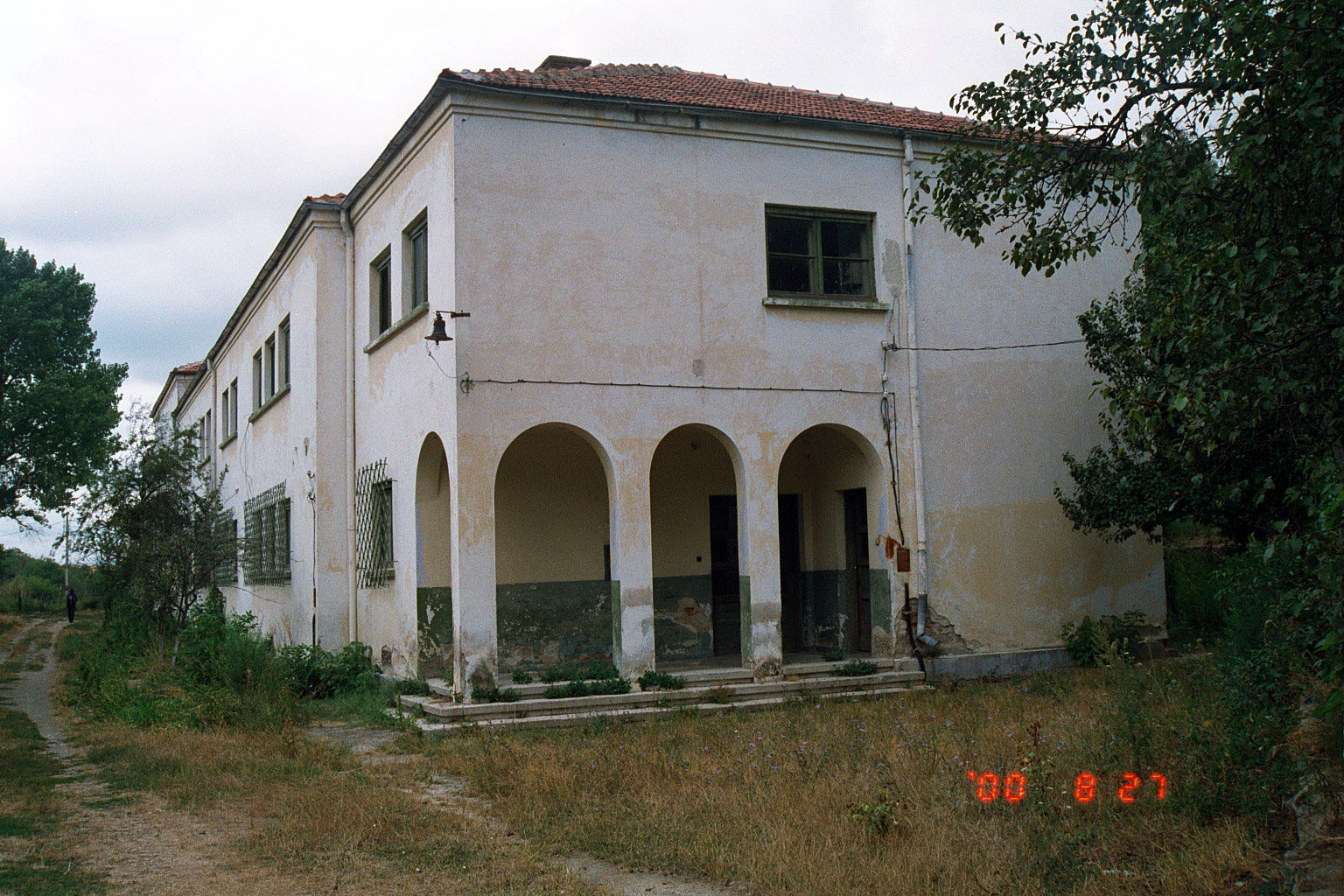
Church in the Tichilești leper colony

Tichilești is a leper colony in Isaccea, Tulcea County, Romania, having 9 inhabitants as of December 2023. Although officially a hospital, Tichilești appears to be more like a small village, and is formally administered as a village by Isaccea. Tichilești was founded as a monastery, in 1875 becoming a leper colony.

== Name ==
Tichilești's name is derived from the Turkish name of the settlement, Tekeli is derived from the Turkish word teke, meaning "he-goat".

== History ==
Tichilești was founded as a monastery, in 1875 becoming a leper colony. A legend says the monastery was founded by one of the Cantacuzino princesses who was affected by leprosy. Another theory of the history the settlement is that a group of Russian refugees (see Lipovans) settled there and founded the monastery, but soon became outlaws who were eventually caught.

In 1918, for unknown reasons, a part of the lepers moved to Largeanca, near the Bessarabian town of Ismail, while the rest of them being allegedly killed and their bodies being burned or thrown in a lime pit.

Following a 1926 newspaper article by F. Brunea-Fox, a journalist who lived with the lepers for three weeks, a hospital was built in 1928 at the monastery. The houses and the central courtyard were built in the 1930s.

In July 1932, a group of 25 starving lepers from Tichilești threatened to march to Bucharest and entered the town of Isaccea demanding food. Local grocers and farmers had stopped supplying them food because the government had not been providing funding. The Isacceans barred their houses until the military escorted the lepers back to their colony.

Initially, the lepers were not allowed to leave the colony. This changed in 1991, but many residents, who had lived most of their lives in the colony, continued living there.

European Union funds came to Tichilești in the decade following the year 2000, and they were able to install bathrooms, refrigerators, and satellite television, and to put air-conditioners in the canteen.

== Demographics ==
The last case of leprosy in Romania was diagnosed in 1981 and the age of the patients in Tichilești in 2002 ranged between 37 and 90, most of them having an age of more than 60 years. In Tichilești there are two churches, an Orthodox one and a Baptist one. A cure for leprosy has been known for a long time, however the disease was too advanced for these people who live in Tichilești. As a result they were not cured but it made it no longer contagious. As of 2023, there are still nine people living at the colony, most of whom are very elderly.

=== Population ===
- 1930: 200
- 1998: 39
- 2002: 22
- 2011: 19
- 2017: 10
- 2019: 9
- 2023: 9
