= Culion =

Municipality in Palawan, Philippines

- Municipality
- Municipality of Culion
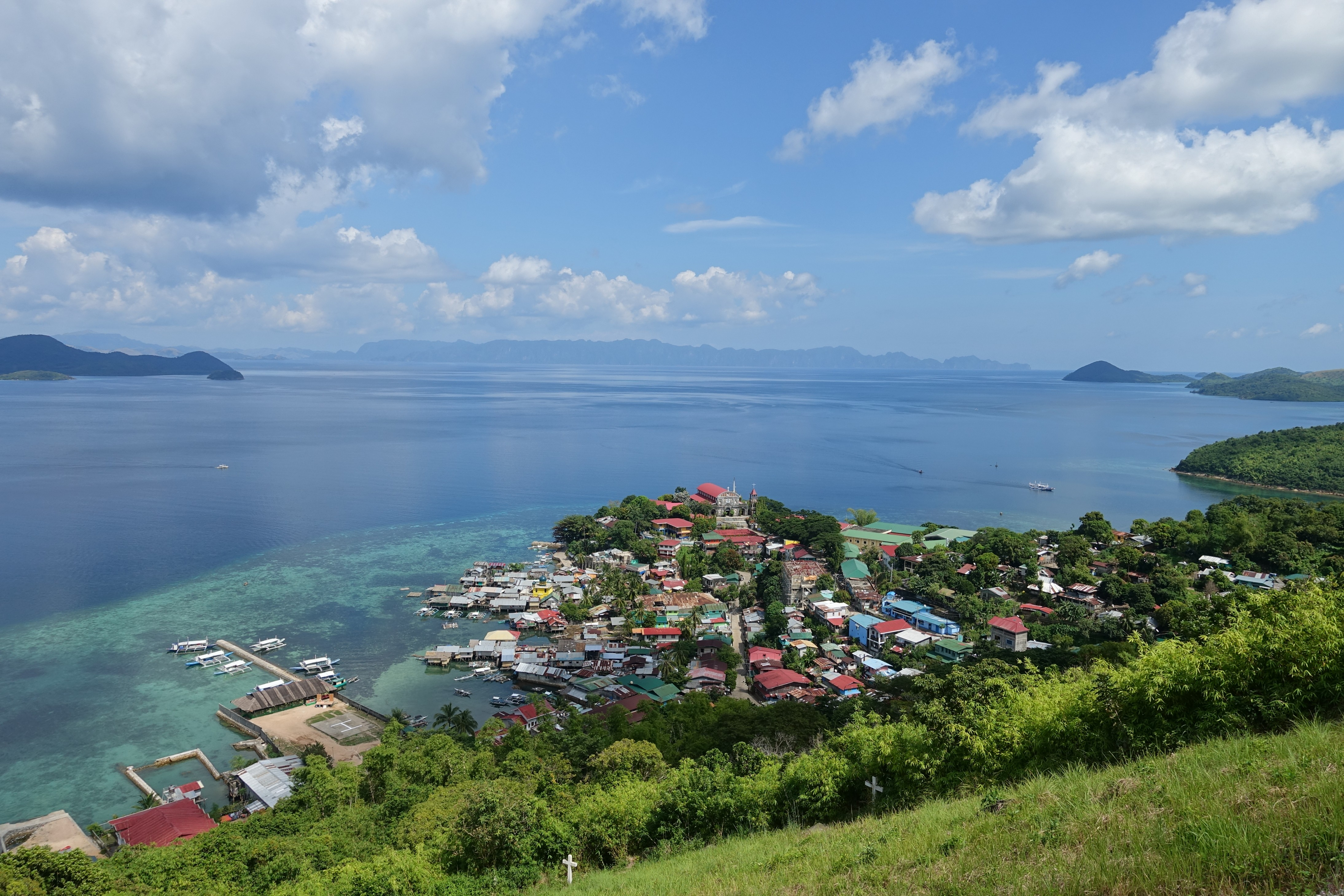
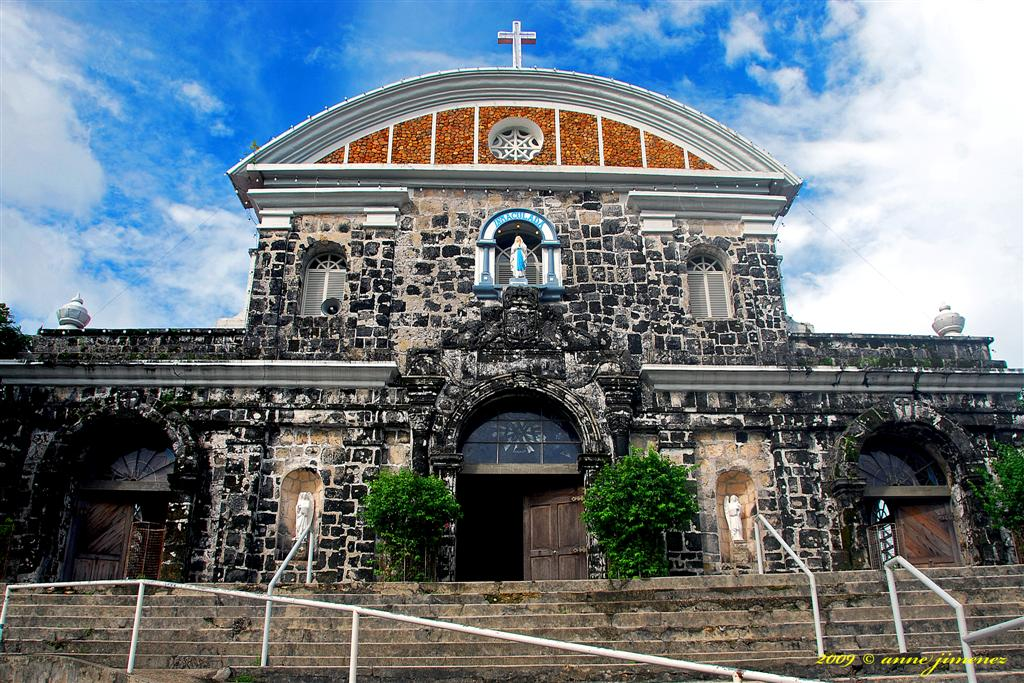
- Culion Skyline La Imaculada Concepcion Church Coastline near Dicabaito Channel

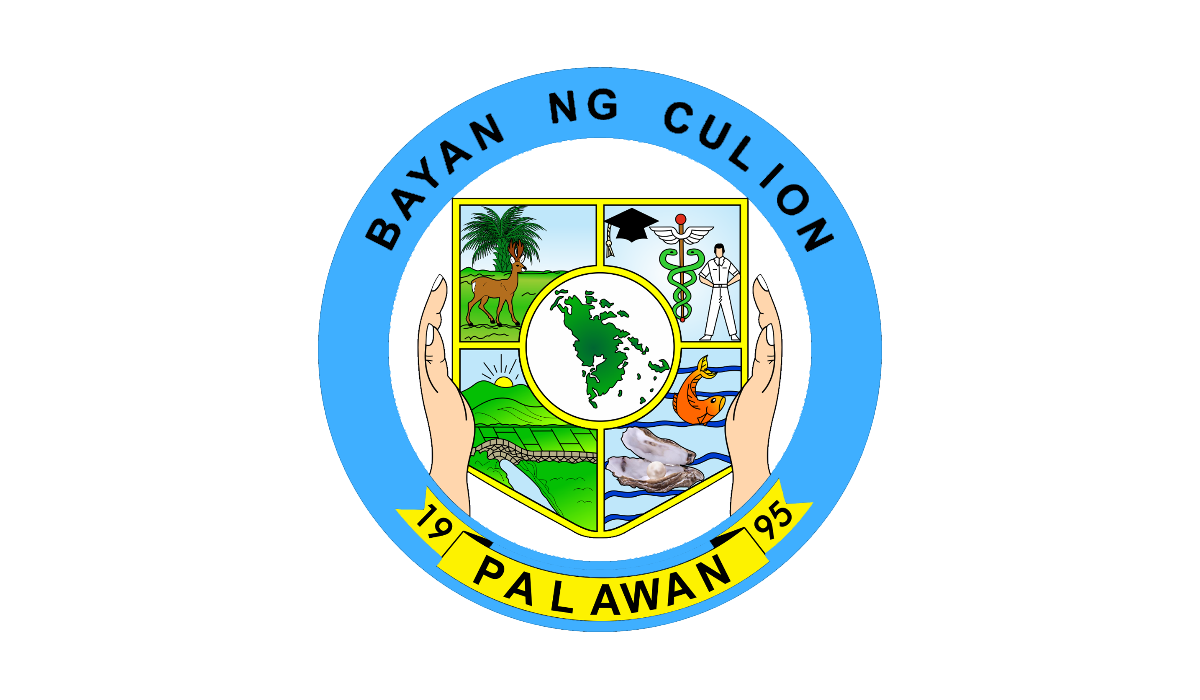
- Flag Seal

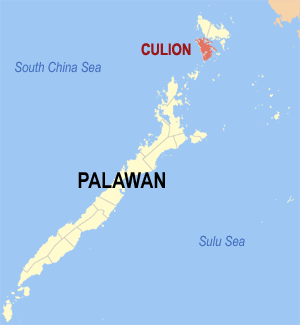
- Map of Palawan with Culion highlighted
- Interactive map of Culion
- Location within the Philippines
- Coordinates: 11°53′24″N 120°01′19″E
- Country: Philippines
- Region: Mimaropa
- Province: Palawan
- District: 1st district
- Founded: February 19, 1992
- Barangays: 14 (see Barangays)

Government
  - Type: Sangguniang Bayan
  - Mayor: Cesar M. De Vera Jr.
  - Vice Mayor: Ma. Virginia N. De Vera
  - Representative: Rosalie A. Salvame
  - Municipal Council: Members: Ronald H. Alcantara; Santino Josef G. Gomez; Ystan Joseph Aristotle G. Lagrosa; Fel Ford G. Solas; Leonilo R. Sarmiento; Rodel Nacachi; Eduardo Montenegro Jr.; Eduardo B. Layag
  - Electorate: 14,568 voters (2025)

Area
  - Total: 499.59 km^{2} (192.89 sq mi)
- Elevation: 45 m (148 ft)
- Highest elevation (Mount Oltaloro): 468 m (1,535 ft)
- Lowest elevation: 0 m (0 ft)

Population (2024 census)
  - Total: 23,985
  - Density: 48.009/km^{2} (124.34/sq mi)
  - Households: 5,651

Economy
  - Income class: 1st municipal income class
  - Poverty incidence: 24.76% (2023)
  - Revenue: ₱ 265.4 million (2022)
  - Assets: ₱ 310.2 million (2022)
  - Expenditure: ₱ 219 million (2022)
  - Liabilities: ₱ 42.72 million (2022)

Service provider
  - Electricity: Busuanga Island Electric Cooperative (BISELCO)
- Time zone: UTC+8 (PST)
- ZIP code: 5315
- PSGC: 1705322000
- IDD : area code: +63 (0)48
- Native languages: Calamian Tagbanwa; Palawano; Tagalog

Culion, officially the Municipality of Culion (Tagalog: Bayan ng Culion), is a municipality in the province of Palawan, Philippines. According to the 2024 census, it has a population of 23,985 people.

Culion consists primarily of Culion Island as well as 41 minor surrounding islands, as part of the Calamian group of islands.

It was a former leprosarium, starting in 1906 under the American colonial regime until the American commonwealth of the Philippines era. Although leprosy on the island-town was abolished in the 1980s, it was only in 2006 when it was declared a leprosy-free area by the World Health Organization. The municipality was created by virtue of Republic Act No. 7193 on February 19, 1992. In May 2017, the Philippine National Commission for UNESCO began its initiative to prepare the dossier of Culion's leprosy documentary heritage, which will be nominated in the future in the UNESCO Memory of the World Programme. In May 2018, the Culion Museum and Archives was officially nominated by the Philippines in the UNESCO Memory of the World Register – Asia and the Pacific. On June 18, 2018, Culion Leprosy Archives was officially inscribed in the Memory of the World Register – Asia and the Pacific. The government and the Asia-Pacific bloc aims to nominate the archives further to the International Memory of the World Register. If approved by UNESCO, it will be the fifth internationally recognized documentary heritage of the Philippines, increasing Culion town's feasibility to become a World Heritage Site in the future.

== History ==
=== Spanish colonial period ===
Aside from churches, the Spaniards built defensive fortifications in strategic places like Taytay, Cuyo, Agutaya, Linapacan, including a watchtower and fort in the locality of Libis.

In 1858, Spanish Palawan and the Calamianes were partitioned into two provinces, Castilla and Asturias. Castilla, which included northern Palawan, retained its capital in Taytay. Asturias extended south to Balabac. In 1873, the capital of Palawan was changed from Taytay to Cuyo. The French anthropologist Antoine-Alfred Marche traveled the Philippines and documented his research of many places. French Ambassador Pierre Revol in particular translated Marche's account of the Calamianes and Culion.

Marche described Culion as the principal village of the Calamianes. His account that a boat from Manila called at Culion once a month reflects the area’s growing economic activity during that period. His observations of the place and its inhabitants in the 1880s have since served as valuable references for the ethnographic study of the Calamianes for over a century.

Claudio Sandoval y Rodríguez, a Justice of the Peace, resided and held office in Culion, supporting the primacy of Culion as a leading settlement of the Calamianes. Sandoval, a Spanish mestizo from Jaro, Iloilo, married Evarista Manlavi, the daughter of a rich landowner from Cuyo. Sandoval became the Juzgado de Paz de Culión, Calamianes and held office sometime in the late 1880s. The seal of Claudio's office was found stamped on a handwritten circular dated December 11, 1889 that he sent to all residents within Culion's "roriedad y sus visitas," warning them of the penalties to be imposed on them if caught gambling. Culion's "visitas" included the island of Busuanga and other areas in Calamianes.

A remnant of the fort in San Pedro located somewhere in Burabud testifies to the rich history of Culion. In the early 1990s, it was widely believed that the roots of balete trees had already invaded this fort. The fort was built by Spanish Augustinian Recollects and is older than the one in Culion proper, the Immaculate Conception Church built by the Jesuits. This fort in San Pedro was more or less built in the same time span as the forts in Agutaya, Taytay and Cuyo which all still stand today and are preserved by the government of Palawan.

=== American commonwealth and Culion as a leprosarium ===
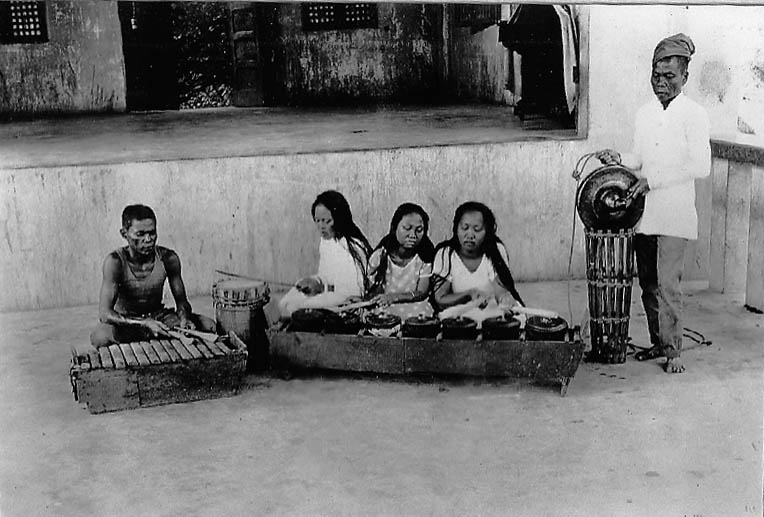
Members of the Culion leper colony in an undated photograph. The women in the center appear to be playing the kulintang traditional instrument.

When the Treaty of Paris was signed on December 10, 1898, wherein Spain sold the Philippines to the United States for 20 million dollars, the funding of Culion as a reservation was closely related to the Americans' early efforts to establish a form of public health policy in the Philippines as part of their long-term intentions to occupy the archipelago.

One of the motivating factors for the creation of the Manila Board of Health was traditional belief that the maintenance of public health required the isolation of cases of leprosy from the rest of the public. After an investigation of a number of sites, the island of Culion was selected as a segregation colony in 1901. On October 27, 1902, the Second Philippine Commission appropriated an initial amount of $50,000 for the establishment of Culion under the Secretary of Interior Dean C. Worcester and Director of Health Victor G. Heiser. On August 22, 1904, Luke E. Wright, the American Civil Governor of the Government of the Philippine Islands, signed Executive Order No. 35 which transferred the jurisdiction and control of Culion from the Municipality of Coron, reserving the same as a leper colony and a government stock farm.

=== Timeline ===
- On May 27, 1906, the first contingent of 370 patients from Cebu was brought to Culion by two Coast Guard cutters, the Polillo and the Mindanao.
- On September 12, 1907, Act 1711 of the Philippine Commission was passed, giving full responsibility to the Director of Health for the compulsory segregation of the lepers, and confinement and treatment in Culion.
- Between 1906 and 1910 the Americans rounded up 5,303 leprosy afflicted individuals and brought them to the colony. On July 18, 1912, acting Governor General Newton Gilbert signed EO No. 35, further defining the territory of the leper colony and government stock farm.
- In 1913, a special coinage issue was minted in aluminum by a private firm for the inmates of the Colony. Further special coinage issues would be minted for them at the Manila Mint from 1920 to 1930. A special paper money issue was generated during World War II for their use as well.
- In 1917, Section 1066 of Act No. 2711 (Revised Administrative Act) provided that the Department Head through the Director of Health shall have jurisdiction over the colony and its waters for the efficient management of the sanitarium.
- On June 18, 1952, Congress passed R.A. No. 753 which transferred administrative control to the Director of Hospitals. In 1964, the Secretary of Health again took administrative control and enforcement of rules and regulations over all the lands and waters of Culion Leper Colony as provided under Section 106 of the Revised Administrative Code. Sections 1060 to 1071 of RA no. 753 was later repealed by Republic Act No. 4073, an Act further liberalizing the Treatment of Leprosy by Amending and Repealing Certain Sections of the Revised Administrative Code, resulting in the loss of jurisdiction by the Department of Health over the natural resources of Culion.
- In 1979, a Culion Committee was created under Letter of Instructions No. 796. The Ministry of Human Settlements conceived and organized in 1982 an alternative development approach for residents of Culion under the Culion Development Project (CDP). This was later amended by Executive Order No. 241 on July 24, 1987, that transferred the said committee and the CDP to the Palawan Integrated Area Development Project (PIADP) of the National Council on Integrated Area Development (NACIAD). This transfer did not however affect the jurisdiction of DOH over the Culion Leper Colony.
- On June 22, 1988, Congress passed R.A. No. 6659 that authorized qualified residents of Culion Leper Colony to vote for the elective provincial officials of the Province of Palawan. In 1991, Speaker Ramon Mitra and House Representative David Ponce De Leon introduced a house bill for the creation of the Municipality of Culion. On February 12, 1992, President Corazon C. Aquino signed Republic Act 7193 creating the Municipality of Culion in the Province of Palawan.
- May 8, 1995 was when the first election of municipal and barangay officials of Culion was held resulting in the election of Hilarion Guia and Emiliano Marasigan Jr. as its first duly elected Mayor and Vice Mayor, respectively.
- On October 29, 1998, through Department of Health Administrative Order No. 20-A Series of 1998, administrative control and authority over the Municipality of Culion was officially transferred from the Department of Health to the Municipality ending nearly one century of administrative control by the health department over Culion Island.

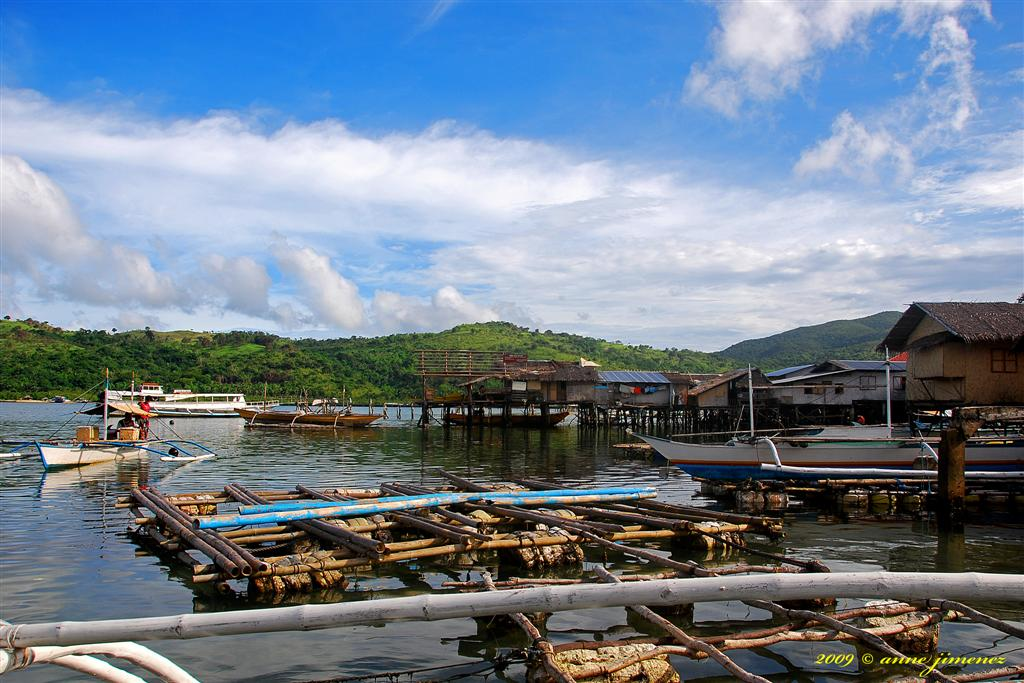
Fishing boats in Culion

- On March 12, 2001, Republic Act 9032 signed by President Gloria Macapacal Arroyo expanded the area of jurisdiction of the Municipality of Culion, Province of Palawan, amending for the purpose Republic Act 7193. The barangays of Balala, Baldat, Binudac, Culango, Galoc, Jardin, Libis, Luac, Malaking Patag, Osmeña and Tiza were declared legally existent upon the creation of the Municipality of Busuanga to the Municipality of Culion. Barangays Burabod and Halsey were transferred from the Municipality of Busuanga to the Municipality of Culion subject to ratification by plebiscite in the two municipalities of Culion and Busuanga. Barangay Carabao for the Tagbanua indigenous cultural community was likewise created subject to ratification by plebiscite in Culion.
- On July 15, 2002, plebiscites held in Culion and Busuanga simultaneously with the election of barangay officials and Sangguniang Kabataan representatives resulted in the ratification of the transfer of Halsey and Burabod to Culion and the creation of Barangay Carabao.
- In May 2018, the Philippines nominated the Culion Museum and Archives to the Memory of the World Register – Asia and the Pacific. The archive's declaration of passage or failure will be announced soon.
- On June 18, 2018, the Culion Leprosy Archives was officially inscribed to the Memory of the World Register – Asia and the Pacific.

== Geography ==
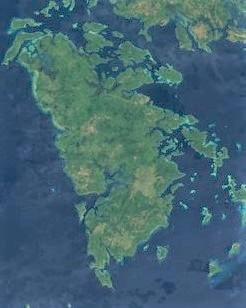
Culion island satellite image captured by Sentinel-2 in 2016

Culion is an island situated at the northernmost part of Palawan. It is part of the Calamian Archipelago in northern Palawan that also includes the municipalities of Busuanga, Coron, and Linapacan. During the Spanish Period, these were known as Las Islas de Calamianes, Provincia de España.

The municipality has a land area of 500 square kilometres (190 sq mi) which includes the 41 surrounding islands and measures a total of 1,191.39 square kilometres (460.00 sq mi) including its territorial water. Its largest island, Culion Island, has an area of 389 square kilometres (150 sq mi). It is bounded on the north by Busuanga Island, on the east by the Coron Reef, on the south by Linapacan Island, and on the west by the South China Sea.

The Culion sea has a total of 201 fish species including commercial fish like Lapu-lapu (Groupers), Kanuping (Sweetlip Emperor), Maya-Maya (Snapper), Tanguige (Spanish Mackerel), Dalagang Bukid (Blue and Gold Fusiliers) and Bisugo (Breams). Squid, cuttlefish, shrimps, crabs, shellfish and sea cucumber or trepang are also prevalent.

Three ecosystems sustain the rich marine life of Culion: mangroves, seagrass, and corals. 17 mangrove species cover the coastline of Culion. 9 seagrass species and 47 coral genera representing 60% of the total genera found in the Philippines are found in Culion.

=== Barangays ===
Culion is politically subdivided into 14 barangays. Each barangay consists of puroks and some have sitios.

- Balala
- Baldat
- Binudac
- Burabod
- Carabao
- Culango
- Galoc
- Halsey
- Jardin
- Libis
- Luac
- Malaking Patag
- Osmeña
- Tiza

=== Climate ===
Climate data for Culion, Palawan
Month	Jan	Feb	Mar	Apr	May	Jun	Jul	Aug	Sep	Oct	Nov	Dec	Year
Mean daily maximum °C (°F)	30 (86)	31 (88)	32 (90)	32 (90)	31 (88)	30 (86)	29 (84)	28 (82)	28 (82)	29 (84)	30 (86)	30 (86)	30 (86)
Mean daily minimum °C (°F)	21 (70)	21 (70)	22 (72)	23 (73)	25 (77)	25 (77)	25 (77)	25 (77)	25 (77)	24 (75)	23 (73)	21 (70)	23 (74)
Average precipitation mm (inches)	30 (1.2)	26 (1.0)	39 (1.5)	58 (2.3)	192 (7.6)	283 (11.1)	341 (13.4)	323 (12.7)	317 (12.5)	231 (9.1)	119 (4.7)	56 (2.2)	2,015 (79.3)
Average rainy days	10.3	8.5	12.4	16.3	23.5	27.1	28.4	27.3	27.6	26.3	19.2	13.6	240.5
Source: Meteoblue (modeled/calculated data, not measured locally)

== Demographics ==
Population census of Culion
Year	Pop.	±% p.a.
1995	13,024	—
2000	14,302	+2.03%
2007	17,194	+2.57%
2010	19,543	+4.77%
2015	20,139	+0.57%
2020	23,213	+3.04%
2024	23,985	+0.79%
Source: Philippine Statistics Authority

In the 2024 census, the population of Culion was 23,985 people, with a density of 48 inhabitants per square kilometre or 120 inhabitants per square mile.

The original people of Culion are the Tagbanuas, a cultural minority group that lives by fishing and food gathering. While preserving their native customs and traditions, the Tagbanuas are greatly influenced by Muslim culture and social organization.

Early trading activities attracted people from other parts of Palawan, like Calamianen and Cuyonon, who came and stayed in Culion as their new home.

Today, however, the Tagbanuas no longer practice many of their cultural traditions and many of them have been converted to Christianity. They are largely marginalized, making up only about 8% of Culion's total population. Barangay Carabao, under Republic Act 9032, was established for these indigenous people. They were also granted Certificates of Ancestral Domain under Republic Act 8371, also known as the Indigenous Peoples' Rights Act of 1997.

The establishment of the leper colony in 1906, Hansenites and hospital staff were brought to Culion from different parts of the Philippines bringing their customs, habits, dialects, and regional characteristics, and the influx of migrants in the last three decades have understandably made Culion an heterogeneous population.

== Tourism ==
Culion :The Paradise Regained is the new official tourism brand of the municipality through the SB Resolution No. 2025-2361.

== Economy ==
Poverty incidence of Culion (%)

Source: Philippine Statistics Authority

== Education ==
The Culion Schools District Office governs all educational institutions within the municipality. It oversees the management and operations of all private and public, from primary to secondary schools.

=== Secondary schools ===
- Canimango National High School
- Culion Sanitarium Special National High School
- Halsey National High School
- Lumber Camp National High School
- Loyola College (Junior and Senior High School) Webiste : www.loyolacollegeofculion.edu.ph

== In popular culture ==
The 2019 film Culion depicts the island's history during the 1940s when the disease was considered a life sentence.
