= Yoshii Isamu Memorial Museum =

- 吉井勇記念館
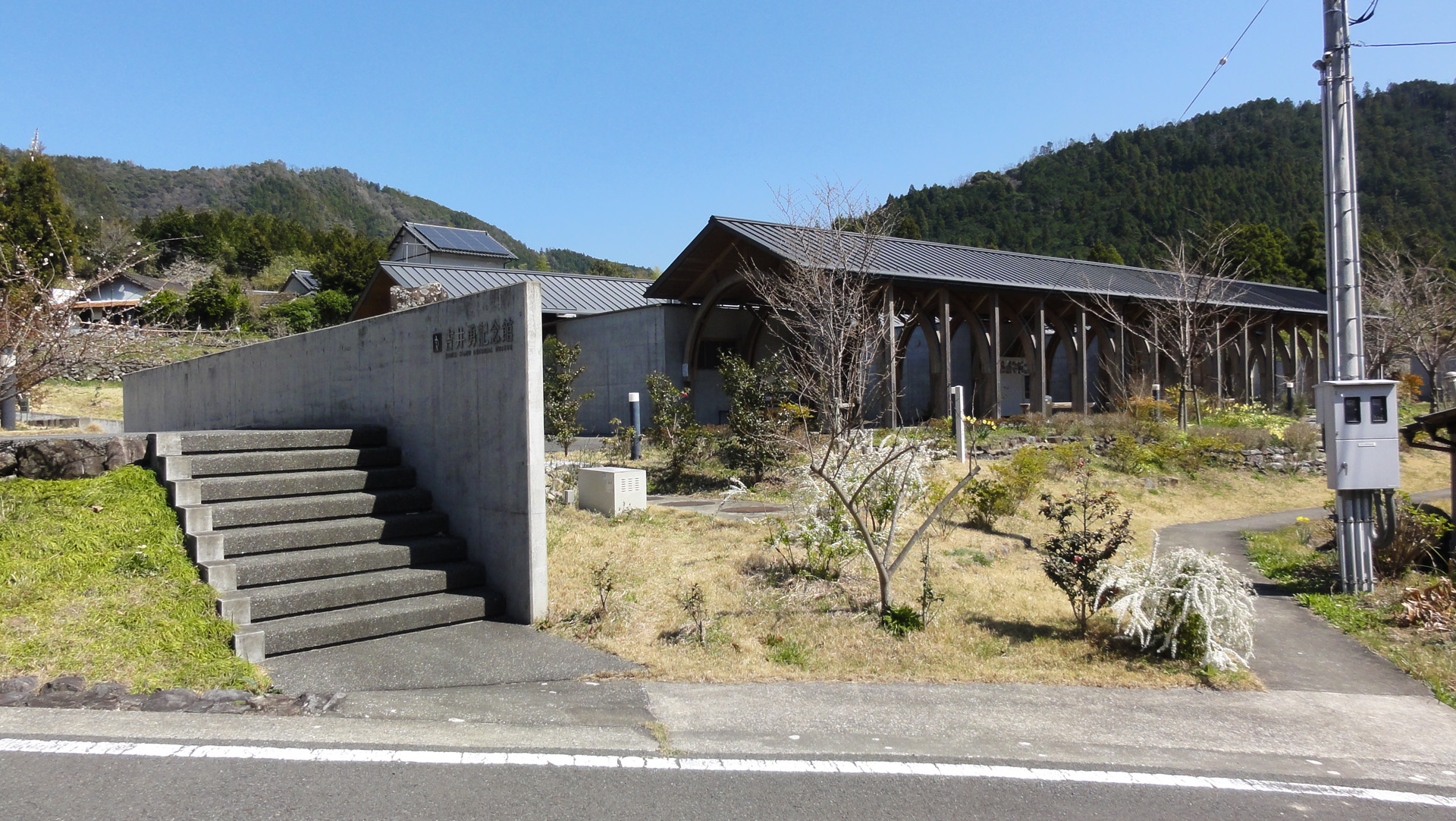
- Interactive map of the Yoshii Isamu Memorial Museum area

General information
- Location: 514 Inano Kahoku-chō, Kami, Kōchi Prefecture, Japan
- Coordinates: 33°42′22″N 133°51′23″E
- Opened: 31 May 2003

Website
- Official website

The Yoshii Isamu Memorial Museum (香美市立吉井勇記念館, Kami Shiritsu Yoshii Isamu Kinenkan) opened in then Kahoku, now Kami, Kōchi Prefecture, Japan in 2003. It is dedicated to the life and works of poet Yoshii Isamu. In the grounds lies the Keiki-sō, his retreat of 1934, restored in 1964 and relocated to this site in 2006, a registered Tangible Cultural Property.

== See also ==
- Yanase Takashi Memorial Hall
- Kōchi Literary Museum
- Minka
