= Anpanman Museum =

Anpanman Museum may refer to:

- Yanase Takashi Memorial Hall
- Yokohama Anpanman Children's Museum & Mall
- Nagoya Anpanman Children's Museum & Park
- Kobe Anpanman Children's Museum & Mall
- Sendai Anpanman Children's Museum & Mall
- Fukuoka Anpanman Children's Museum in Mall
