= Imada =

- Language(s): Japanese

Origin
- Meaning: Various

Imada (今田, 井麻田) is a Japanese surname. People with this surname include:

- Torajiro Imada (1859–1940), Japanese police chief and leprosy sanatorium director
- Ito Imada (1891–1987), Japanese immigrant farmer in British Columbia
- Katsuyori Imada (1878–1950), Japanese writer of the Meiji period
- Koji Imada (born 1966), Japanese comedian, tarento and TV presenter
- Fujio Imada
- Masaru Imada (1932–2025), Japanese jazz pianist
- Jeff Imada (born 1955), American martial artist, stuntman, director, and actor
- Ryuji Imada (born 1976), Japanese professional golfer based in the United States
- Toby Imada (born 1978), American mixed martial arts fighter

== See also ==
- 16079 Imada (1999 RP181), main-belt asteroid discovered in 1999
- Imada Puppet Troupe, traditional Japanese puppet troupe in the style known as Ningyō Jōruri
- imada (imadat) are divisions of delegations of Tunisia
- IMADA, Institute of Mathematics and Computer Science at University of Southern Denmark
- IMADA, Inc., a company providing force and torque measurement equipment based in Northbrook, Illinois.
