= Kahoku (disambiguation) =

Kahoku is the name of several places in Japan:

- Kahoku, Ishikawa, a small city in Ishikawa Prefecture
- Kahoku District, Ishikawa, a district in Ishikawa Prefecture
- Kahoku, Kōchi, a defunct town in Kochi Prefecture
- Kahoku, Kumamoto, a defunct town in Kumamoto Prefecture
- Kahoku, Yamagata, a town in Yamagata Prefecture
