= Kōnan, Kōchi =

Kōnan 香南市
- City
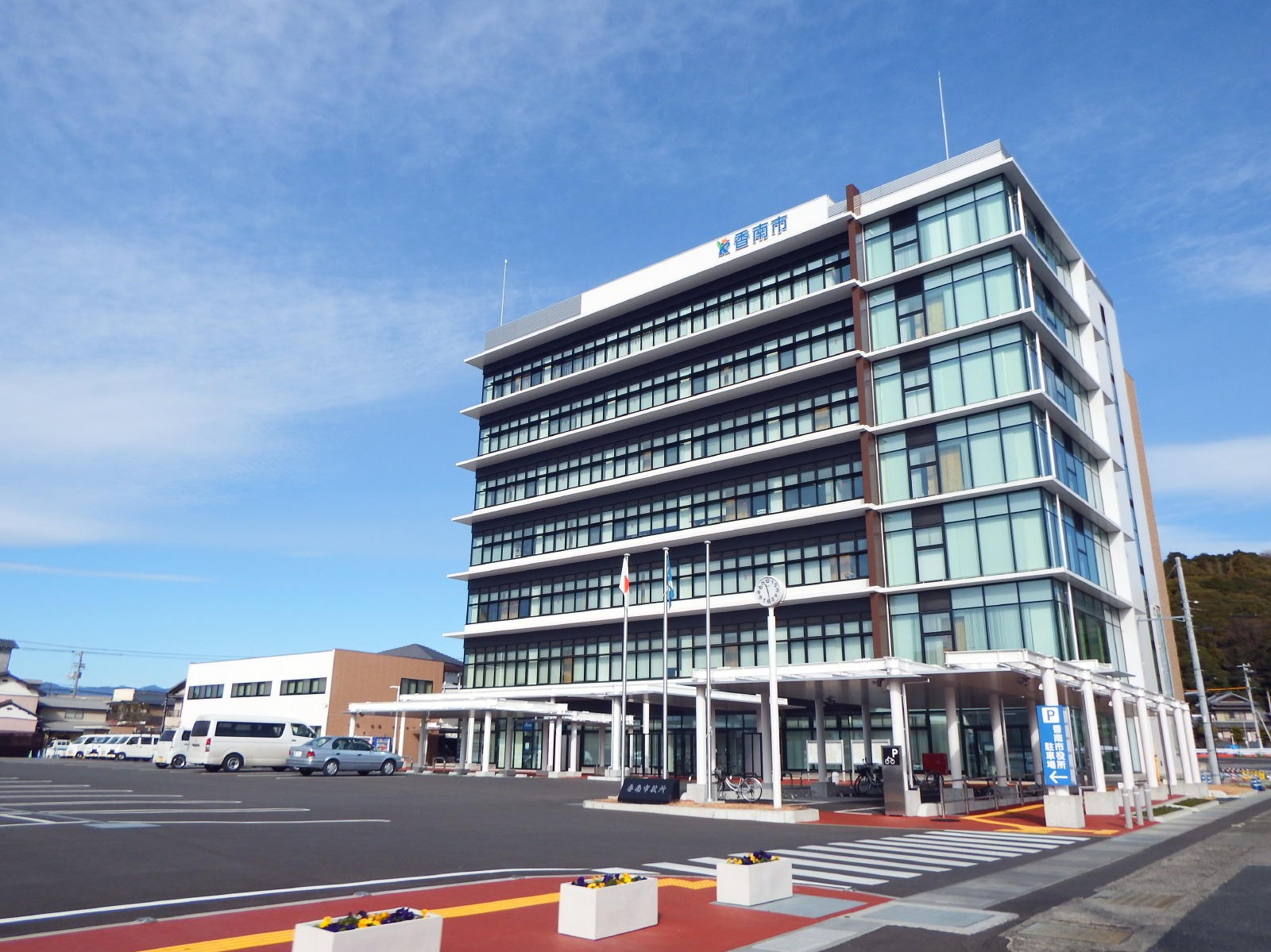
- Kōnan City Hall

- Flag Chapter
- Interactive map of Kōnan
- Location in Japan
- Coordinates: 33°34′N 133°42′E
- Country: Japan
- Region: Shikoku
- Prefecture: Kōchi

Area
  - Total: 126.46 km^{2} (48.83 sq mi)

Population (30 June 2022)
  - Total: 33,076
  - Density: 261.55/km^{2} (677.42/sq mi)
- Time zone: UTC+09:00 (JST)
- City hall address: 2706 Nishino, Noichichō, Kōnan-shi, Kōchi-ken 781-5232
- Website: www.city.kochi-konan.lg.jp

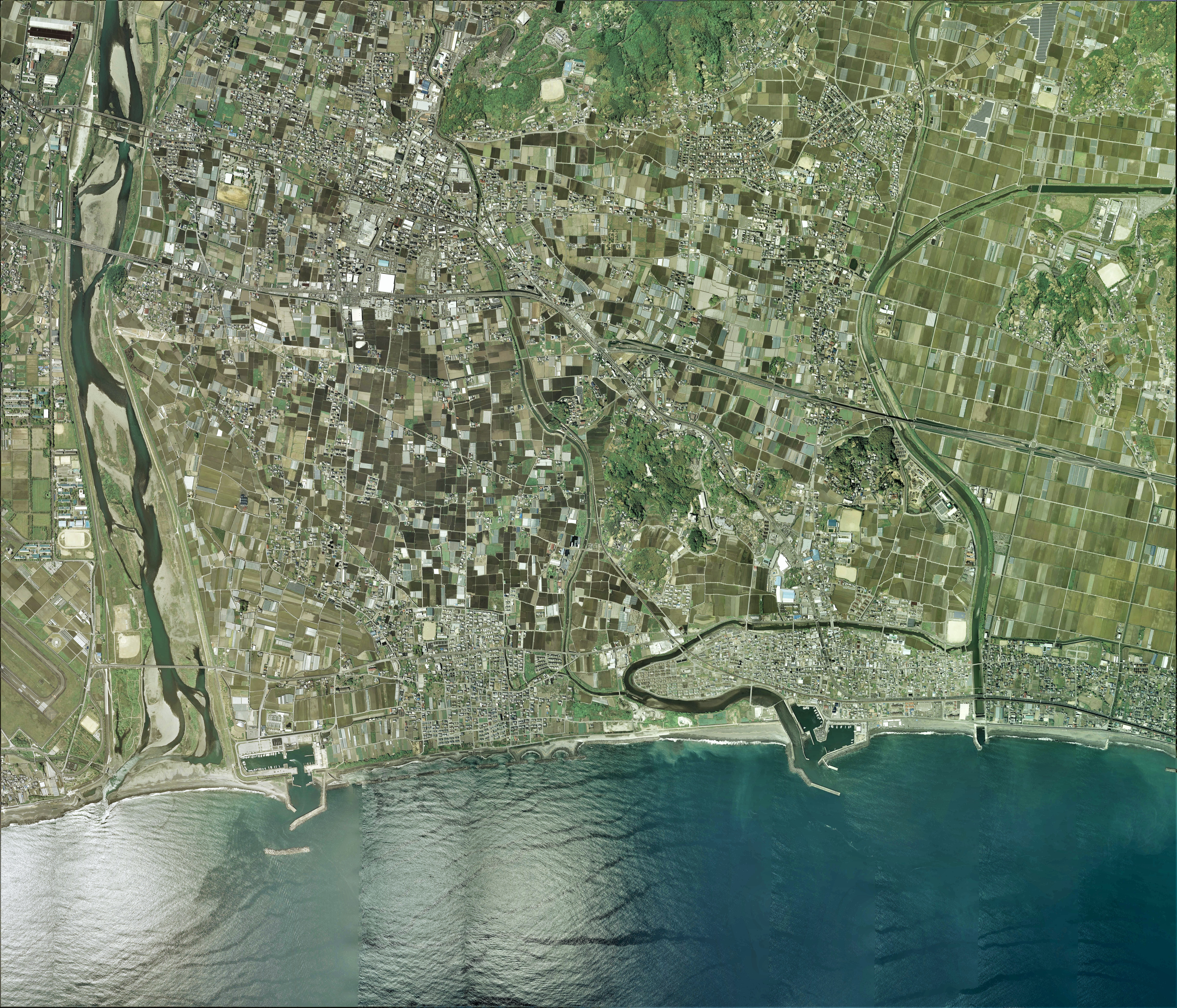
Aerial photograph of central Kōnan

Kōnan (香南市, Kōnan-shi) is a city located in Kōchi Prefecture, Japan. As of 30 June 2022, the city had an estimated population of 33,076 in 15350 households and a population density of 49 persons per km^{2}. The total area of the city is 126.46 square kilometres (48.83 sq mi).

== Geography ==
Kōnan is located in southeastern Kōchi Prefecture on the island of Shikoku. It faces Tosa Bay on the Pacific Ocean to the south.

=== Neighbouring municipalities ===
Kōchi Prefecture

- Aki
- Geisei
- Kami
- Nankoku

=== Climate ===
Kōnan has a humid subtropical climate (Köppen Cfa) characterized by warm summers and cool winters with light snowfall. The average annual temperature in Kōnan is 15.2 °C. The average annual rainfall is 2190 mm with September as the wettest month. The temperatures are highest on average in Kitagawa, at around 25.5 °C, and lowest in January, at around 4.9 °C.

== Demographics ==
Per Japanese census data, the population of Kōnan declined by roughly 25 percent from 1950 to 1970 but subsequently rebounded, peaking again around 2010.

Historical population
Year	Pop.	±%
1950	35,987	—
1960	30,429	−15.4%
1970	26,570	−12.7%
1980	28,493	+7.2%
1990	30,664	+7.6%
2000	32,639	+6.4%
2010	33,830	+3.6%
2020	32,207	−4.8%

== History ==
As with all of Kōchi Prefecture, the area of Kōnan was part of ancient Tosa Province. During the Edo period, the area was part of the holdings of Tosa Domain ruled by the Yamauchi clan from their seat at Kōchi Castle. The area was organized into villages within Kami District with the creation of the modern municipalities system on April 1, 1889. Akaoka was raised to town status on February 15, 1899, followed by Noichi on February 1, 1926, Yasu on January 1, 1943, and Kagami on April 1, 1955. The city of Kōnan was created by the merger of these four towns and the village of Yoshikawa on March 1, 2006. On the same day, the remaining municipalities of Kami District merged to form the city of Kami, and the district was abolished as a result.

== Government ==
Kōnan has a mayor-council form of government with a directly elected mayor and a unicameral city council of 22 members. Kōnan contributes two members to the Kōchi Prefectural Assembly. In terms of national politics, the village is part of Kōchi 1st district of the lower house of the Diet of Japan.

== Economy ==
Kōnan economy is centered on agriculture.

== Education ==
Kōnan has seven public elementary schools and four public middle schools operated by the city government, and one public high school operated by the Kōchi Prefectural Board of Education.

== Transportation ==
=== Railway ===
Tosa Kuroshio Railway - Asa Line

- Noichi - Yoshikawa - Akaoka - Kagami - Yasu

=== Highways ===
- Kōchi-Tōbu Expressway
- National Route 55

== Local attractions ==
=== Heritage sites ===
==== Notable temples ====
- Dainichi-ji (Temple No. 28 in the Shikoku 88 Temples Pilgrimage)
- Enichi-ji (houses three Buddhist statues that are important cultural properties)

==== Notable shrines ====
- Suruda Hachimangu Shrine

=== Tourist sites ===
==== Natural properties ====
- Tenshin Great Cedar (National Natural Monument])

==== Cultural buildings ====
- Ekingura Art Museum
- Noichi Zoological Park of Kochi Prefecture
- Shikoku Automobile Museum
- Ryoma History Museum

==== Other sites ====
- Teikokado Drawbridge
- YaSea Park

== Festivals and events ==
- Suruda Hachimangu Festival
- Ekin Festival - Held annually on the third weekend of July
- Dorome Festival - Held annually in April

== Notable people from Kōnan ==
- Yusuke Aoyagi - Manga artist
- Mikei Hagiwara - Personal physician to the Imperial Family
- Mika Iwakawa- Boxing champion
- Taro Kaiyama - Sumo wrestler
- Yu Kuroiwa - Horse racing jockey
- Shoma Morita- psychiatrist and founder of Morita therapy
- Masataka Murata- Physician who specialized in syphilis and leprosy
- Chohei Nomura - Shipwreck survivor on uninhabited Tori-shima (Izu Islands)
- Michinari Suenobe - Former Chairman of Tokio Marine and Fire Insurance
