= Tosayamada, Kōchi =

Dissolved municipality in Kōchi prefecture, Japan

Tosayamada (土佐山田町, Tosayamada-chō) was a town located in Kami District, Kōchi Prefecture, Japan.

As of 2003, the town had an estimated population of 22,160 and a density of 190.28 persons per km^{2}. The total area was 116.46 km^{2}.

On March 1, 2006, Tosayamada, along with the town of Kahoku, and the village of Monobe (all from Kami District), was merged to create the city of Kami and no longer exists as an independent municipality. However it is still considered a town by residents and is still used in official addresses with the post office.

Tosayamada has a sister city relationship with Largo, Florida. Yamada Senior High School and Largo High School (Florida) have an ongoing yearly exchange program.

Tosa-Yamada Station is the town's train station.

== Schools ==
- Kochi University of Technology
- Yamada Senior High School
- Kagamino Junior High School

== People from Tosayamada ==
- Taira Hara, manga artist
- Yumiko Kurahashi, writer and translator
