= Torajiro Imada =

Japanese police officer

Torajirō Imada
- Born: 1859; Okayama Prefecture, Japan
- Died: 1940 (aged 80–81)
- Occupations: Marshal of police, Director of a leper hospital
- Known for: Between 1909 and 1926, the first director of a public leper hospital, Sotojima Hoyoen, in Osaka, Japan, and successful management

Torajirō Imada(今田虎次郎, 1859–1940) was a Japanese police chief who became the first director of Sotojima Hoyoen, a leprosy sanatorium in Osaka, Japan from 1909 to 1926. He admitted the autonomy right of the patients' association. The Sotojima sanatorium was destroyed in Muroto Typhoon in 1934 and it was reconstructed as Oku-Komyo-En Sanatorium, Okayama Prefecture.

== Personal history ==
He was born in Okayama Prefecture in 1859. After becoming the chief of several police stations in Osaka, he became the marshal of Sonezaki Police Station, in Osaka. In 1909, he was appointed the director of the Sotojima Hoyōen Sanatorium, situated in Osaka Prefecture. He retired in April 1926 and lived in Sakai, Osaka Prefecture. After eight months, Masataka Murata became the second director of the sanatorium. He died around July 1940 in Sakai.

== Sotojima Hoyōen Sanatorium (1909-1934) ==
At the start of the sanatorium, it was a lawless area with wandering vagabonds. However, order and safety were gradually established by his efforts. The director of the sanatorium admitted that he used a free hand. With the exception of Kyushu Sanatorium, in Kumamoto, directors of leprosy sanatoria came from police, since wandering leprosy patients included criminals. However, physicians took the parts of directors later in other sanatoria. Imada exceptionally stayed as the director of the sanatorium for 17 years.

The first chief doctor of the hospital was Takekichi Sugai, who studied leprosy intensively, and wrote many papers and guided other doctors. There were about 300 leprosy patients which was the capacity of the sanatorium in one and a half years. The problems of food, drinking water, and clothing first appeared very difficult, and later stabilized. A patient recreation organization was formed at his proposal. Those who could work were paid, and farms and gardens were made. A church was established. He was an able administrator and was loved by patients. In 1919, when the patient organization wanted to withdraw their autonomy right, Imada strongly inspired the spirit of autonomy.
