= Kami District =

Kami District may refer to the following districts in Japan:

- Kami District, Miyagi
- Kami District, Kōchi
