= Sugai =

Sugai (written: 菅井 or 須貝) is a Japanese surname. Notable people with the surname include:

- Eri Sugai (菅井 えり, 1961–2016), Japanese singer, composer and arranger
- Hitoshi Sugai (須貝 等, born 1962), Japanese judoka
- Ichiro Sugai (菅井 一郎, 1907–1973), Japanese actor
- Kin Sugai (菅井 きん, 1926 - 2018), Japanese actress
- Kumi Sugai (菅井 汲, 1919–1996), Japanese painter and printmaker
- Madoka Sugai (菅井 円加, born 1994), Japanese ballet dancer
- Naoki Sugai (菅井 直樹, born 1984), Japanese footballer
- Noboru Sugai (須貝 昇, born 1949), Japanese golfer
- Takekichi Sugai (菅井 竹吉, 1871–1944), Japanese dermatologist
- Takuya Sugai (菅井 拓也, born 1991), Japanese footballer
- Tatsuya Sugai (菅井 竜也, born 1992), Japanese shogi player
- Yohei Sugai (菅井 洋平, born 1985), Japanese long jumper
- Yūka Sugai (菅井 友香, born 1995), Japanese idol singer
