= Oku-Komyo-En Sanatorium =

Coordinates: 34°40′15″N 134°13′28″E

National Sanatorium Oku Kōmyō-en

Geography
- Location: 6253 Mushiake, Oku-machi, Setouchi, Okayama, Japan

Organisation
- Care system: HealthCare of those who had leprosy
- Type: National hospital run by Ministry of Health, Labour and Welfare (Japan)

History
- Opened: 1909

Links
- Website: http://www.komyoen.go.jp/
- Lists: Hospitals in Japan

Oku-Kōmyō-En Sanatorium (光明園), or National Sanatorium Oku-Kōmyō-En is a sanatorium for leprosy and ex-leprosy patients on the island of Nagashima, Oku-machi, Setouchi, Okayama, Japan. The same island holds the National Sanatorium Nagashima Aiseien. As of December 2, 2005, the Oku-Kōmyō-En housed 252 residents (131 males and 121 females).

== History ==
Sotojima Hoyoen Sanatorium opened April 1, 1909 in Nakashima, Nishiyodogawa-ku, Osaka for patients in Kyoto fu, Hyogo prefecture, Nara Prefecture, Wakayama prefecture, Mie prefecture, Shiga prefecture, Gifu Prefecture, Fukui Prefecture, Ishikawa Prefecture, Toyama Prefecture, and Tottori Prefecture.

The sanatorium, built in the Kanzaki River delta valley, was hit by the Muroto typhoon on September 21, 1934. The storm left 2,702 dead and 334 missing, including 187 people in the sanatorium (173 patients, 3 employees, and 11 family members). On September 24, 1934, the Interior Ministry decided to transfer 416 survivors to other sanatoriums, including Nagashima Aiseien Sanatorium (78 patients), Kyushu Sanatorium (Kikuchi Keifuen Sanatorium) (50 patients), Ooshima Sanatorium (70 patients), Zensho Byoin (Tama Zenshoen Sanatorium) (70 patients), Hokubu Hoyoen Sanatorium (50 patients), and Kuryu Rakusen-en Sanatorium (98 patients).

=== Timeline ===
- April 1938: Prefectural Oku-Kōmyō-En Sanatorium was opened at Nagashima Island, neighboring Nagashima Aiseien Sanatorium
- July 1941: National Leprosarium Oku-Kōmyō-En
- 1946: National Sanatorium Oku-Kōmyō-En
- May 9, 1988: the Oku-Nagashima-Oohashi Bridge was completed from the mainland to the islands of Oku-Kōmyō-En and Nagashima Airakuen
- April 1996: The 1953 Leprosy Prevention Law was abolished
- July 1998: The trial for compensation started
- May 11, 2001: The trial for compensation ruled that the previous Leprosy Prevention was unconstitutional
- May 25, 2001: The trial for compensation was confirmed. The compensation of 8,000,000 yen to 14,000,000 yen was given to patients, depending on the duration of unconstitutional periods

=== Number of patients at end of fiscal year ===
The number of inpatients in a given year depends not only on those newly hospitalized and the recently deceased, but also on other factors such as patient escapes and discharges, depending on the conditions of the times. Recently, the sanatorium was encouraged to discharge patients, but a long-standing segregation and the resulting stigma against leprosy patients might have influenced the number of patients discharged.

Number of inpatients by year
Year	Number of patients
1945	871
1950	839
1955	962
1960	968
1965	931
1970	809
1975	728
1980	658
1985	585
1990	503
1995	422
1999	345

Number of inpatients by year
Year	Number of patients
2003	288
2004	267
2005	258
2006	244
2007	230
2008	215

== See also ==
- Leprosy in Japan
- Takekichi Sugai, the first physician at Sotojima Sanatorium
- Torajiro Imada, the first director of Sotojima Sanatorium
