= Akaoka, Kōchi =

Akaoka 赤岡町
- Town
- Flag Emblem
- Interactive map of Akaoka
- Country: Japan
- Prefecture: Kōchi
- District: Kami
- Dissolved: 1 March, 2006

Area
  - Total: 1.64 km^{2} (0.63 sq mi)

Population (2003)
  - Total: 3,382
  - Density: 2,060/km^{2} (5,340/sq mi)
- Website: city.kochi-konan.lg.jp

Akaoka (赤岡町, Akaoka-chō) was a town located in Kami District, Kōchi Prefecture, Japan.

As of 2003, the town had an estimated population of 3,382 and a density of 2,062.20 persons per km^{2}. The total area was 1.64 km^{2}, which was the smallest municipality in Japan before its dissolution.

On March 1, 2006, Akaoka, along with the towns of Kagami, Noichi and Yasu, and the village of Yoshikawa (all from Kami District), was merged to form the city of Kōnan; and no longer exists as an independent municipality. The smallest municipality in Japan is now Tadaoka in Osaka Prefecture.
