= Ryūga Cave =

Cave in Kōchi Prefecture, Japan

- 龍河洞
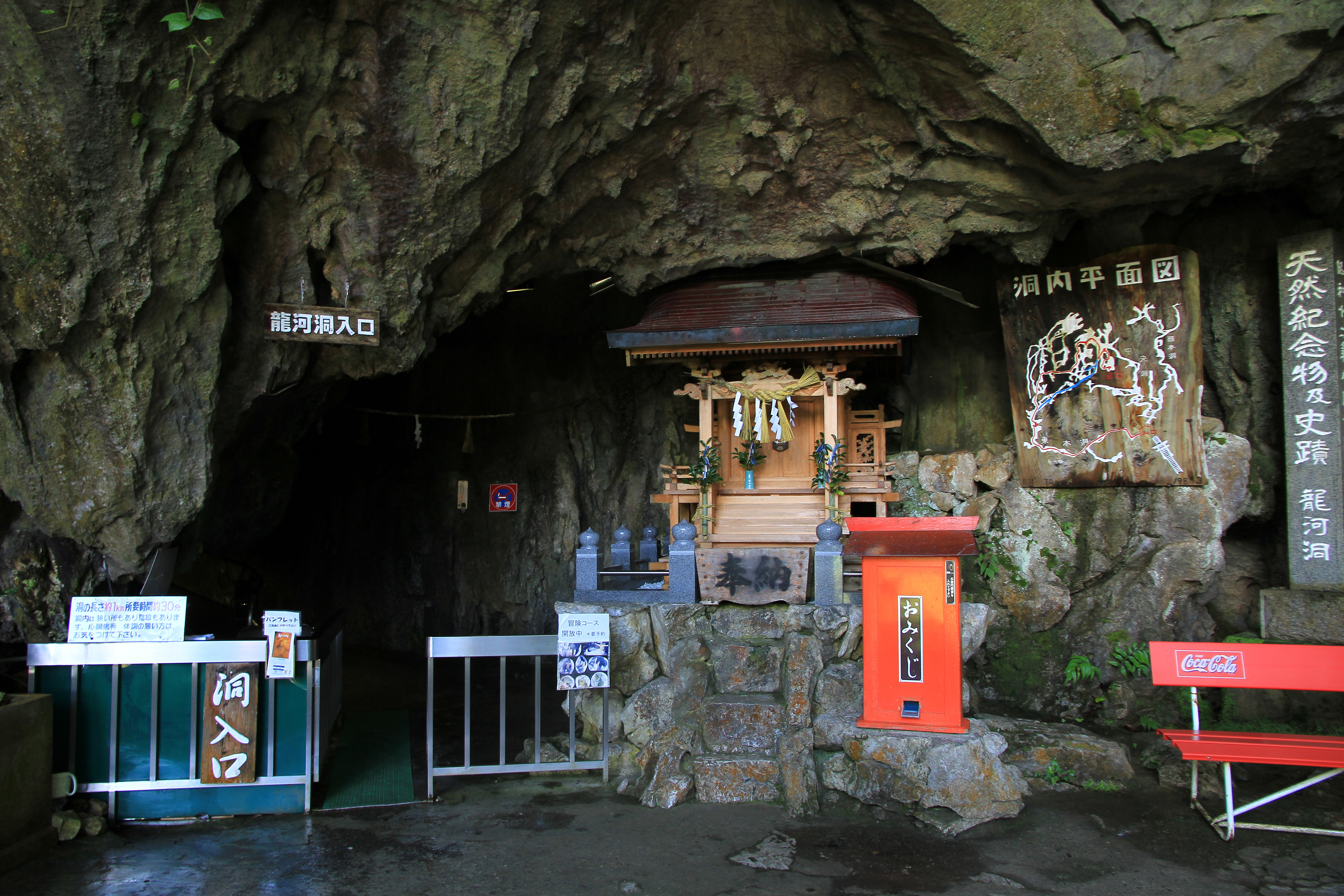

- Location within Kochi Prefecture
- Location: Kami City, Kōchi Prefecture
- Coordinates: 33.6032°N 133.7453°E
- Access: Public
- Show cave opened: 4 kilometers
- Show cave length: 1 kilometer
- Lighting: Yes
- Website: Official website
- National Historic Site of Japan Natural Monument

The Ryūga Cave (龍河洞, Ryūgadō), also known as Ryuga Cave or Ryugado Cave, is a limestone cave located in Kami City, Kōchi Prefecture, Japan. It is one of the three largest limestone caves in Japan, with a total length of 4 kilometers. The cave has been designated as a National Natural monument of Japan.

== Overview ==
The cave took roughly 175 million years to form.

Dozens of examples of Yayoi pottery, furnace remains, charcoal, and animal bones were discovered inside the cave, indicating that people were living in the cave during the Yayoi period approximately 2,000 years ago. For this reason, the cave was designated a National Historic Site in 1934.

The cave was opened to the public in August 1931; about a one kilometer portion is a show cave with illumination, stairways and marked paths.

== Gallery ==
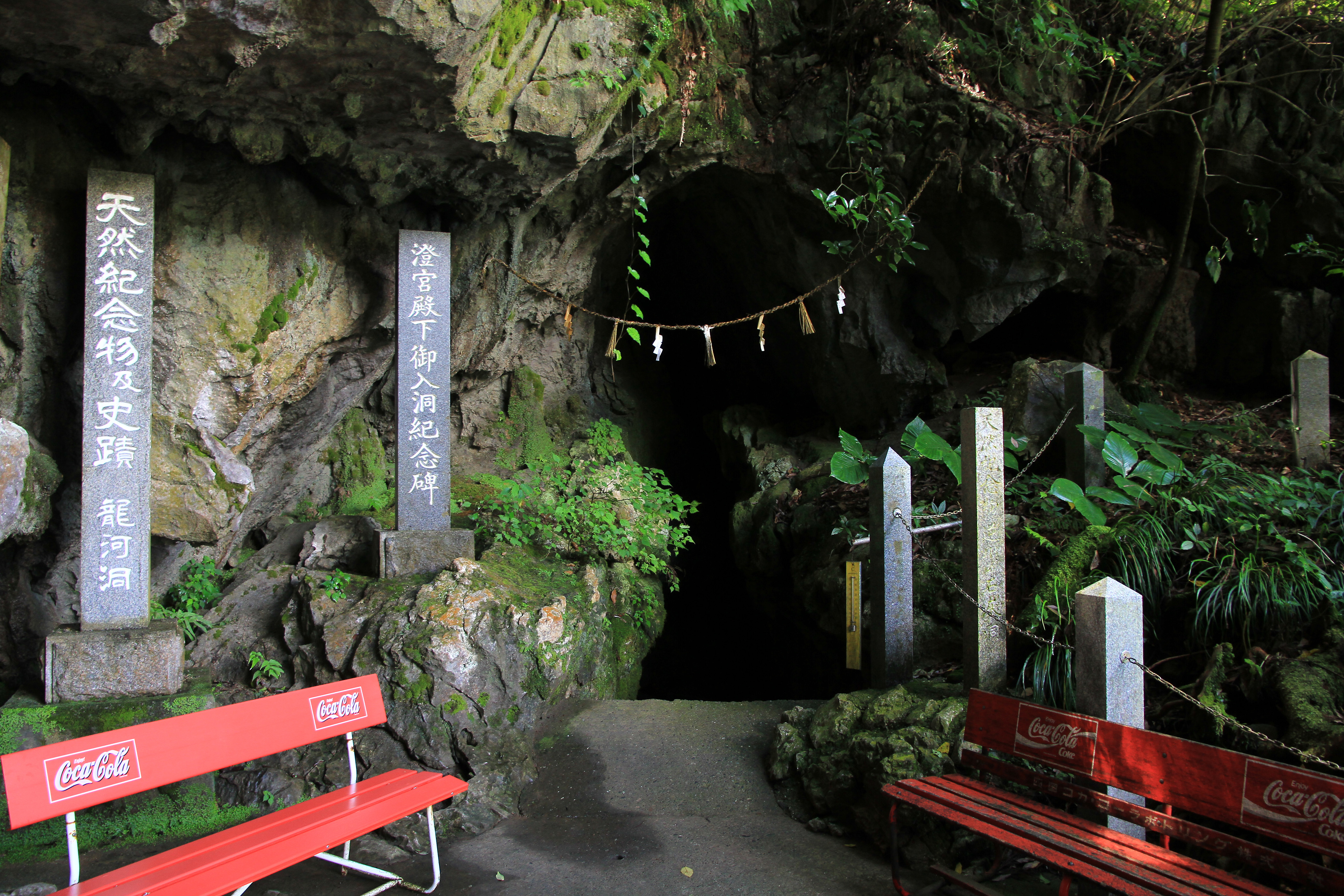
West Entrance

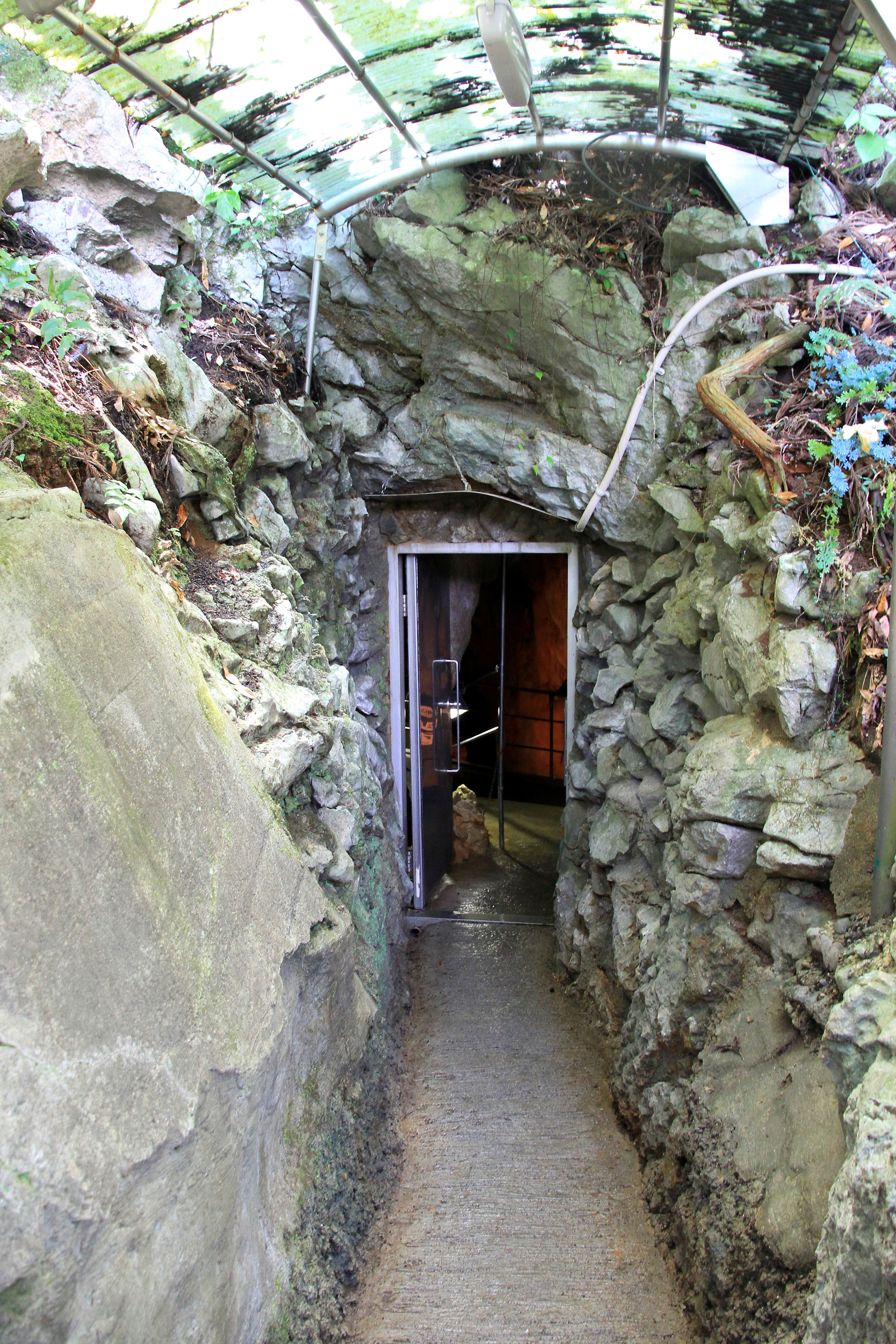
Exit

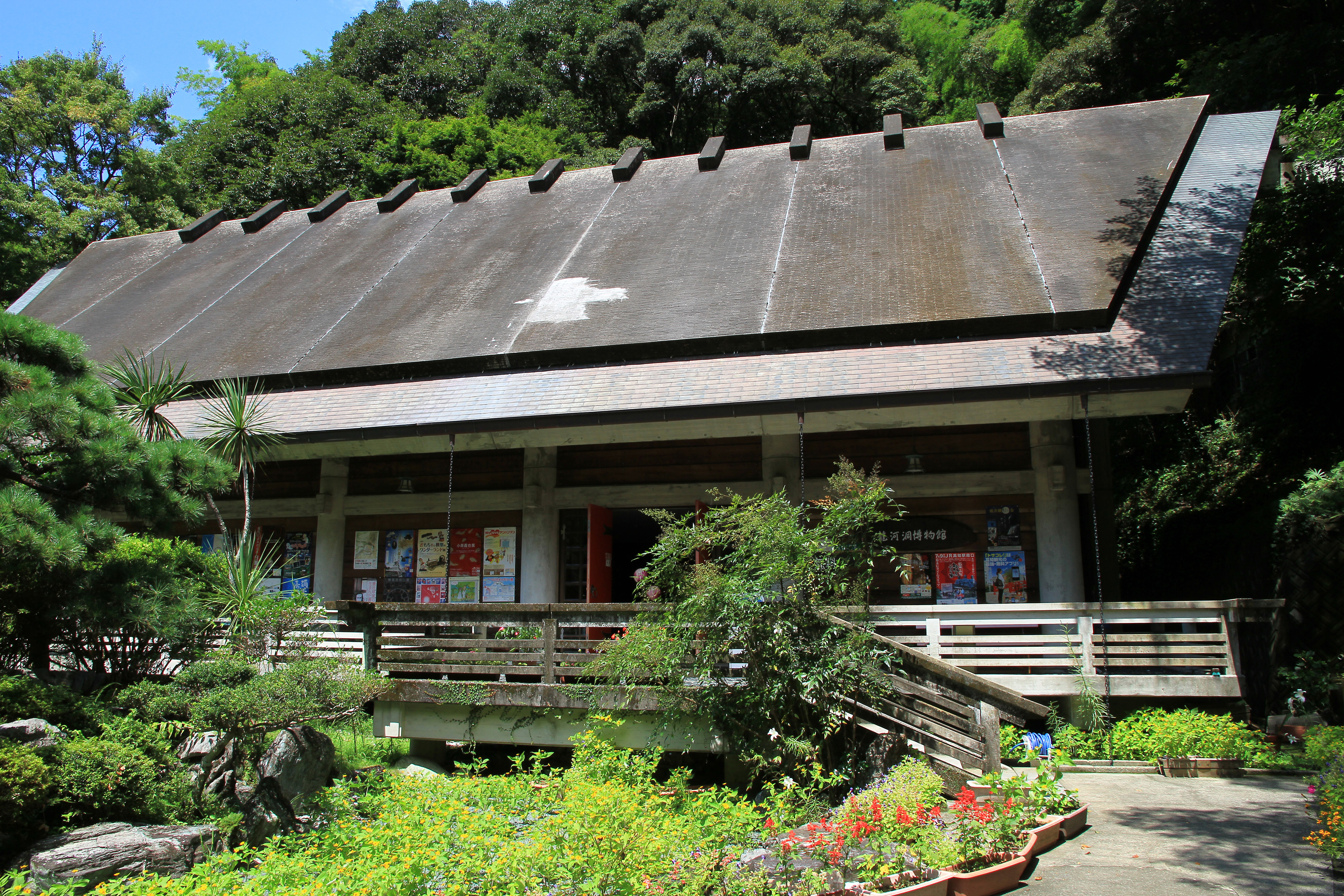
Museum

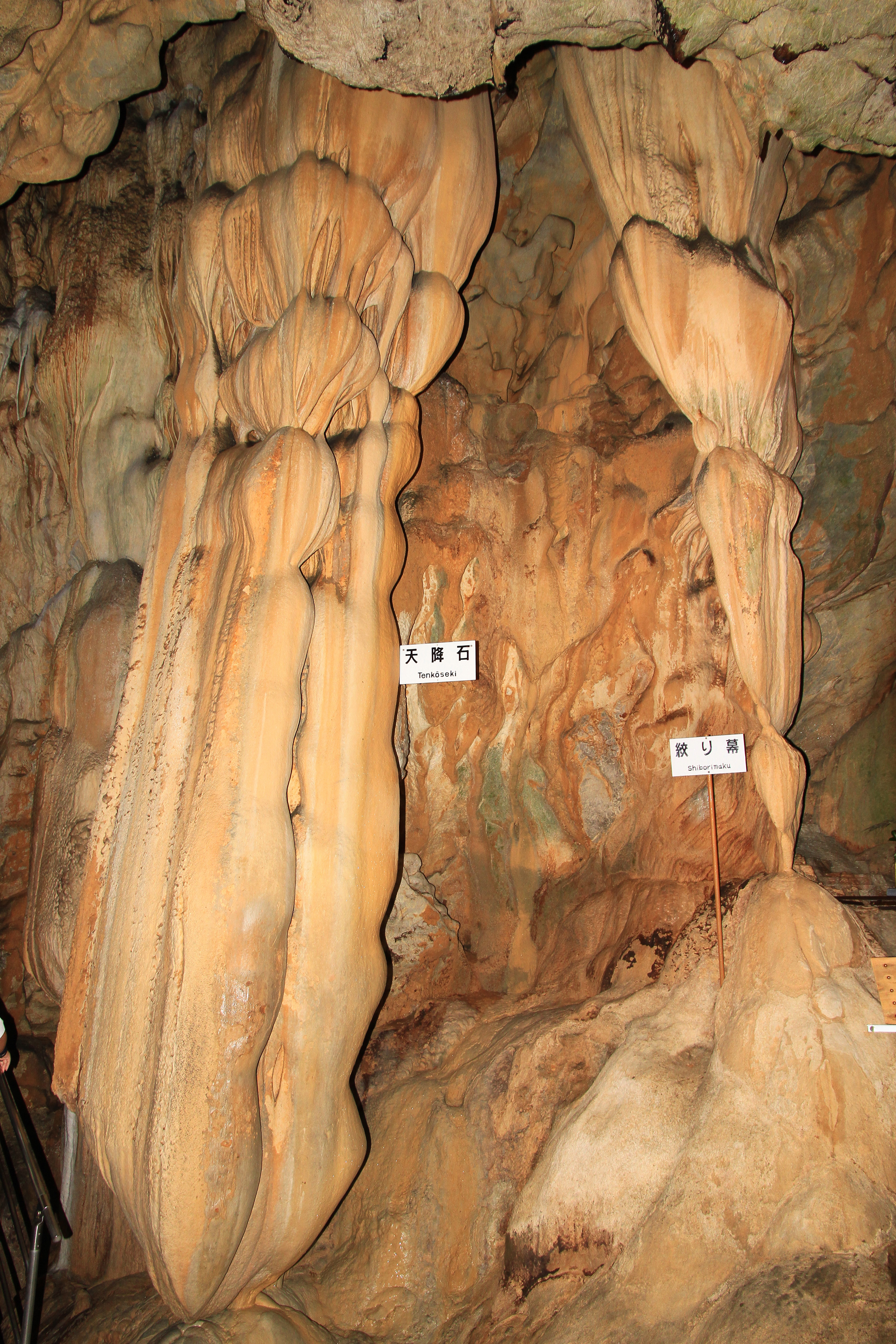
Cave formations

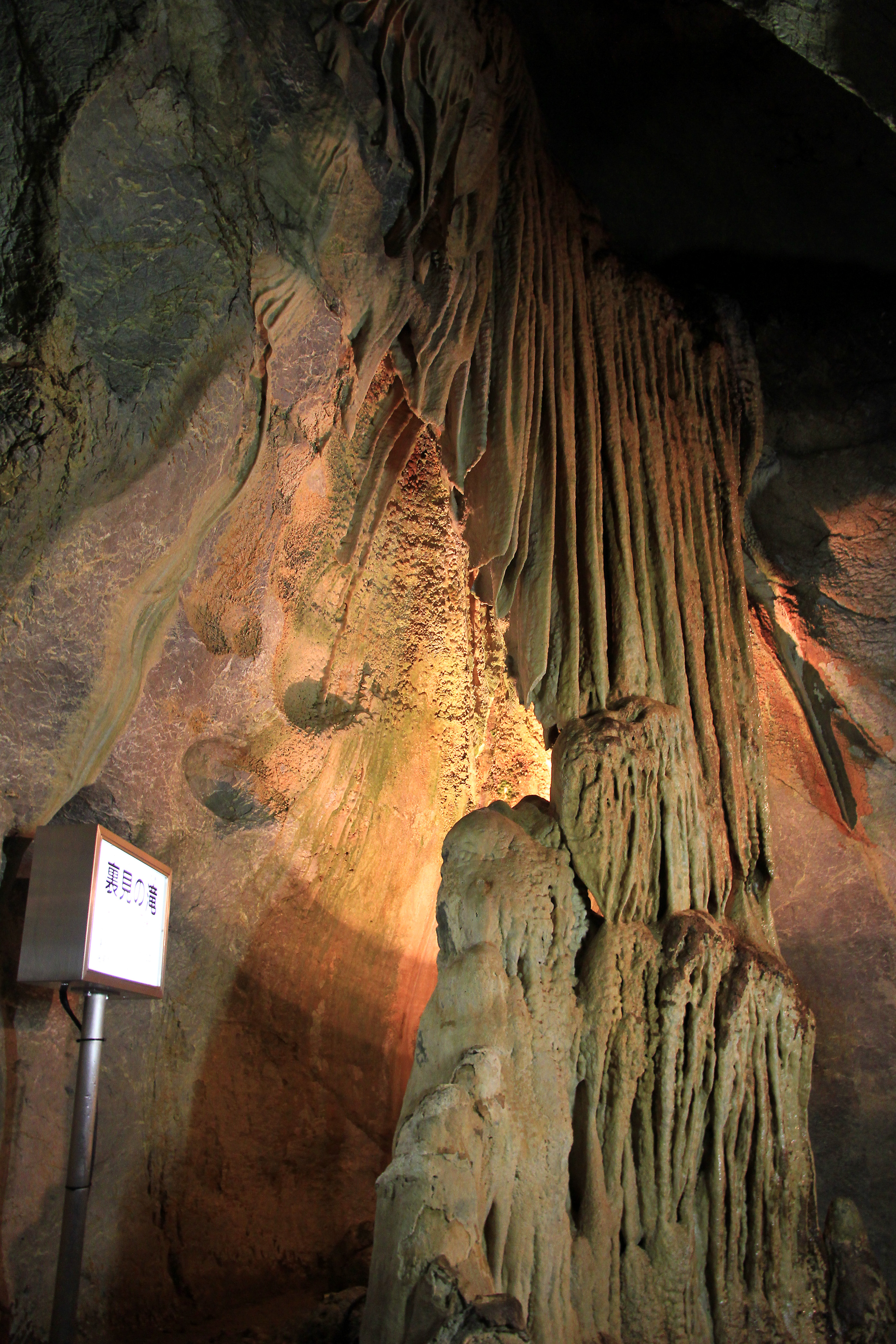
Cave formations

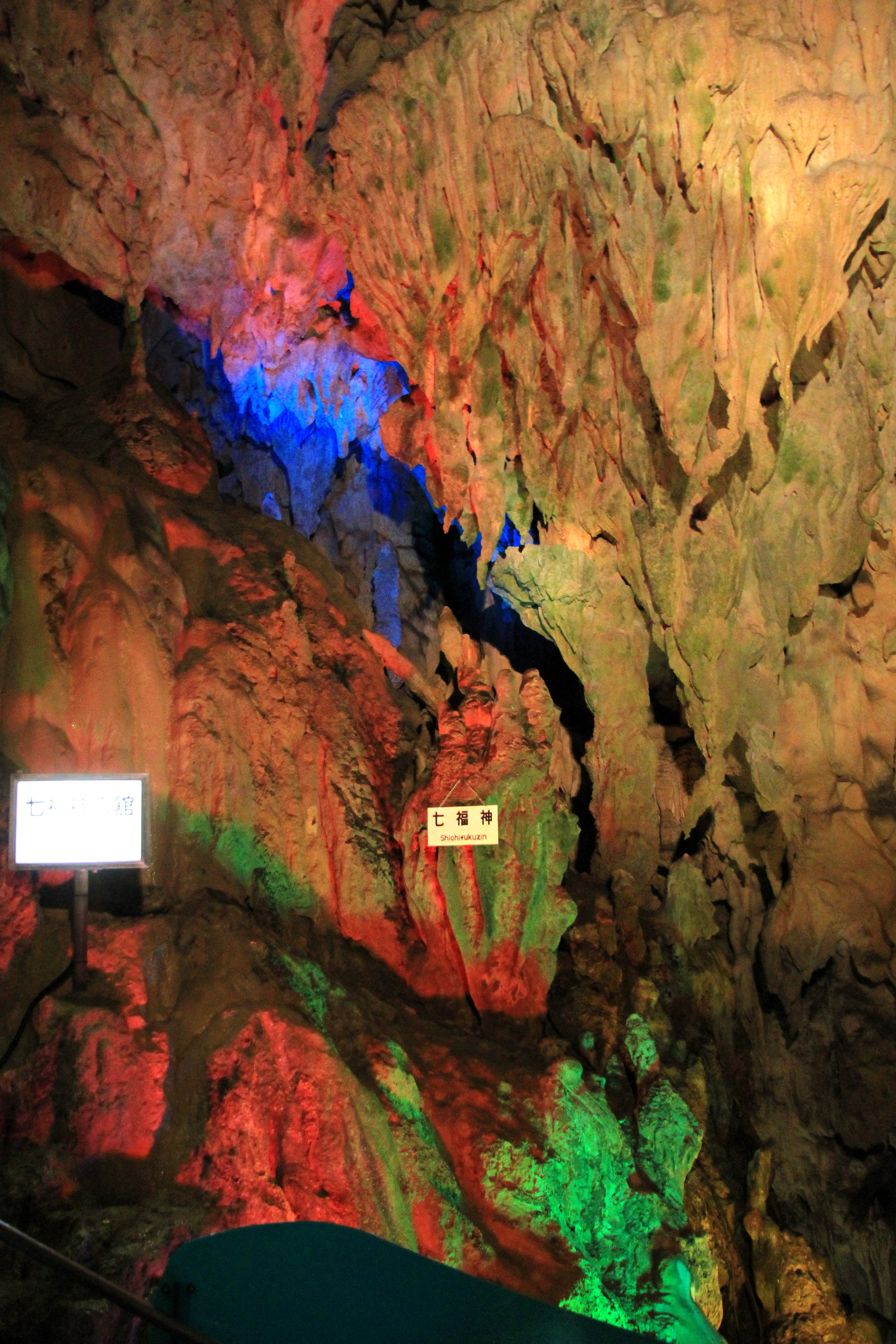
illumination

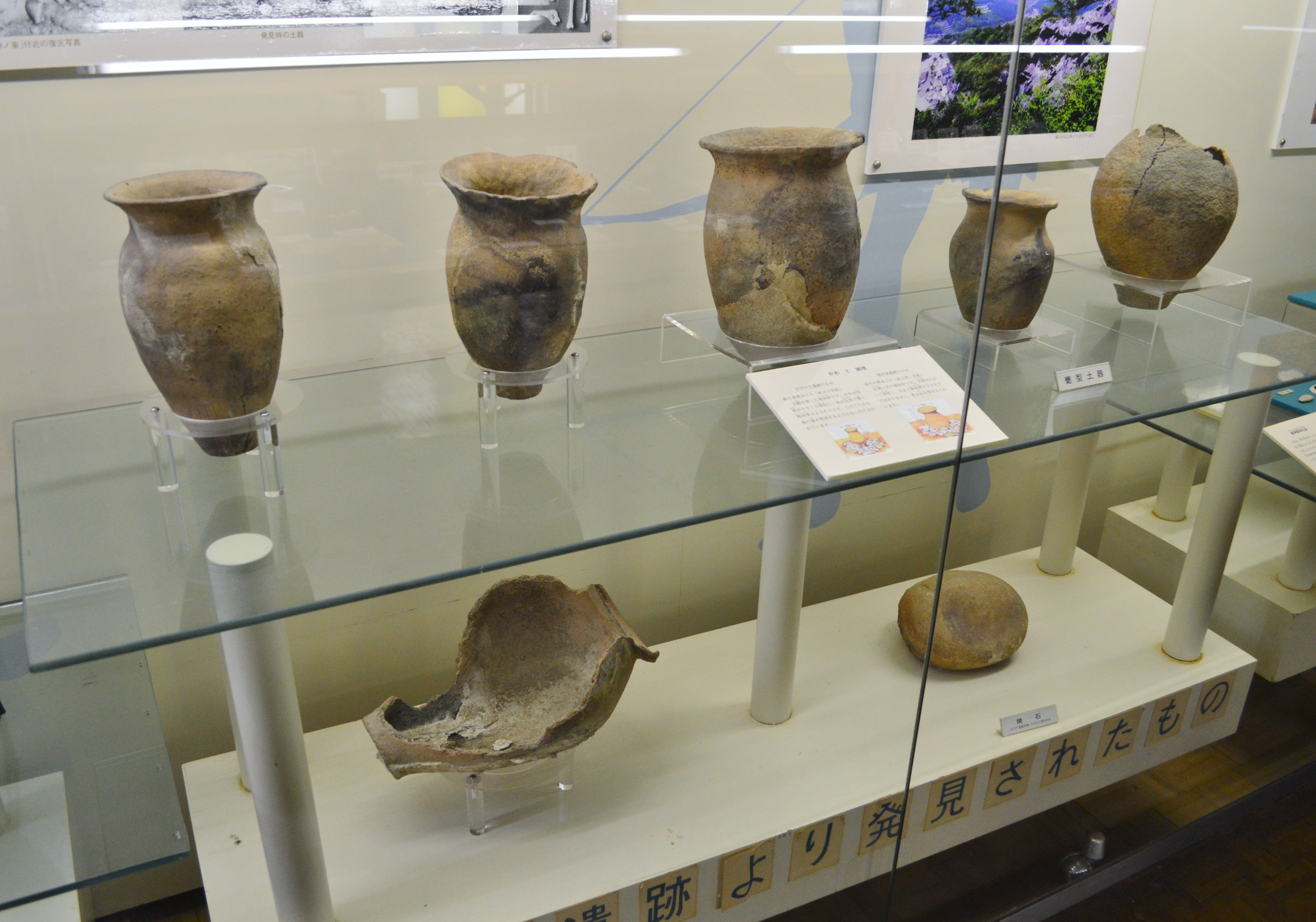
Yayoi pottery

== See also ==
- List of historic sites of Japan (Kōchi)
