= Taira Hara =

Japanese manga artist

Hara on a quiz show.

Taira Hara (はら たいら, Hara Taira; 8 March 1943 – 10 November 2006) was a Japanese manga artist and tarento born in Tosayamada (now part of Kami), Kōchi Prefecture, Japan. He was a long-time resident of Koishikawa, Bunkyō, Tokyo, Japan. He made his professional manga debut in 1963 with his story Shinjuku BB (新宿B·B, Shinjuku Bebe), published in Weekly Manga Times.

== History ==
Hara was the oldest son, though he had an older sister. His father died of tuberculosis before he was born.

Hara died of liver cancer on 10 November 2006 at a hospital in Fujimi, Saitama.
