= Monobe, Kōchi =

Monobe 物部村
- Former village
- Interactive map of Monobe
- Country: Japan
- Prefecture: Kōchi Prefecture
- District: Kami

Area
  - Total: 291.12 km^{2} (112.40 sq mi)

Population (2003)
  - Total: 2,924
  - Density: 10.04/km^{2} (26.0/sq mi)
- Time zone: UTC+09:00 (Japan Standard Time)

Monobe (物部村, Monobe-son) was a village located in Kami District, Kōchi Prefecture, Japan.

As of 2003, the village had an estimated population of 2,924 and a density of 10.04 persons per km^{2}. The total area was 291.12 km^{2}.

On March 1, 2006, Monobe, along with the towns of Kahoku and Tosayamada (all from Kami District), was merged to create the city of Kami and no longer exists as an independent municipality.
