= Dainichi-ji (Kōnan) =

Buddhist temple in Kōchi Prefecture, Japan

- 大日寺
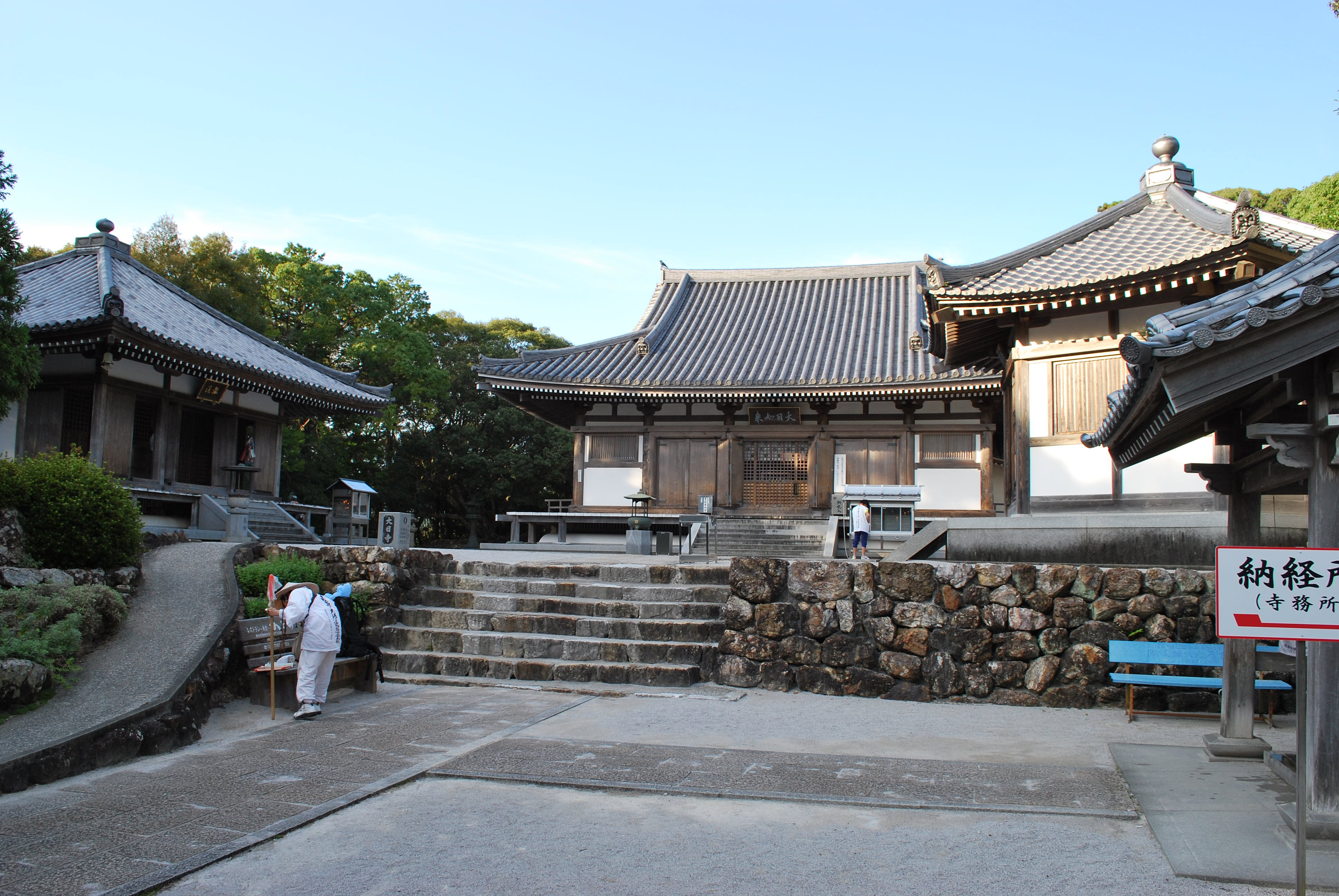

Religion
- Affiliation: Shingon

Location
- Location: Kōchi-ken
- Country: Japan
- Interactive map of Dainichi-ji
- Coordinates: 33°34′40″N 133°42′18″E

Website
- https://www.88shikokuhenro.jp/28dainichiji/

Dainichi-ji is a Shingon Buddhist Temple located in Kōnan, Kōchi, Japan. It is the 28th temple of the Shikoku Pilgrimage.
