= Kōchi Literary Museum =

- 高知県立文学館
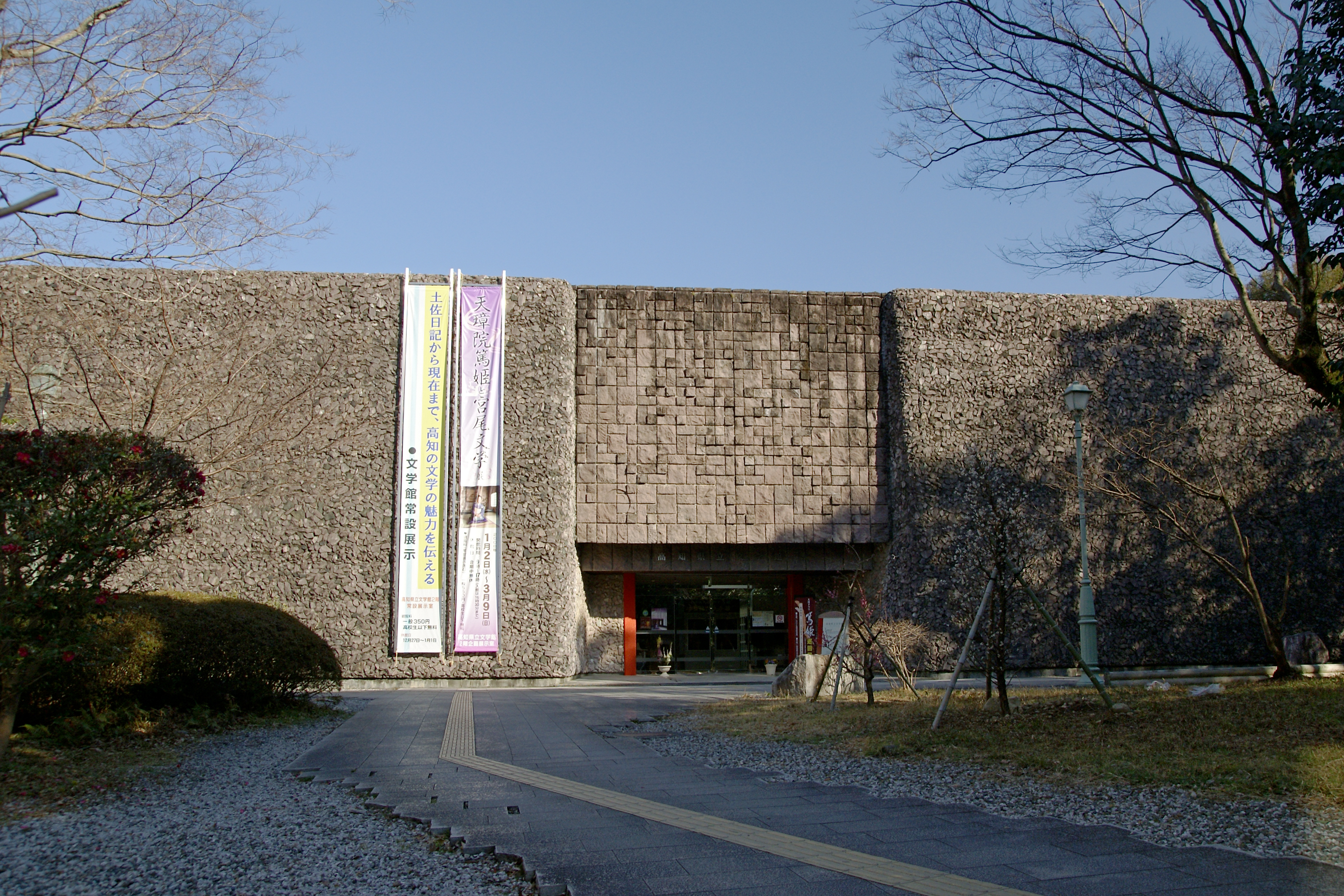
- Interactive map of the Kōchi Literary Museum area

General information
- Location: 1-1-20 Marunouchi, Kōchi, Kōchi Prefecture, Japan
- Coordinates: 33°33′43″N 133°32′00″E
- Opened: 1997

Website
- Official website

Kōchi Literary Museum (高知県立文学館, Kōchi Kenritsu Bungaku-kan) opened in the grounds of Kōchi Castle, Kōchi, Kōchi Prefecture, Japan in 1997. It is dedicated to the men of letters and literary life of the area from Tosa Nikki, through locally born Five Mountains master Gidō Shūshin, up until today.

== See also ==
- Kōchi Castle Museum of History
- Yoshii Isamu Memorial Museum
- The Museum of Art, Kōchi
