= Noichi, Kōchi =

Dissolved municipality in Kōchi prefecture, Japan

Noichi (野市町, Noichi-chō) was a town located in Kami District, Kōchi Prefecture, Japan.

As of 2003, the town had an estimated population of 17,465 and a density of 762.66 persons per km^{2}. The total area was 22.90 km^{2}.

On March 1, 2006, Noichi, along with the towns of Akaoka, Kagami and Yasu, and the village of Yoshikawa (all from Kami District), was merged to create the city of Kōnan and no longer exists as an independent municipality.
