= Kagami, Kōchi (Kami) =

Dissolved municipality in Kōchi prefecture, Japan

Kagami (香我美町, Kagami-chō) was a town located in Kami District, Kōchi Prefecture, Japan.

As of 2003, the town had an estimated population of 6,365 and a density of 108.08 persons per km^{2}. The total area was 58.89 km^{2}.

On March 1, 2006, Kagami, along with the towns of Akaoka, Noichi and Yasu, and the village of Yoshikawa (all from Kami District), was merged to create the city of Kōnan and no longer exists as an independent municipality.
