= Yasu, Kōchi =

Dissolved municipality in Kōchi prefecture, Japan

Yasu (夜須町, Yasu-chō) was a town located in Kami District, Kōchi Prefecture, Japan.

== History ==
On March 1, 2006, Yasu, along with the towns of Akaoka, Kagami and Noichi, and the village of Yoshikawa (all from Kami District), was merged to create the city of Kōnan and no longer exists as an independent municipality.

The port, Tei, is located in the south-east of the town and dates from the Edo period, over 200 years ago. The port walls of the time have remained intact.

The town merger, originally planned for 2005, was postponed because of the withdrawal of participating towns. Yasu did not withdraw but residents were not overly favorable to the merger. The merger into the new city of Konan took effect on March 1, 2006.

== Population ==
As of June 2004, the town had an estimated population of 4,440 and a density of 108.32 persons per km^{2}. The total area was 39.07 km^{2}.

== Economy ==
The main industries of Yasu are fisheries and farming. Local products include melons and various fruits.

== Education ==
As of July 2004, Yasu Junior High School has an enrollment of 97 students between the ages of 12 and 15. As Yasu has no high school, graduating students will continue to high schools in the Kami Area, Aki (to the east) and Kōnan (to the west).
