= Yoshikawa, Kōchi =

Dissolved municipality in Kōchi prefecture, Japan

Yoshikawa (吉川村, Yoshikawa-mura) was a village located in Kami District, Kōchi Prefecture, Japan.

As of 2003, the village had an estimated population of 2,069 and a density of 486.82 persons per km^{2}. The total area was 4.25 km^{2}.

On March 1, 2006, Yoshikawa, along with the towns of Akaoka, Kagami, Noichi and Yasu (all from Kami District), was merged to create the city of Kōnan and no longer exists as an independent municipality.
