= Yumiko Kurahashi =

Japanese writer

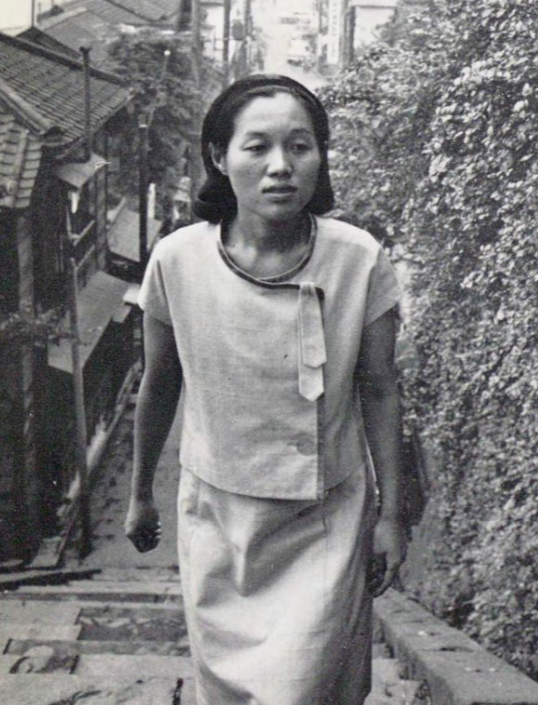
- Born: October 10, 1935; Tosayamada, Kami district, Kōchi prefecture, Empire of Japan
- Died: June 10, 2005 (aged 69); Tokyo, Japan
- Education: Meiji University; Kyoto Women's University
- Occupations: Writer, translator

Yumiko Kurahashi (倉橋 由美子, Kurahashi Yumiko; October 10, 1935 – June 10, 2005) was a Japanese writer. Her married name was Yumiko Kumagai (熊谷 由美子, Kumagai Yumiko), but she wrote under her birth name.

Her work was experimental and antirealist, questioning prevailing societal norms regarding sexual relations, violence, and social order. Her antinovels employed pastiche, parody, and other elements typical of postmodernist writing.

== Early life and education ==
Kurahashi was born in Kami, Japan, the eldest daughter of Toshio and Misae Kurahashi. Her godfather was Tokutomi Sohō, who knew her father. Her father was a family dentist in the town of Kami in Kōchi Prefecture on the island of Shikoku. After one year studying Japanese literature at the Kyoto Women's University, she moved under pressure from her father to Tokyo to obtain a certificate as a dental hygienist and for medical training. Following her completion of the requirements to take the state exam for medical practice, however, she instead entered the Department of French Literature at Meiji University, where she attended lectures by prominent Japanese post-war literary figures such as Mitsuo Nakamura, Kenji Yoshida, and Ken Hirano. During her university years, Kurahashi was enthusiastically introduced to the body of modern literature, reading Rimbaud, Camus, Kafka, Blanchot, and Valéry. Her thesis was devoted to an analysis of Sartre's treatise Being and Nothingness.

Kurahashi and Kenzaburō Ōe have some biographical similarities: like Kurahashi, Ōe also was born in 1935, grew up on Shikoku, and moved to Tokyo, where he studied French literature, did graduate work on Sartre, and debuted in his student days with politically tinged short stories which drew the recognition of Ken Hirano. At a certain point, though, their paths diverge. Ōe went on to win the Nobel Prize in Literature while the path chosen by Kurahashi led to her ostracization by the Japanese literary world.

== Literary beginnings and controversy ==
While studying for her master's degree, Kurahashi made her literary debut in 1960 with the publication in the Meiji University literary magazine of the story The Party (パルタイ, Parutai), an acute satire on the communist left-wing sentiment commonplace among students at that time, as well as the bureaucratic dogmatism of the Japan Communist Party (JCP) (which was not named but strongly alluded to by the title). The story won a university-wide prize and was commended by the prominent literary critic Ken Hirano in his review in the Mainichi Shimbun. A controversy erupted when Hirano used his influence within the Bundan to have Kurahashi's story reprinted in the prominent literary magazine Bungakukai. The so-called "Parutai Debate" (Parutai ronsо̄) broke out across several literary magazines as Japanese writers and critics debated whether Kurahashi's story had "literary merit" and the propriety of Hirano's promoting it, in what became a proxy war for competing views on the influence of the Communist Party in the literary world. Historian Nick Kapur argues that the Parutai debate also reflected unspoken displeasure within the male-dominated Bundan that a critic as prominent as Hirano was promoting the work of a young female author, in their view at the expense of males. Although the Parutai controversy never reached any definitive conclusion, it won Kurahashi many spoken and unspoken enemies and would shadow her throughout her career.

Also in 1960, Kurahashi published the short novel End of Summer (夏の終り, Natsu no owari), which was also championed by Hirano and was nominated for the Akutagawa Prize. Although Kurahashi did not win, she was considered—along with other new writers debuting at the same time, including Takeshi Kaiko, Shintaro Ishihara, and Kenzaburō Ōe—to be ranked highly among the so-called "third wave" generation of young Japanese writers.

Kurahashi's 1961 novel (in fact antinovel) Blue Journeys (暗い旅, Kuroi tabi), written in the formal second person, caused much controversy among critics and led Jun Etō to accuse her of plagiarism. In Etō's view, Kurahashi's novel simply imitated the earlier novel La modification (Second Thoughts) by the French writer Michel Butor. A fierce debate broke out in the press; Kurahashi's defenders were joined by Takeo Okuno. Whether influenced by the dispute or by the death of her father in 1962, after this Kurahashi left the graduate school.

== Later life and works ==
In 1964 Kurahashi married Tomihiro Kumagai, who was then working as a producer for the Japan Broadcasting Corporation. Despite significant health problems, in 1966 she went to study at the University of Iowa in the United States, where she spent about a year on a Fulbright scholarship.

In 1969 Kurahashi published the phantasmagoric and dystopian novel Adventures of Sumiyakisto Q (スミヤキストQの冒険). A dramatic turnaround in her work was heralded by her novels such as Virginia (1970), Anti-Tragedies (反悲劇) (1971), and The Bridge of Dreams (夢の浮橋) (1971). While she continued to author both short and long stories such as A Castle inside the Castle (城の中の城) (1981), Symposion (シュンポシオン) (1985), and Popoi (1987), her Cruel Fairy Tales for Adults (大人のための残酷童話), and Kurahashi's Short Ghost Stories (倉橋由美子の怪奇掌編) became her most popular works during her lifetime. In 1987 she was awarded the Izumi Kyōka Prize for Literature for her massive antiutopian work Journey to Amanon (アマノン国往還記).

== Final years ==
In her later years, despite her deteriorating health, Kurahashi authored several books, including Kôkan (交歓) (1989), Yume no Kayoiji (夢の通ひ路) (1989), The Gallery of Fantasy Art (幻想絵画館) (1991), Between the Earthly World and the Other World (よもつひらさか往還) (2002), and Cruel Fairy Tales for Old People (老人のための残酷童話) (2003). Kurahashi is also known for her translation of children's literature such as Shel Silverstein's The Missing Piece (ぼくを探しに) (1977) and The Missing Piece Meets the Big O (ビッグ・オーとの出会い : 続ぼくを探しに) (1982). Her last work was a new translation of Antoine de Saint-Exupéry's The Little Prince, which she finished one day before her death.

Yumiko Kurahashi died at the age of 69 of dilated cardiomyopathy. The disease was incurable, but Kurahashi consistently refused even those operations which could have prolonged her life.

== Works in English ==
- Adventures of Sumiyakista Q (スミヤキストQの冒険, 1969) translated by Dennis Keene. ISBN 978-0-70221-329-8
- The Woman with the Flying Head and Other Stories translated by Atsuko Sakaki. ISBN 978-0-76560-158-2
  - "An Extraterrestrial ", "We Are Lovers", "The House of the Black Cat", "The Woman with the Flying Head", "The Trade", "The Witch Mask", "Spring Night Dreams", "The Passage of Dreams", "The Special Place", "Flower Abstraction", "The Long Passage of Dreams"
- "Partei" (1960) translated by Yukiko Tanaka and Elizabeth Hanson, in ISBN 978-0-80471-130-2
- "To Die at the Estuary" (Kako ni Shisu, 1971) translated by Dennis Keene, in ISBN 978-0-23113-804-8
- “Scorpions” (1968 novella) translated by Michael Day was published by Wakefield Press January 20th, 2026
