= Yokohama Anpanman Children's Museum & Mall =

Coordinates: 35.463056°N 139.628722°E

Yokohama Anpanman Children's Museum (横浜アンパンマンこどもミュージアム, Yokohama Anpanman Kodomo Myūjiamu) is a complex in Minato Mirai 21, Yokohama, Kanagawa Prefecture, Japan. It is a complex facility combining a participatory museum and shopping mall themed around 'Anpanman'. Dedicated to Takashi Yanase's popular Anpanman franchise. It is one of five such complexes in Japan (the others being in Kobe, Sendai, Nagoya and Fukuoka).

In 2019, this facility moved to the neighborhood, removed "& Mall" from the facility name and renamed it "Yokohama Anpanman Children's Museum".

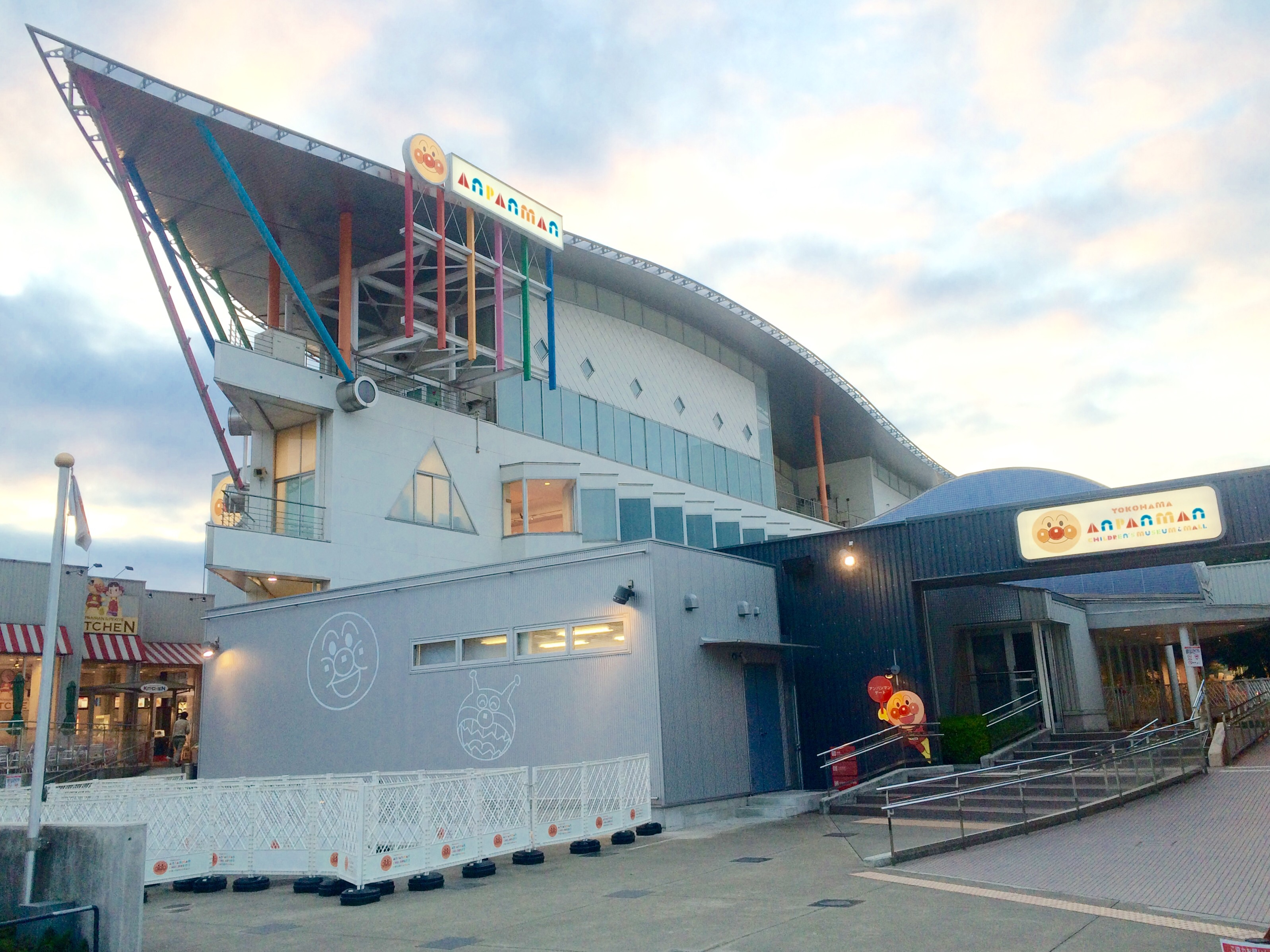
Yokohama Anpanman Children's Museum & Mall
(Old facility from 2007 to 2019)

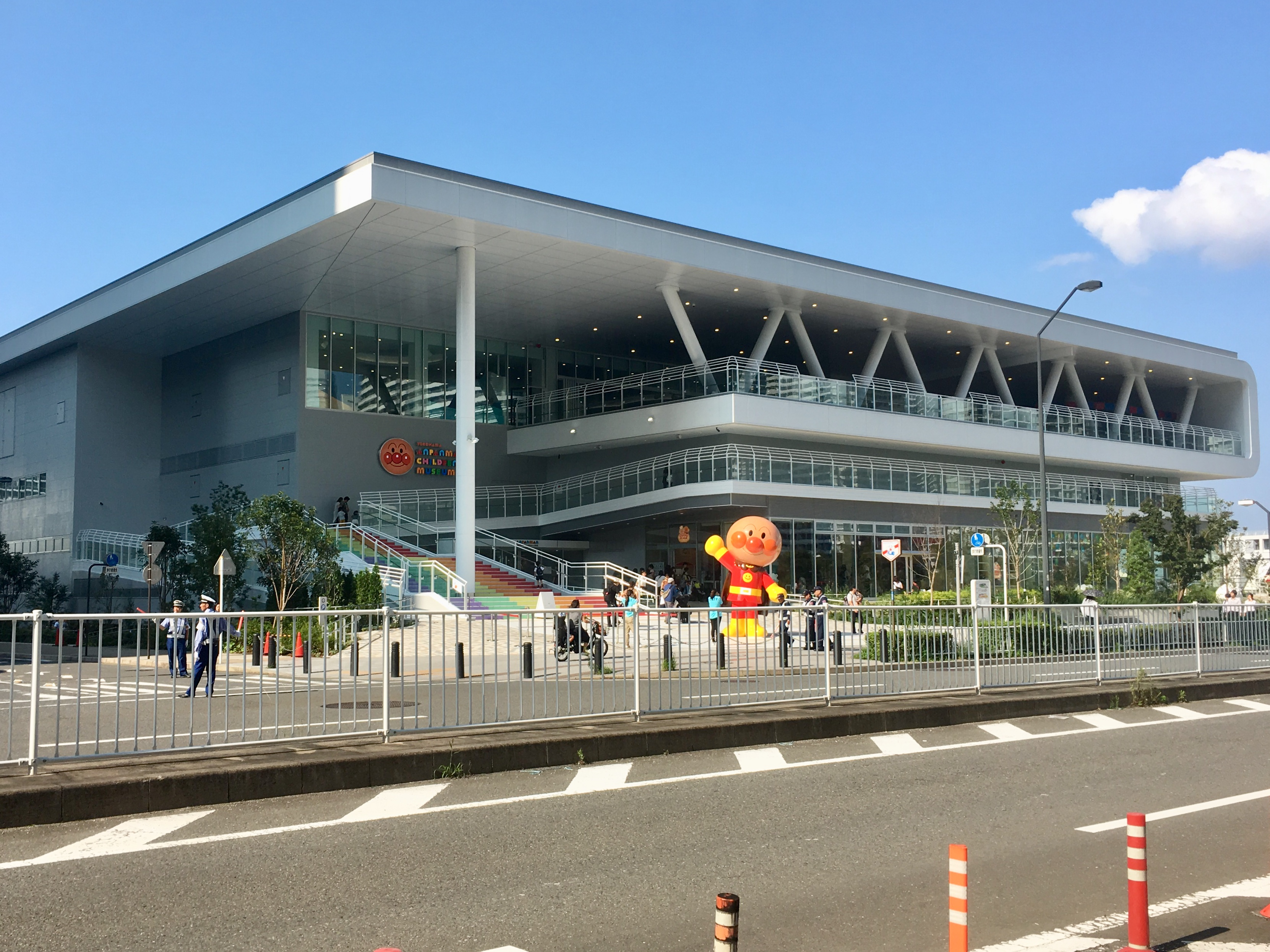
Yokohama Anpanman Children's Museum
(New facility from 2019)
