= Ito Imada =

Japanese farmer

- Born: Ito Nishida; April 6, 1891; Hiroshima-ken, Japan
- Died: October 21, 1987 (age 96); Richmond, British Columbia, Canada
- Other names: Itoko Imada, Imada Ito
- Occupations: Farmer, cook, writer

Ito Imada (April 6, 1891 – October 21, 1987), before marriage Ito Nishida, was a Japanese farmer, cook, and memoirist who lived in western Canada.

== Early life ==
Nishida was born near Hiroshima. She married Kaichi Imada, a man from her village who emigrated to Vancouver, first by proxy in 1910, and again in Canada in 1911.

== Career ==
In 1911, Imada moved to Canada to be with her husband. She worked in a hotel, then did laundry and cooked in logging camps. She washed and cooked daily meals for more than two dozen people in one camp, often with very limited supplies. She gave birth to her first child and only daughter in a logging camp, with no other woman and no medical help nearby. In 1922, the Imadas bought farmland in the Fraser Valley, and she raised hens, fruits, and vegetables. They visited Japan in 1939, to arrange a marriage for their eldest son.

During World War II, Japanese Canadians were evacuated from the West Coast, and the Imadas lost their land and most of their possessions in their forced removal. Meanwhile, her son Tom served in the Canadian and British armies as a translator and interrogator.

After her husband died in 1947, Imada tried to recover some of their property; she was the first claimant to testify before the Japanese Property Claims Commission, also known as the Bird Commission. As an older widow with no paper record of the sale, she had difficulty proving the value of the property confiscated by the Custodian of Enemy Property.

== Personal life and legacy ==
The Imadas had six children. Her husband died in 1947. She died in 1987, at the age of 96, in Richmond, British Columbia. After her death, historian Michiko Midge Ayukawa translated Iwada's unpublished memoirs, covering the period of 1941 to 1971 and handwritten in a personal dialect combining Japanese, English, and some local Hiroshima elements, for her master's thesis in 1990. The original manuscript of Imada's memoir, and Ayukawa's translation, are in the University of British Columbia Library.
