= Kochi University of Technology =

University in Kochi, Japan

Coordinates: 33°37′15″N 133°43′11″E

- 高知工科大学
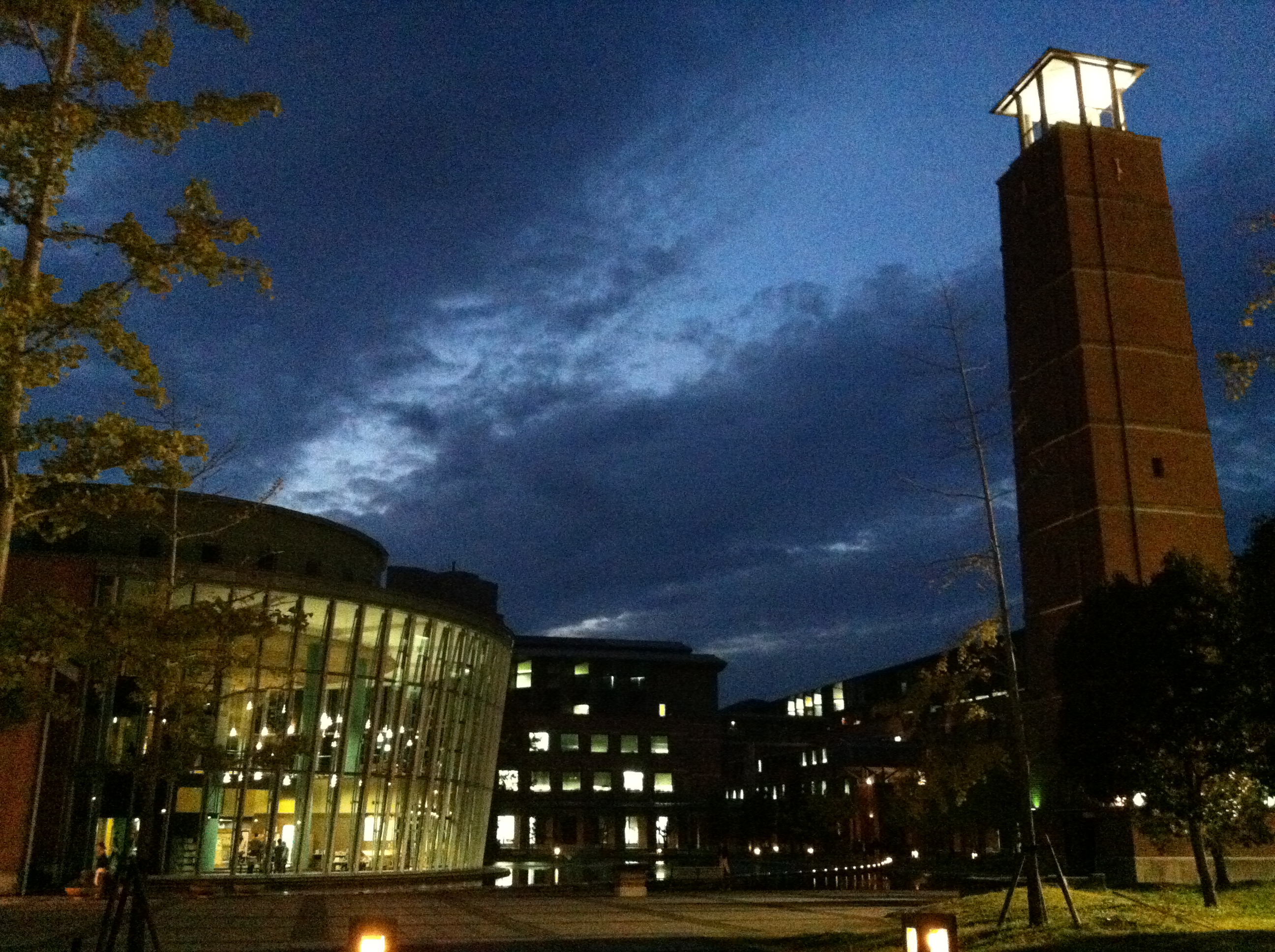
- Kochi University of Technology building
- Motto: Making KUT a world class university through the pursuit of unique excellence
- Type: Public
- Established: 1997; 29 years ago
- President: ISOBE Masahiko
- Location: Kami, Kochi, Japan
- Website: kochi-tech.ac.jp
- As of November 2017

Kochi University of Technology (高知工科大学, Kōchi Kōka Daigaku) is a prefectural university in Tosa Yamada, Kami, Kōchi, Japan. After its foundation in 1997, Professor Yasuharu Suematsu was its first president. Kochi University of Technology serves 2056 undergraduate students, 224 Master students and 74 Doctoral students (as of May 1, 2013).

== School ==
- School of Systems Engineering
- School of Environmental Science and Engineering
- School of Information
- School of Economics & Management

== Graduate School ==
- Master's Program
  - Intelligent Mechanical Systems Engineering Course
  - Electronic and Photonic Systems Engineering Course
  - Infrastructure Systems Engineering Course
  - Environmental and Mathematical Sciences Course
  - Chemistry Course
  - Life Science and Technology Course
  - Materials Science and Engineering Course
  - Informatics Course
  - Entrepreneur Engineering Management Course
  - Advanced Educational Practice Course
- Doctoral Program
  - Engineering Course
  - Entrepreneur Engineering Management Course
  - Special Course for Mid-career Professionals
