= Kobe Anpanman Children's Museum & Mall =

Children's museum in Kobe, Japan

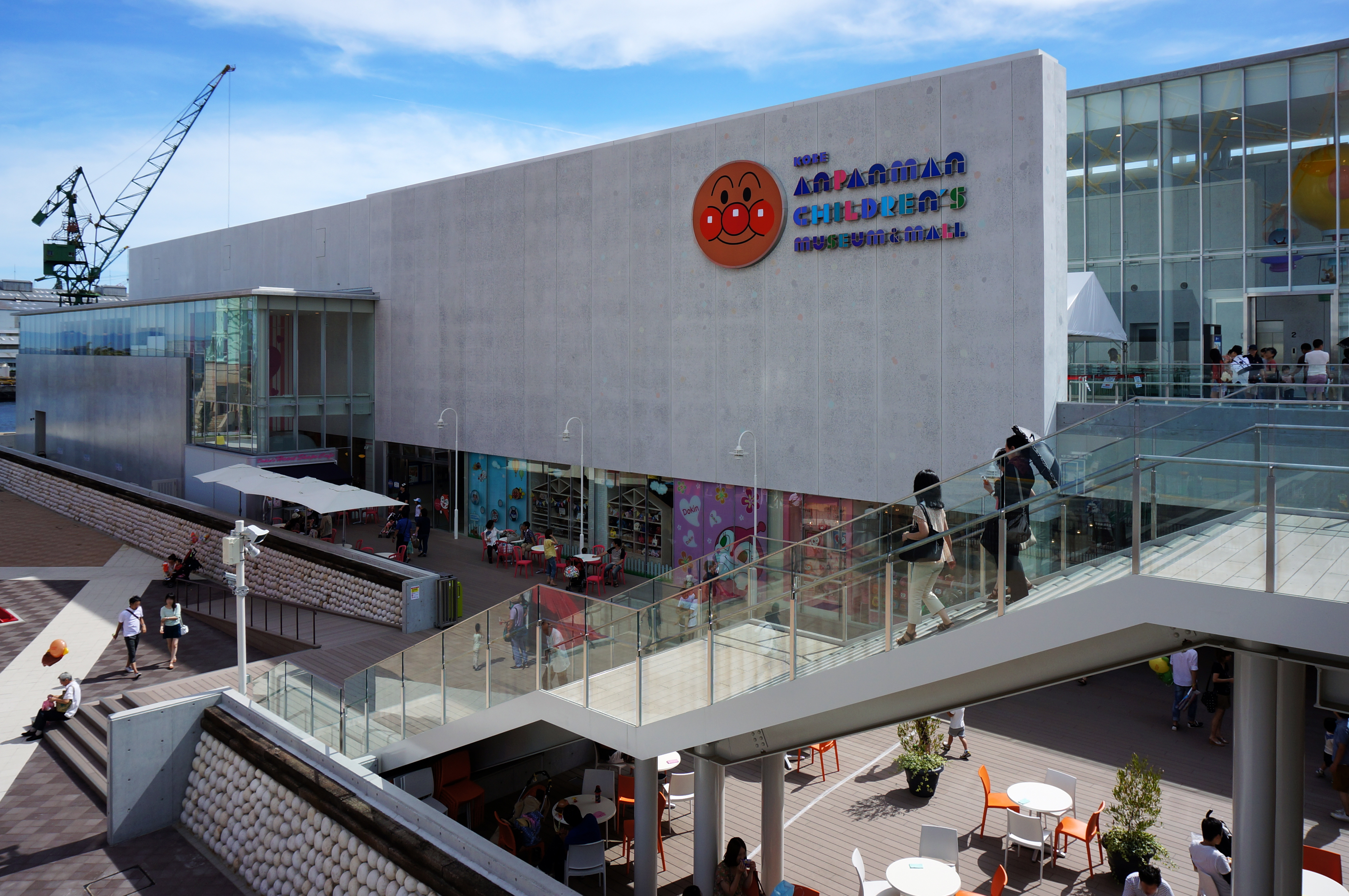
- The exterior of the complex
- Interactive map of Kobe Anpanman Children's Museum & Mall
- Location: 1-6-2 Higashikawasaki-cho, Chuo-ku, Kobe, Hyogo Prefecture 650-0044, Japan
- Coordinates: 34°40′43″N 135°11′06″E
- Opened: 2013
- Website: Official website

The Kobe Anpanman Children's Museum & Mall (神戸アンパンマンこどもミュージアム＆モール) is an interactive children's museum located in Kobe, Japan dedicated to Takashi Yanase's popular Anpanman franchise. It is one of five such complexes in the country (the others being in Yokohama, Sendai, Nagoya and Fukuoka), and also the newest, having been opened in 2013.
