= Kami, Kōchi =

Kami 香美市
- City
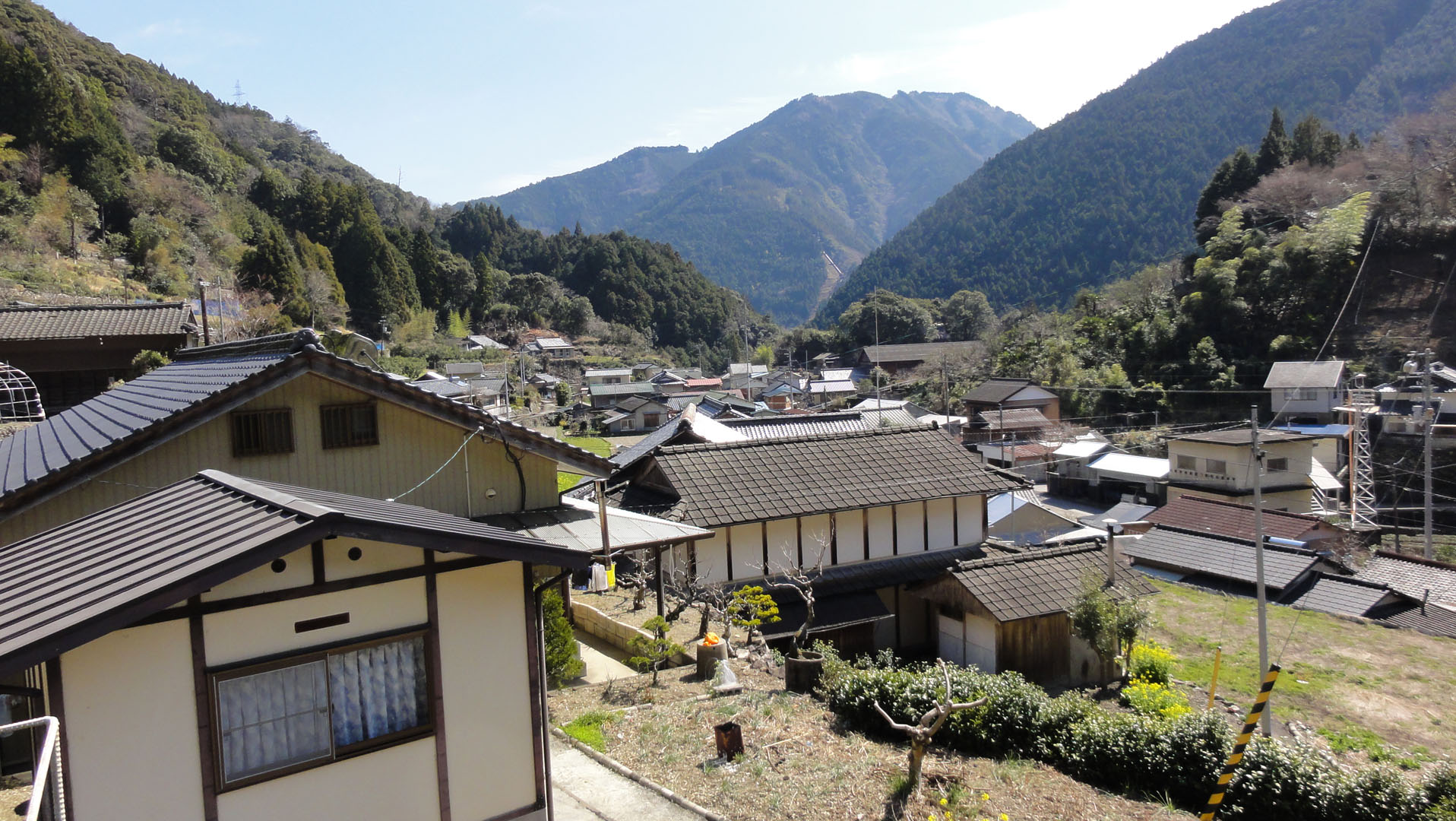
- View of Kami

- Flag Emblem
- Interactive map of Kami
- Location in Japan
- Coordinates: 33°36′N 133°41′E
- Country: Japan
- Region: Shikoku
- Prefecture: Kōchi

Government
  - Mayor: Koichiro Yorimitsu

Area
  - Total: 537.86 km^{2} (207.67 sq mi)

Population (July 1, 2022)
  - Total: 25,562
  - Density: 47.525/km^{2} (123.09/sq mi)
- Time zone: UTC+09:00 (JST)
- City hall address: 1-chome, Takaramachi, Tosayamada-cho, Kami-shi, Kochi-ken782-0034
- Climate: Cfa
- Website: Official website

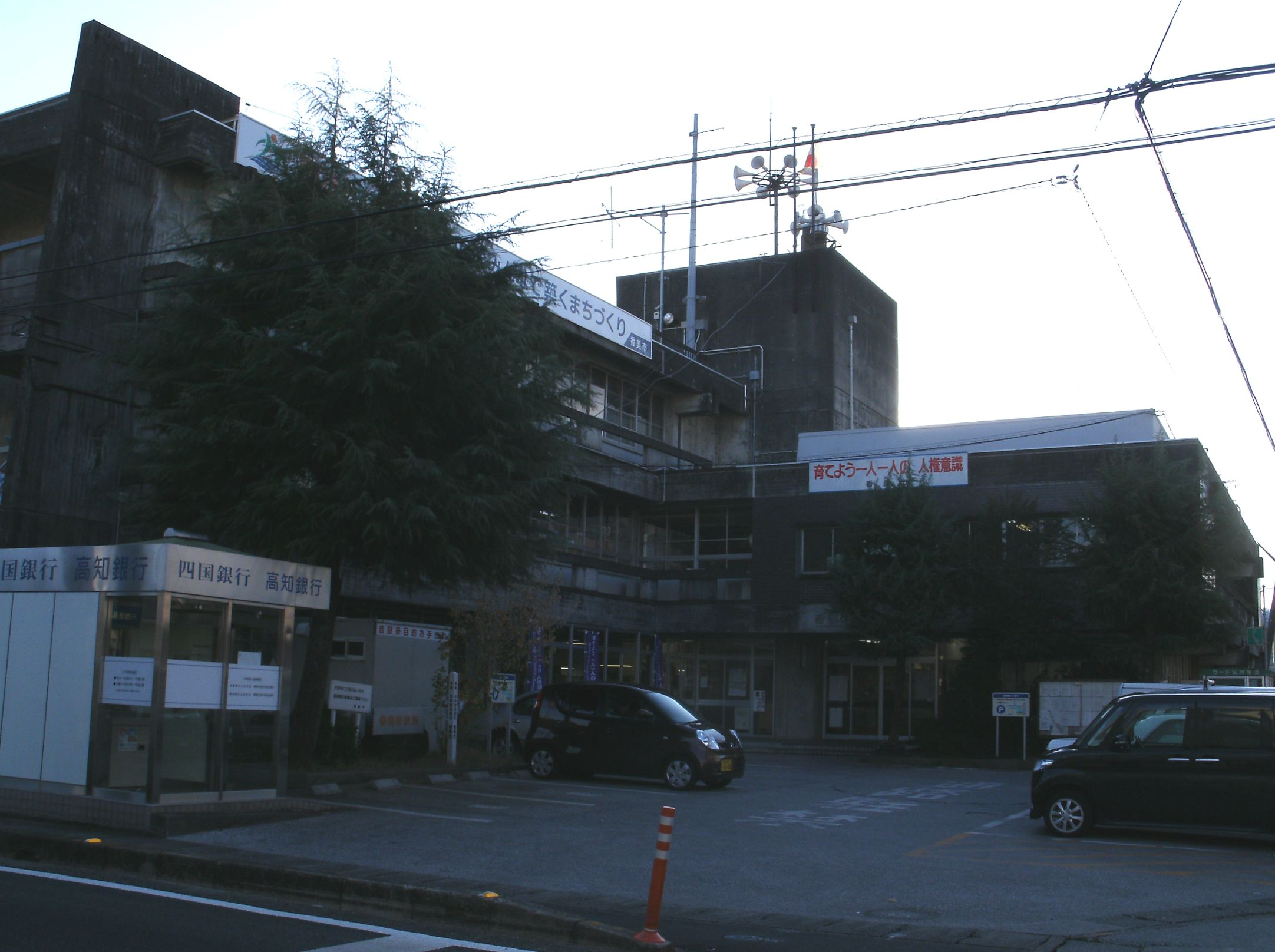
Kami City Hall

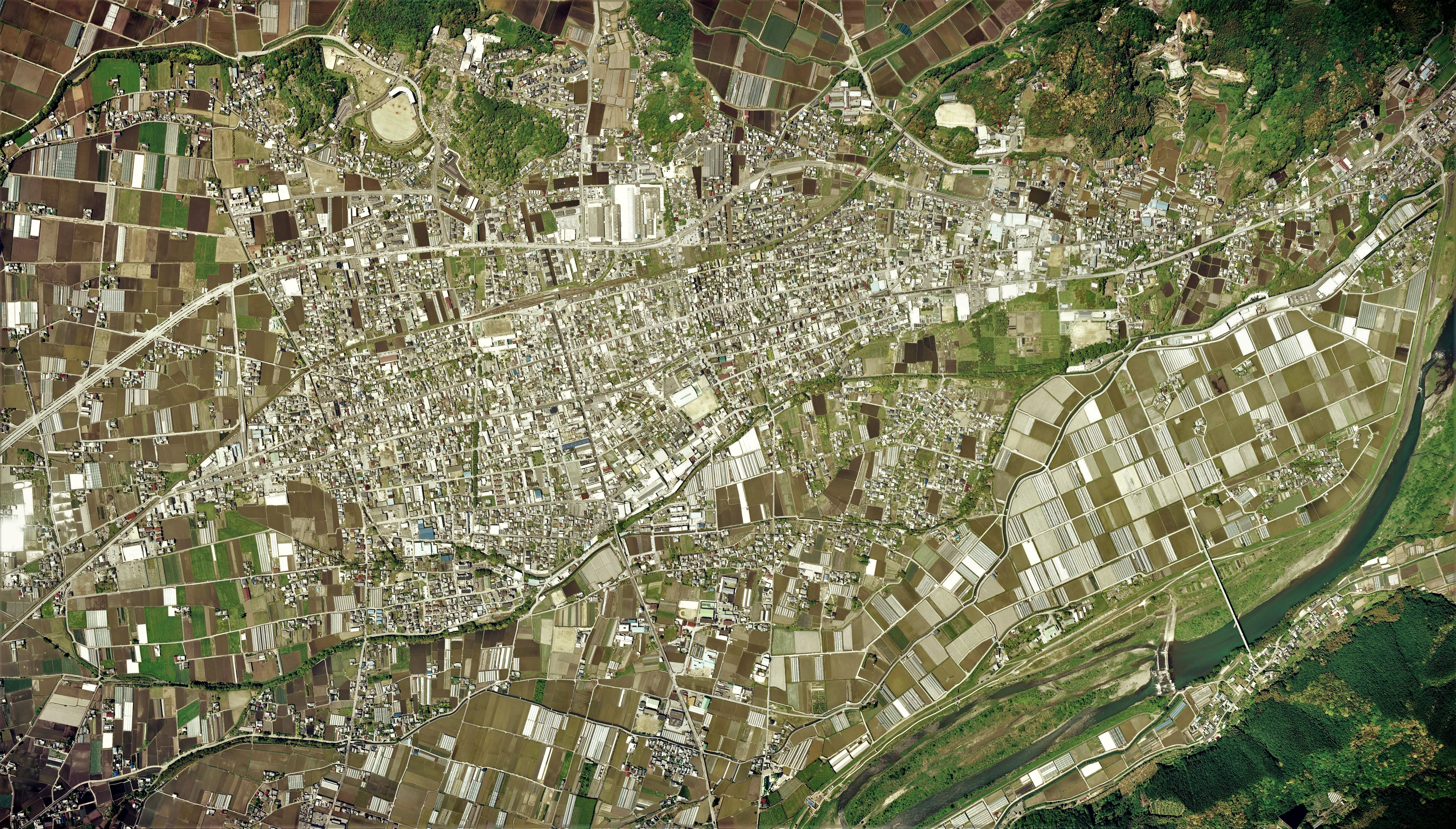
Aerial view of Kami city center

Kami (香美市, Kami-shi) is a city located in Kōchi Prefecture, Japan. As of 1 July 2022, the city had an estimated population of 25,562 in 13212 households and a population density of 48 persons per km^{2}. The total area of the city is 537.86 square kilometres (207.67 sq mi).

== Geography ==
Kami is located in the eastern part of Kōchi Prefecture. It is the only city in Kōchi prefecture that does not face the sea.

=== Neighbouring municipalities ===
Kōchi Prefecture

- Aki
- Kōnan
- Motoyama
- Nankou
- Ōtoyo

Tokushima Prefecture

- Miyoshi
- Naka

=== Climate ===
The climate in the region is warm and temperate, with significant rainfall throughout the year, even in the driest months. January is considered the month with the least amount of rainfall, around 73.0 mm (2.87 in). July is the wettest month, with an average of 473.9 mm (18.66 in). The average annual rainfall is around 2,981.9 mm (117.40 in).

The average annual temperature is 15.2 °C (59.4 °F). August is the warmest month, with an average temperature of 26.0 °C (78.8 °F), and January is the coldest month, reaching an average of 4.6 °C (40.3 °F). According to the Köppen and Geiger climate classification, the climate in that locality is classified as Cfa (humid subtropical climate).

Climate data for Kami (1991−2020 normals, extremes 1977−present)
Month	Jan	Feb	Mar	Apr	May	Jun	Jul	Aug	Sep	Oct	Nov	Dec	Year
Record high °C (°F)	19.1 (66.4)	22.7 (72.9)	25.2 (77.4)	29.4 (84.9)	32.0 (89.6)	34.2 (93.6)	38.7 (101.7)	38.5 (101.3)	35.6 (96.1)	30.8 (87.4)	24.8 (76.6)	22.3 (72.1)	38.7 (101.7)
Mean daily maximum °C (°F)	9.7 (49.5)	11.1 (52.0)	14.8 (58.6)	20.1 (68.2)	24.5 (76.1)	26.8 (80.2)	30.7 (87.3)	31.9 (89.4)	28.4 (83.1)	23.4 (74.1)	17.5 (63.5)	11.9 (53.4)	20.9 (69.6)
Daily mean °C (°F)	4.6 (40.3)	5.6 (42.1)	8.9 (48.0)	13.8 (56.8)	18.3 (64.9)	21.6 (70.9)	25.3 (77.5)	26.0 (78.8)	22.8 (73.0)	17.4 (63.3)	11.7 (53.1)	6.5 (43.7)	15.2 (59.4)
Mean daily minimum °C (°F)	0.5 (32.9)	1.2 (34.2)	3.9 (39.0)	8.4 (47.1)	13.0 (55.4)	17.6 (63.7)	21.5 (70.7)	22.0 (71.6)	18.8 (65.8)	12.9 (55.2)	7.2 (45.0)	2.4 (36.3)	10.8 (51.4)
Record low °C (°F)	−7.2 (19.0)	−7.1 (19.2)	−4.2 (24.4)	−0.6 (30.9)	2.8 (37.0)	8.1 (46.6)	13.3 (55.9)	14.6 (58.3)	7.7 (45.9)	2.6 (36.7)	−1.1 (30.0)	−4.3 (24.3)	−7.2 (19.0)
Average precipitation mm (inches)	73.0 (2.87)	123.9 (4.88)	189.0 (7.44)	231.8 (9.13)	260.1 (10.24)	383.5 (15.10)	473.9 (18.66)	391.8 (15.43)	395.6 (15.57)	208.7 (8.22)	123.5 (4.86)	101.2 (3.98)	2,981.9 (117.40)
Average precipitation days (≥ 1.0 mm)	7.5	8.4	11.0	10.4	10.8	14.8	13.7	12.6	12.6	9.3	7.8	7.0	125.9
Mean monthly sunshine hours	156.9	153.5	176.0	193.0	193.2	130.0	152.9	178.3	146.9	167.8	154.2	154.8	1,957.4
Source: Japan Meteorological Agency

== Demographics ==
Per Japanese census data, the population of Kami in 2020 is 26,513 people. Kami has been conducting censuses since 1960.

Historical population
Year	Pop.	±%
1960	43,319	—
1965	39,238	−9.4%
1970	35,553	−9.4%
1975	34,482	−3.0%
1980	33,878	−1.8%
1985	34,016	+0.4%
1990	32,401	−4.7%
1995	31,076	−4.1%
2000	31,175	+0.3%
2005	30,257	−2.9%
2010	28,766	−4.9%
2015	27,513	−4.4%
2020	26,513	−3.6%
Kami population statistics

== History ==
As with all of Kōchi Prefecture, the area of Kami was part of ancient Tosa Province. During the Edo period, the area was part of the holdings of Tosa Domain ruled by the Yamauchi clan from their seat at Kōchi Castle. The area was organized into villages within Kami District with the creation of the modern municipalities system on April 1, 1889. The city of Kami was established on March 1, 2006, from the merger of the towns of Kahoku and Tosayamada, and the village of Monobe. On the same day, the remaining municipalities of Kami District merged to form the city of Kōnan, and the district was abolished as a result.

== Government ==
Kami has a mayor-council form of government with a directly elected mayor and a unicameral town council of 20 members. Kami contributes one member to the Kōchi Prefectural Assembly. In terms of national politics, the city is part of Kōchi 1st district of the lower house of the Diet of Japan.

== Economy ==
Kami's economy is centered on agriculture and forestry. The production of forged knives is a traditional local handicraft.

== Education ==
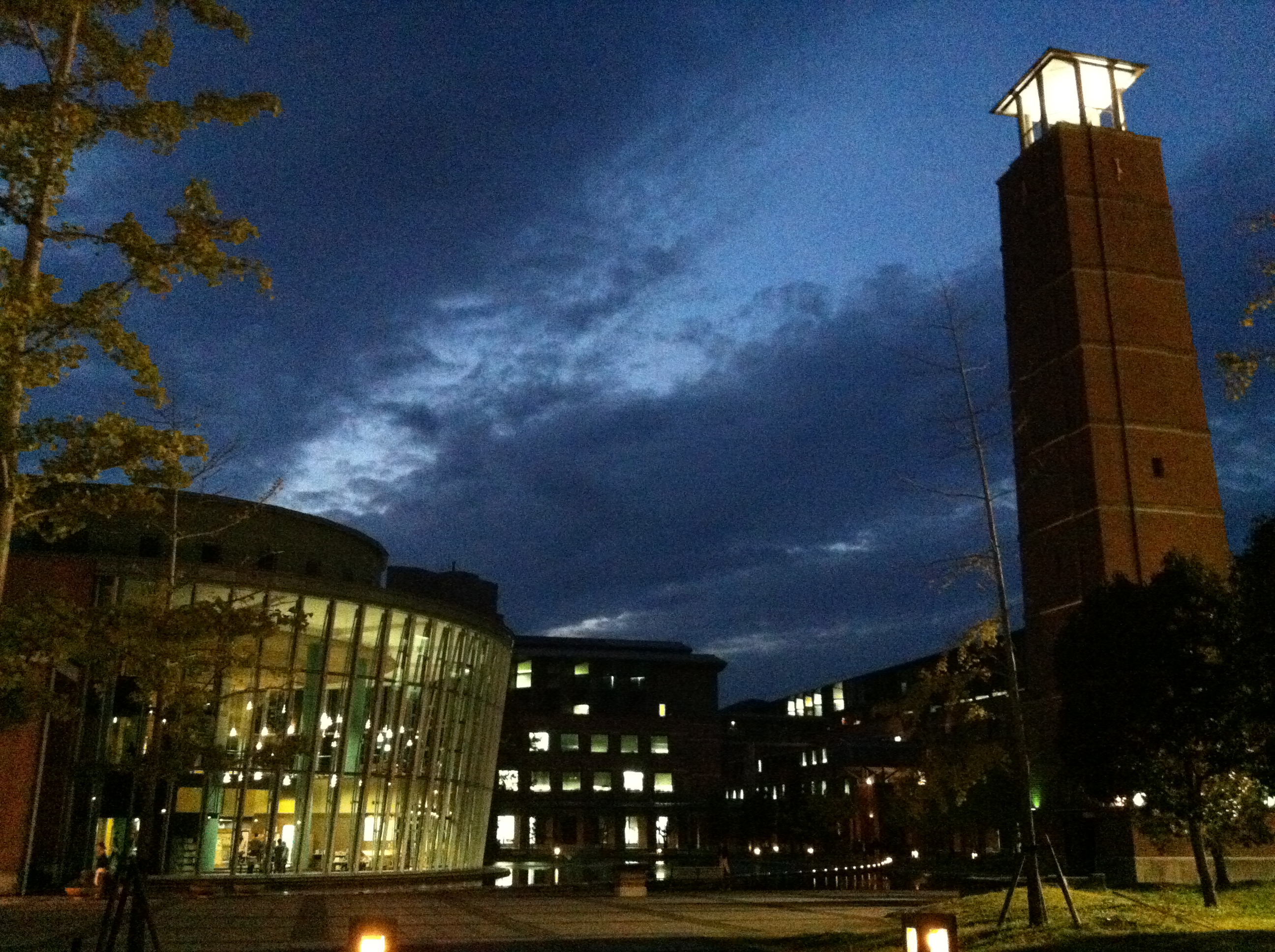
Kochi University of Technology

Kami has seven public elementary schools and three public middle schools operated by the city government, and one public high school operated by the Kōchi Prefectural Board of Education. The Kochi University of Technology is located in Kami.

== Transportation ==
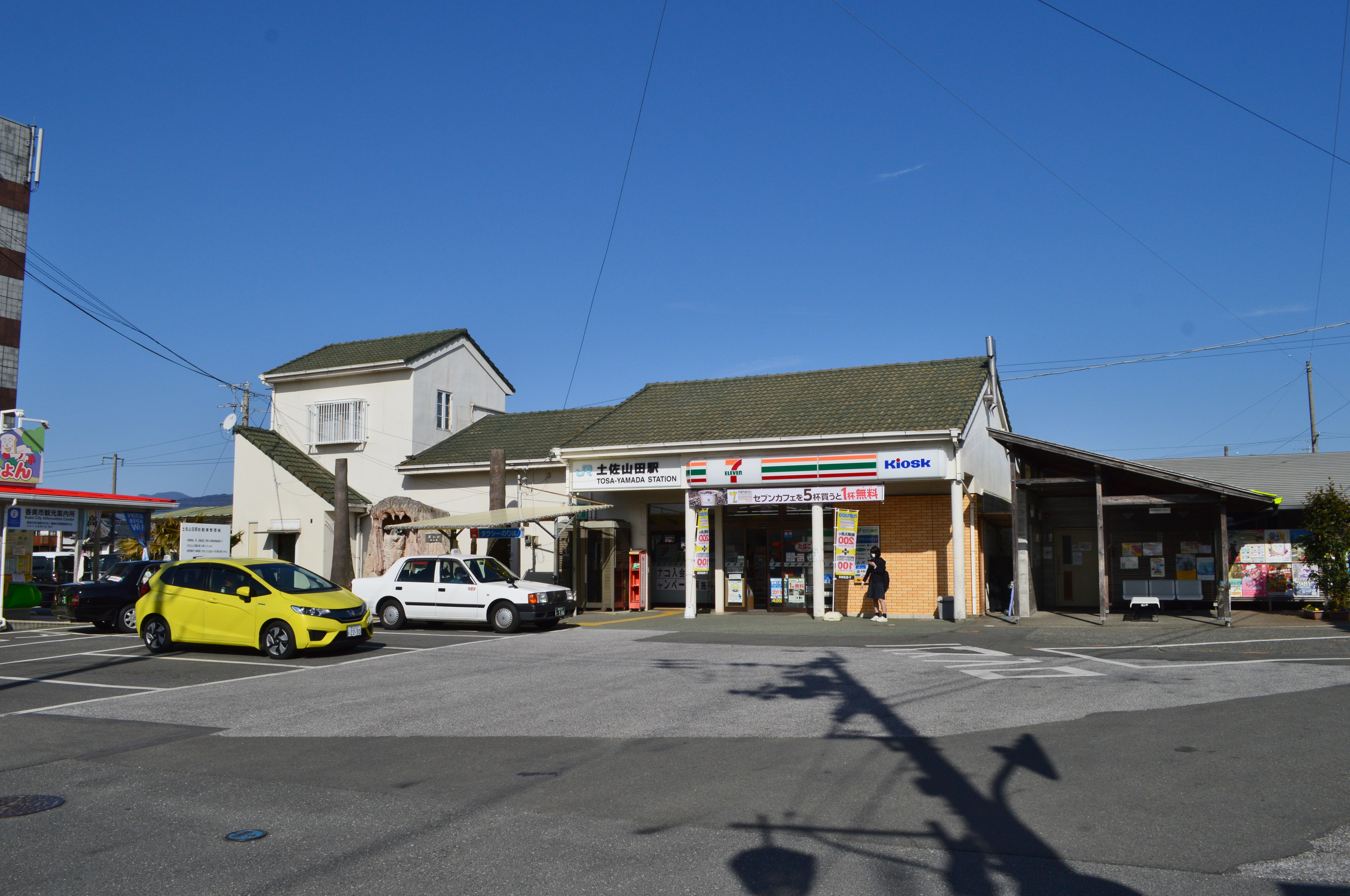
Tosa-Yamada Station

=== Railway ===
Shikoku Railway Company - Dosan Line

- Shigetō - Shingai - Tosa-Yamada - Yamada-Nishimachi

=== Highways ===
- Kōchi Expressway
- National Route 32
- National Route 195

== Sister cities ==
- Largo, Florida, United States, since 1969

== Local attractions ==
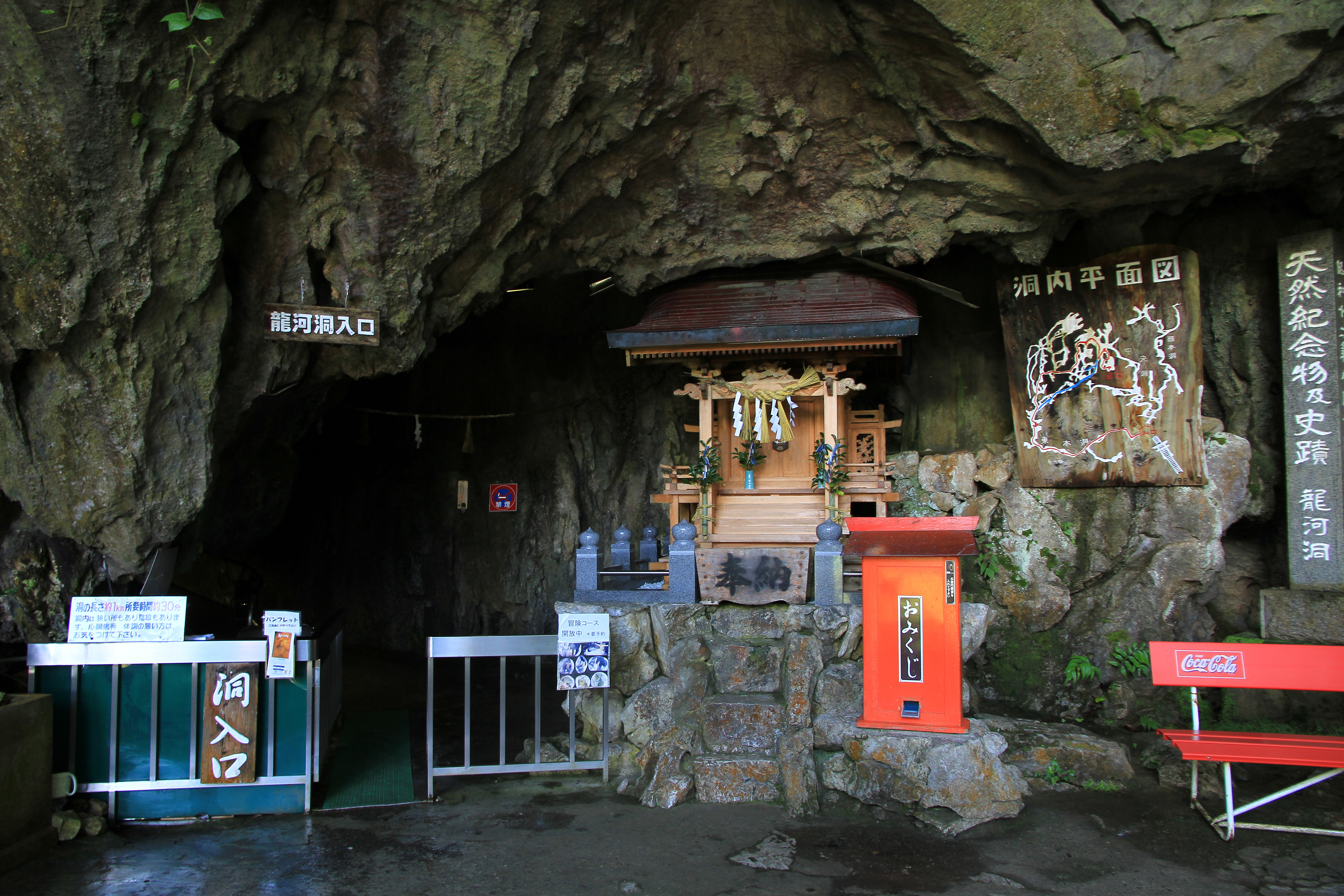
Ryugado

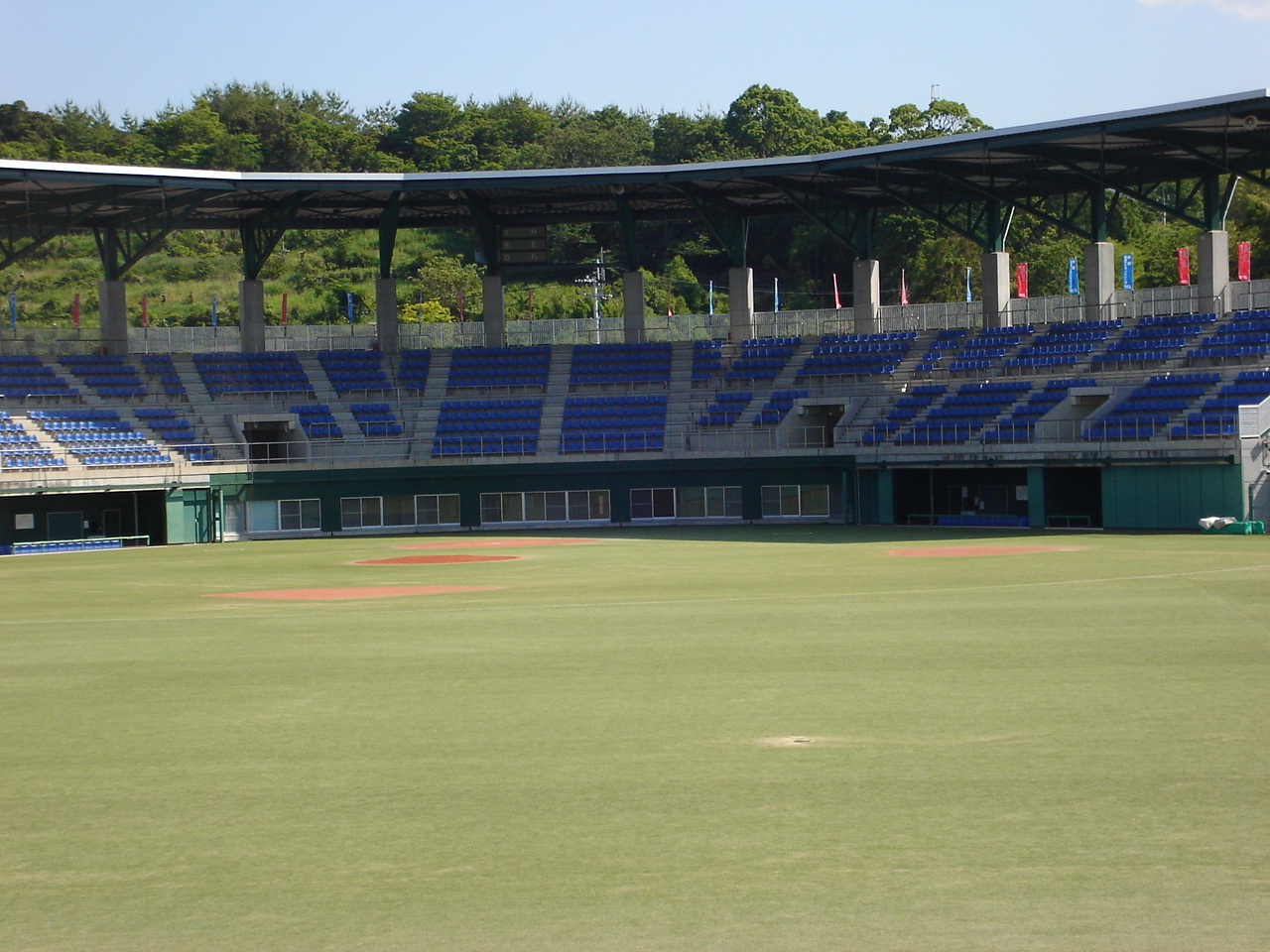
TosaYamada stadium

- Ryūga Cave, Natural Monument and National Historic Site
- TosaYamada stadium
- Yanase Takashi Memorial Hall

== Noted people from Kami ==
- Takenori Emoto
- Taira Hara, manga artist born in Tosayamada
- Keisuke Katto
- Yoshitaka Katori
- Yumiko Kurahashi (1935–2005), writer and antinovelist.
- Takashi Yanase

== See also ==
- Naming citation for asteroid 26097 Kamishi
