= Kami District, Kōchi =

Former district in Kōchi prefecture, Japan

Kami (香美郡, Kami-gun) was a district located in Kōchi Prefecture, Japan.

As of 2003, the district had an estimated population of 64,104 and a density of 96.44 persons per km^{2}. The total area was 664.70 km^{2}.

== Towns and villages ==
Merged forming the city of Kami:

- Kahoku
- Monobe
- Tosayamada

Merged forming the city of Kōnan:

- Akaoka
- Kagami
- Noichi
- Yasu
- Yoshikawa

== Mergers ==
- On March 1, 2006 - the towns of Akaoka, Kagami, Noichi and Yasu, and the village of Yoshikawa were merged to create the city of Kōnan.
- On March 1, 2006 - the towns of Kahoku and Tosayamada, and the village of Monobe were merged to create the city of Kami. Kami District was dissolved as a result of this merger.
