= Katsuyori Imada =

Japanese writer

Katsuyori Imada (今田 勝与, Imada Katsuyori, 1878–1950) was a Japanese writer of the Meiji period. Katsuyori was the son of Imada Manma (今田 萬橘), the official armorer of the Aizu domain. Upon entering the University of Tokyo in 1893, Katsuyori was assisted by then-president Yamakawa Kenjirō, a fellow Aizu native.
