= Kahoku, Kōchi =

Dissolved municipality in Kōchi prefecture, Japan

Kahoku (香北町, Kahoku-chō) was a town located in Kami District, Kōchi Prefecture, Japan.

As of 2003, the town had an estimated population of 5,507 and a density of 42.24 persons per km^{2}. The total area was 130.37 km^{2}.

On March 1, 2006, Kahoku, along with the town of Tosayamada, and the village of Monobe (all from Kami District), was merged to create the city of Kami and no longer exists as an independent municipality.
