= Yanase Takashi Memorial Hall =

Coordinates: 33.6477°N 133.7837°E

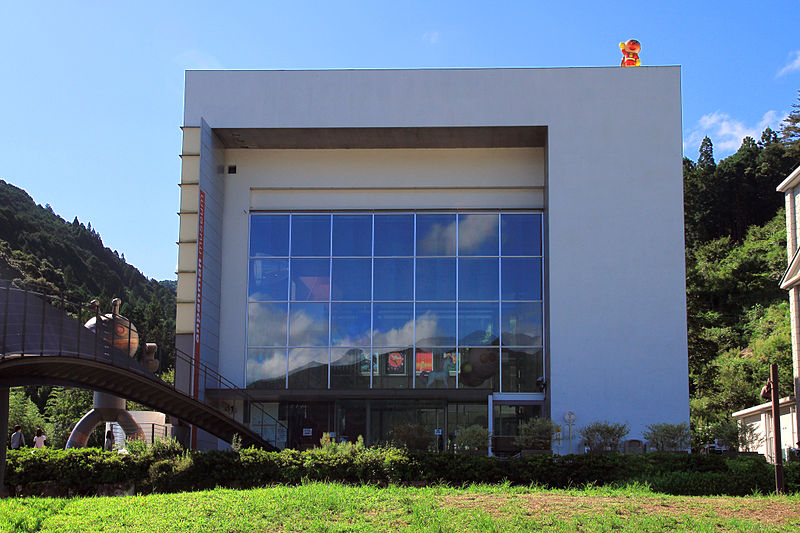
Yanase Takashi Memorial Hall

Yanase Takashi Memorial Hall (香美市立やなせたかし記念館, Kami Shiritsu Yanase Takashi Kinenkan) is a museum in Kami, Kōchi Prefecture, Japan. It is dedicated to the life and works of Takashi Yanase (February 6, 1919 – October 13, 2013), who was a Japanese writer, poet, illustrator and lyricist.
