= Masataka Murata =

Japanese physician (1884–1974)

- Born: October 5, 1884; Kōchi Prefecture, Japan
- Died: December 20, 1974 (aged 90)
- Occupations: Physician, Director of a leper hospital, Sotojima Hoyoen Sanatorium, in Osaka
- Known for: Serodiagnosis of syphilis, Murata's method, Studies on leprosy

Masataka Murata (村田 正太, Murata Masataka; October 5, 1884 – December 20, 1974) was a Japanese physician. He invented a Murata's method for the serodiagnosis of syphilis, and studied leprosy. He worked at the Osaka Prefectural Sotojima Sanatorium and was the director between 1926 and 1933. He treated leprosy patients as respectable persons. After the Sotojima Incident, in which communists were against religious societies, he resigned as the director of the sanatorium. Later, he personally studied leprosy at his house, and died in 1974.

== Life ==
He was born in Kōchi Prefecture in 1884. When he was studying laws, he was interested in leprosy since a woman he knew developed leprosy. He asked Kensuke Mitsuda for advice, and studied medicine at Tokyo University following his advice. He worked in the Institute of Infectious Diseases and invented Murata's method for serodiagnosis of syphilis. In 1926 he assumed the post of the director of Osaka Prefectural Sotojima Sanatorium. In 1928, he was one of the founders of the Japanese Leprosy Association, together with Mitsuda.

== The Sotojima Incident and the Typhoon Muroto ==
When Murata assumed the post of director, the sanatorium was a troubled place riddled with gambling, and the public morals were very low. First he improved the meals (daily cost improved from 13 sen to 22 sen) and allowed some patient control. In 1932, communism arose in the sanatorium, and his attitude toward the autonomy of patients was mistaken for his favoring communism. After severe questioning by the police, he decided to quit in 1933. Later he studied leprosy, without taking up any post. He released communists giving each person 10 yen for peace. In 1934, the sanatorium met the very severe Muroto typhoon, and many patients and workers died. Survivors were sent to other sanatoriums, and the new Oku-Komyoen Sanatorium was established in 1938 in Nagashima neighboring the Nagashima Aiseien Sanatorium, the successor to the Sotojima Hoyoen.

== Character ==
- He was said to be an "Igossoh", a stubborn person who sticks to his principles. As to leprosy patients, he respected their autonomy, while Kensuke Mitsuda led patients, while he regarded himself as the father of the family.
