= Takekichi Sugai =

Japanese dermatologist (1871–1944)

- Born: 1871; Kyoto Prefecture, Japan
- Died: 1944 (aged 72–73)
- Occupation: Physician (specializing in leprosy)
- Known for: Clinician and researcher in leprosy

Takekichi Sugai (菅井 竹吉, Sugai Takekichi; 1871–1944) was a Japanese dermatologist. He was the first chief doctor at Sotojima Hoyoen Sanatorium (1909–1923) and wrote many papers on leprosy. Sotojima Hoyoen was a public leprosy sanatorium present in Osaka Prefecture between 1909 and 1934.

== Life ==
He was born in 1871, in Kyoto Prefecture. After qualification as a pharmacist in 1890, he studied at Saisei Gakusha, a private medical school and was qualified as a physician in 1892. He worked in Toyama Prefecture, and Osaka Prefecture. In 1897, he studied pathology at University of Tokyo under Professor Yamagiwa. In September 1898, he went to the Yoikuin Hospital Tokyo, two months after Kensuke Mitsuda. In 1903, he taught pathology, forensic medicine and psychiatry at Osaka Higher Medical school. In 1909, he became the chief doctor at the recommendation of the school. In October 1910, he published his studies on immunology in a German journal and became a Ph.D. In July, 1923, he retired from the sanatorium, and died in Feb. 1944.

== Papers ==
- Sugai T, Mononobe K: Relationships between leprosy bacilli and insects. Hifuka Hinyoukika Zasshi, 1909, 1910.
- Sugai T, Mabuchi H: Statistical observations on 200 patients of leprosy. Okayama Ishi, 1910.
  - Infections in families were 27.5%, cited in Nihon Hifuka Zensho.1954.
- Sugai T, Mononob K: Hematological studies in newborn babies and leprosy bacilli in the blood. Osaka Ishi, 1911.
- Sugai T, Monnobe K: Studies of infection in family members, Tokyo Iji Shinshi, 1912.
  - Cited in History of leprosy in Japan, p: Among 95 persons of family infection, father-side infection was 64 persons, mother-side infection was 25 persons and the remaining 6 persons were from both sides.
- Sugai T: Susceptibility of leprosy in animals. Tokyo Igakushi, 1902, 1903, 1904, 1907, 1912.
- Sugai T: Agglutination and complement-fixation reactions in leprosy. Osaka and Tokyo Igakushi, 1907, 1907, 1910, 1912.
- Sugai T, Mabushi H: Leprosy and erysipelas. Okayama Ishi, 1910.
- Sugai T, Masaki M: Leprosy and eye diseases. Hifuka Hinyokika Zasshi, 1914.
- Sugai T, Masaki M: Leprosy, tuberculosis and lung cancer. Osaka Igakushi, 1914.
- Sugai T, Mononobe K, Mabuchi I: Serum treatment of leprosy. Osaka Ishi, 1910.
- Sugai T, Kumagai T: Leprosy bacilli in milk. Tokyo Iji, 1915.
- Sugai T, Miyahara A: Leprosy bacilli in amniotic fluid. Igaku Chuoshi, 1915.
- Sugai T, Kawabata K: Fate of leprosy bacilli in the digestive system of animals. Nihon Shokakishi, 1918.
- Sugai T: Leprosy and maggots. Hifuka Hinyokika Zasshi, 1922.
- Sugai T: Leprosy nodules in the ventricle of the brain. Igaku Chuoshi, 1915.
- Sugai T, Kagawa H: Leprosy and lecithin. Igaku Chuoshi, 1913.
- Sugai T: Leprosy associated with trachoma and conjunctival tuberculosis. Tokyo Iji, 1913.
- Sugai T: Treatment of leprosy(book). Sanshusha, Tokyo, 1914.
- Sugai T: Oral leprosy. Hifuka Hinyokika Zasshi, 1921.
- Sugai T: Chemical treatment of leprosy and tuberculosis. Tokyo Ijishi, 1916.
- Sugai T: Effects of kuupper, thianyl and thiane kali on tuberculosis and leprosy. Hifuka Hinyokika Zasshi, 1916.
- Sugai T: Chemical treatment of leprosy and tuberculosis. Experimental and clinical trials. Nihon Biseibutsugakkaishi, 1917.
- Sugai T: Studies on my treatment method(Kupper, thianyl and thiane kali) for tuberculosis and leprosy. Congratulatory collection of works for 25 years after graduation of Professor Dohi. 1917.
- Sugai T:Reminiscences at Sotojima Sanatorium. Koshu Eiseigaku Zasshi, 41, 7, 1924.
