= Kohsaburo Iesaka =

Japanese dermatologist

Kohsaburo Iesaka or Kōzaburo Iesaka
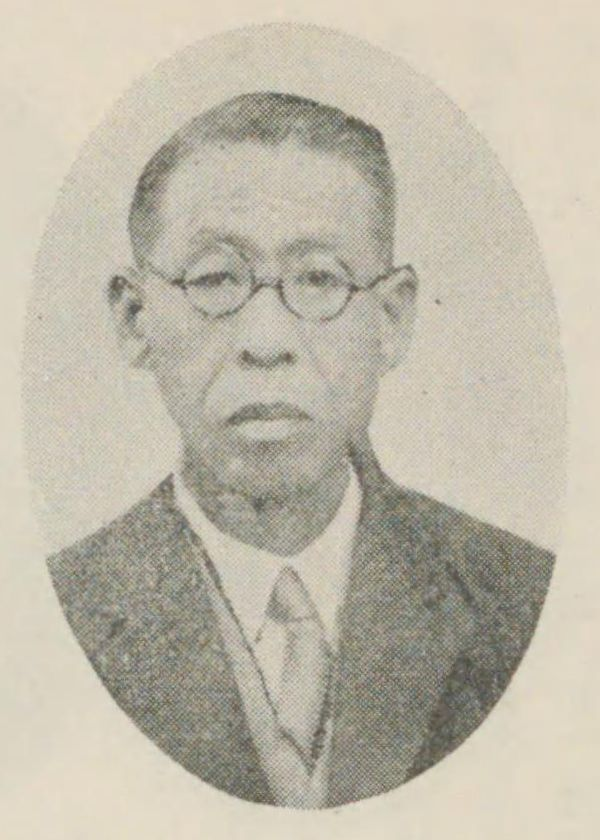
- Born: 1878; Niigata Prefecture, Japan
- Died: 1952 (aged 73–74)
- Occupations: Physician, Director of leper hospitals
- Known for: Physician, Christian, Director of Miyako Nanseien Sanatorium and Okinawa Airakuen Sanatorium. The church he created as "Yomigaerino Kai" still remains in the Miyako Nanseien Sanatorium

Kohsaburo Iesaka (家坂 幸三郎, Iesaka Kōsaburō; 1878 – 1952) was a Japanese Christian physician who headed the Miyako Nanseien Sanatorium (1933–1938) and Okinawa Airakuen Sanatorium (1947–1951). The church he created, "Yomigaerino Kai", still remains in the Miyako Nanseien Sanatorium, as well as a church of Nippon Sei Ko Kai and a catholic church.

== Life ==
In 1878, Iesaka was born in Niigata Prefecture. After graduating from the English Political Course at Waseda University, he graduated from Kumamoto Medical School in 1906. In 1922, he became a medical officer of the Okinawa Prefecture. He was nominated the director of Miyako Nanseien Sanatorium in October 1933. For private reason, he left the sanatorium in 1938. Between 1946 and 1951, he was the director of Okinawa Airakuen Sanatorium. He died in 1952.

== Miyako Nanseien Sanatorium ==
Previously, the directors of the sanatorium came from the Police Section of the Okinawa Prefecture, and he was the first physician-director. "As the director of this sanatorium, I will treat your diseased body as well as your soul, and thereby, will let your walk on the road of light, and let you be brought to life (Yomigaeru) through God. I will do my best.

In 1934, Nakakaneku, who was under the influence of Keisai Aoki came to Miyako and Iesaka and Nakakaneku became friends. In 1935, 7 patients were baptized through Kanji Otobe who came from the church of Hannah Riddell. On April 25, 1935, an organization, "Yomigaeri No Kai", was formed with 20 Christians and 30 people interested in his religion. This church outlived the war. He was popular with the patients since barbed wire fences and a special prison were not built.

== Okinawa Airakuen Sanatorium ==
Michiko Ito, a Christian nurse who worked with Iesaka in Okinawa Airakuen Sanatorium said that he was a liberal person with a view against the segregation policy of leprosy patients. Iesaka persuaded those against leprosy patients into believing that they were also brothers and sisters, read the Bible and paid with his own pocket money for people with leprosy. He used to say that if the circumstances were good, and proper rest and food were available, leprosy will no appear. Ito made intravenous injections of Promin at the order of Iesaka.

== Selected works ==
- Report of medical examination for leprosy at Hisamatsu, Miyako(1939), Repura, 10, 148.
  - At Kugai, 16 patients were found among 1,176 inhabitants and 14 patients at Matsubara among 1,525 inhabitants.
- Report of medical examination for leprosy in Yonaguni Island(1939), Repura 10,152.
  - 35 patients were found and the density was 77.1 per 10,000 inhabitants. All patients were hospitalized.

== Sources ==
- 宮古南静園『宮古南静園 三十周年記念誌』、1961年
- 宮古南静園『開園50周年記念誌』、1981年
- 入園者自治会『創立70周年記念誌』宮古南静園、2001年
- 沖縄らい予防協会『沖縄のらいに関する論文集（医学編）』、1979年
- 沖縄愛楽園『愛楽』、1967年
- 宮古南静園編『沖縄県ハンセン病史料集』
- 沖縄愛楽園『「愛楽誌」開園15周年記念号』、1953年
