= Tatsudaryo incident =

Tatsudaryō Incident
- Date: April 4, 1954 - April 18, 1955
- Location: Kurokami Primary School Area, Kumamoto, Japan
- Caused by: Public schooling of children born of leprosy patients
- Goals: Public schooling of children
- Methods: Strike of schooling, terakoya schooling, hunger strike
- Status: Occasional conflicts for one year
- Result: Mediation by Morio Takahashi who cared children

Parties
Citizens of the school area who favored schooling	Citizens of the school area who were against schooling	Kumamot District Legal Affairs Bureau, Kumamoto City Education Committee

Lead figures
Matsuki Miyazaki of Kikuchi Keifuen Sanatorium	Top of Parent Teacher Association who was against schooling

Number
420 favored schooling at the start	795 were against schooling at the start	

Casualties and losses
None	None	

Tatsudaryō Incident (龍田寮事件, Tatsudaryō jiken) or Kurokamikō Incident (黒髪校事件, Kurokamikō jiken) occurred in 1954, when children of leprosy patients were denied public schooling because parents of the public school children feared their children might contract leprosy. This became national news. The issues were the right of children to attend public school despite their parents illness, the right of the general public to avoid contagion, the accuracy of the predictions made by the medical community, and the rights of the local community over national control of education.

== Background ==
When leprosy sanatoriums were constructed in 1909, the question arose concerning the care of children born to leprosy patients. In the Kyushu Sanatorium, now the Kikuchi Keifuen Sanatorium, healthy, non-resident relatives of the family were directed to care for the children of leprosy patients. Another option was to allow the Tairo-in Sanatorium, or Tairoin Hospital take care of the children with funding provided by the leprosy prevention association.

The following is a sample list of fees for children boarded out.

A fee list for the care of children born to leprosy patients
child	sex	age	care institution	fee
1	girl	2	Tairoin	7yen
2	girl	7	-	7yen
3	girl	7	Tairoin	7yen
4	girl	8	Tairoin	1yen50sen
5	girl	8	Tairoin	1yen50sen
6	girl	8	Tairoin	1yen50sen
7	boy	8	-	7yen
8	boy	8	relative	7yen
9	boy	9	-	7yen
10	girl	9	relative	7yen
11	girl	9	relative	7yen
12	girl	9	Tairoin	5yen
13	girl	11	relative	1yen50sen
14	girl	11	Tairoin	1yen50sen
15	boy	11	Tairoin	1yen50sen
16	girl	12	Tairoin	1yen50sen
17	girl	12	Tairoin	1yen50sen
18	girl	13	Tairoin	1yen50sen
19	girl	14	Tairoin	1yen50sen
20	girl	14	Tairoin	1yen50sen
21	boy	14	relative	7yen
22	girl	14	relative	5yen
23	girl	15	Tairoin	1yen50sen
24	boy	16	Tairoin	1yen50sen
25	girl	16	Tairoin	1yen50sen
26	girl	19	Tairoin	1yen50sen

=== Residence for children ===
In 1935, Keifūen Home was constructed within the campus of Kyushu Sanatorium by the Leprosy Prevention Association for the children of patients with leprosy. In 1941, the Kaishun Byōin, a leper hospital established by Hannah Riddell was disbanded. To replace it, Tatsuda Ryo (dormitory) was constructed with 19,800 yen donated by the hospital. Those patients in the Keifuen Home were transferred to the Tatsuda Ryo.

A school was created within the dormitory. There was one teacher. Education was limited. Patients' children of high school and junior high school age were attending local public schools, but primary school-age students were not.

In 1942, the Kikuchi Keifuen Sanatorium insisted that Kumamoto City should integrate the primary school students, as well. While the city officials agreed, the public school officials declined.

==== Number of primary school pupils in Tatsuda Ryo ====
Twenty-three primary aged children were involved:

Number of primary school pupils
grade	boys	girls	total
first grade	1	3	4
2nd grade	2	2	4
3rd grade	1	3	4
4th grade	2	2	4
5th grade	3	2	5
6th grade	1	1	2
total	10	13	23

=== The Proposal of Matsuki Miyazaki ===
Matsuki Miyazaki was a physician, leprosy specialist, and Director of the Kyushu Sanitorium. In December 1953, he met with the principal of the Kurokami Primary School to ask him to consider admitting children of leprosy patients. He requested an answer by April 1954.

The school principal said he would agree if their Parent Teacher Association (PTA) would agree. Ryunosuke Seguchi was president of the PTA. He was a physician and chairman of the Kyushu Prefectural Assembly. Seguchi said that the problem should be handled cautiously but offered no definitive answer. Miyazaki then sent a formal request to the Kumamoto District Legal Affairs Bureau asking that discrimination in schooling should be halted. Seguchi publicly disagreed with this request. The issue became national news.

== The Incident ==
=== Authorities confront the local PTA ===
On December 9, 1953, there was an annual meeting of the PTA of the Kurokami Primary School. Participants included Miyazaki, Seguchi, members of the city educational committee, and local representatives of the city.

A questionnaire had been sent out to parents. The results of the questionnaire were made public. Those in favor of schooling were 420 (34%), against schooling were 795 (64%) and 14 (2%) were neutral. The Kumamoto District Legal Affairs Bureau expressed the opinion that 1) In four other leprosy sanatoriums, there had been no trouble integrating students without infection. 2) Tadao Toda, a professor of Bacteriology at Kyushu University and Professor Kentaro Higuchi, a professor of dermatology, Kyushu University had expressed the view that non-infected students infecting other pupils with leprosy was inconceivable.

The three ministries of Japan of Education, Justice and Welfare expressed the view that denial of schooling would be illegal. The Ministry of Welfare stated that proper health maintenance could not lead to the infection of leprosy. The ministry of education thought that pupils should attend the school without discrimination, since there was no possibility of infection. The Ministry of Justice stated that the pupils should attend the school.

On March 1, the following policy was established by the Kumamoto District Legal Affairs Bureau that 1) the city education committee should ensure that the pupils attend the public school starting April 1, 1954; 2) the Kikuchi Keifuen Sanatorium should give more strict health maintenance to the pupils. The meeting was attended by the Legal Affairs Bureau staff, the city education committee members and the Kikuchi Keifuen staff.

=== The Opposition Movement started ===
On March 1, 1954, the citizens of the Kurokami Primary School held a meeting on the school grounds. Protestors claimed that although the pupils in the Tatsuda Ryo were said to be not infected, five pupils had been isolated. The protestors did not believe that there was no danger of infection. They were not convinced of the method of treatment.

The rate of developing leprosy among pupils was 0.7%. Based on that statistic, the protestors felt that they could not endanger their 1,800 students. On March 10, Okamoto, the chairman of the city education committee stated at the city assembly that they had reached the conclusion that the pupils should attend the school. This was broadcast on the radio the following day. Members of the PTA intensified their opposition. On March 12, they announced that they would stage a strike.

Some of the members of PTA stated that they would favor integration if a third party would guarantee that the prospective attendees had not been infected. On April 2, a health examination of the four pupils, under question, was conducted at the Department of Dermatology, Kumamoto University. This revealed that the pupils were not infected. On April 7, the city education committee declared that the pupils would attend the school. Dissatisfied, the opposition members went on strike April 8. They displayed a large poster that pupils should not go to school with pupils with leprosy. Initially the strike was a success. Only four pupils attended the school with a kindergarten teacher. 76 pupils went to school out of 1928 registered. On the 5th day, 312 pupils attended the school. The opposition movement side started a type of Terakoya education, namely unofficial private schools at 17 sites. On April 27, there was another examination of the four pupils under question at the Department of Dermatology, Kumamoto University. They announced that one girl needed further examination. This strengthened the opposition movement. Because of the conflict, the principal of the school retired and Toko Kozaki assumed the post of the principal on May 1.

=== The opposition strengthens ===
On June 15, 1954, the opposition movement requested the abolishment of the Tatsuda Dormitory. A conflict started between the two lobbyist groups. Japanese Education Minister Oodate heard from both sides when he visited Kumamoto on October 7.

The group who favored integration of primary students stated that the attitude of the Kurokami Primary School was deplorable, since graduating primary students go from the Tatsuda Ryo to local secondary schools and high schools. Miyazaki said that the prevention of leprosy was a national policy. Children born of leprosy patients live in the Tatsuda Ryo in order not to infect children. The problem should be solved from the standpoint of equal right of education. In other parts of Japan, children born of leprosy patients were welcomed.

The opposition said that they heard the explanation from Dr. Miyazaki, but it was pressure from the law and science. They had heard that three persons had developed leprosy from the Tatsuda Ryo. In the case of Sakurayama High School, they admitted a student secretly. The president of the PTA said that enlightenment should come first; if the local inhabitants became convinced. Otherwise, the children cannot feel safe.

Meetings of both sides were frequently held in the small community. When the city education committee sent a letter allowing the children to go to school, three members of the opposition movement went on a hunger strike before the city education committee.

=== Mediation ===
The hunger strike continued over 155 hours when it was stopped by the mediation of Morio Takahashi, the President of the Kumamoto College of Commerce. He would take care of the questioned children (one boy and two girls) at his house and let them go to the school.

A commencement ceremony took place on April 18, 1955. The children went to school accompanied by a female teacher of another school. The incident appeared to be solved but the school had taken special precautions. The children were encircled by classmates of the pro-schooling movement and special attention was given to school lunch. Starting in the fall of 1955, the children of the Tatsuda Ryo were secretly sent to various institutions and homes and relatives. In October 1957, the Tatsuda Ryo was formally abolished.
