= Forced Hospitalization at Honmyōji =

Forced hospitalization of leprosy patients in Japan

Forced Hospitalization at Honmyōji Honmyōji incident
- Location: Kumamoto, Kumamoto Prefecture, Japan
- Date: July 9, 1940; Starting at 4 a.m.
- Target: Leprosy patients living near Honmyoji temple
- Attack type: Forced hospitalization of leprosy patients by policemen and staff of Kikuchi Keifuen Sanatorium
- Deaths: 0
- Victims: 157, mostly transferred to other sanatoriums

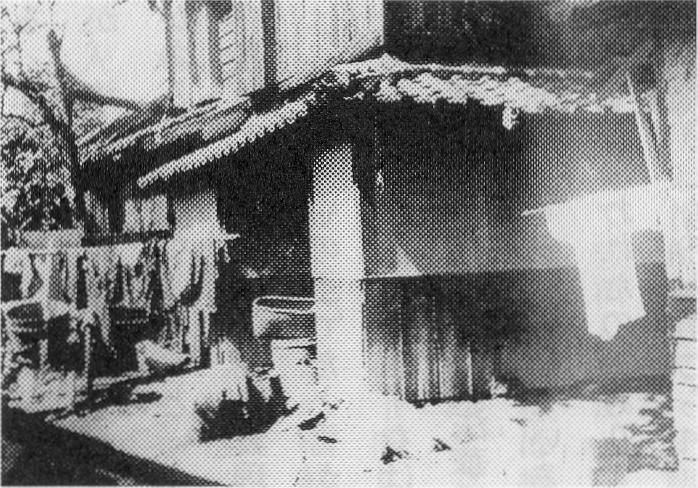
A photo of Hansen's disease colony in Honmyōji

Forced Hospitalization at Honmyōji, also called the Honmyōji incident, was the forced hospitalization of leprosy patients living near Honmyō-ji Temple, in the western suburbs of Kumamoto, Japan on July 9, 1940. It is regarded as an incident related to the "No Leprosy Patients in Our Prefecture Movement".

== Background ==
In the early part of the Meiji period, leprosy patients in Japan usually left their families, and lived near temples and shrines and begged for money, while some others lived around hot springs for treatment. The Honmyōji Temple area was a typical place of the former, while Kusatsu Hot Spring, Gunma Prefecture was that of the latter. The public leprosy policy was started in 1909 when 5 public leprosy sanatoriums opened in Japan. However, the early policy was to hospitalize wandering patients only. Around 1930, there occurred the "No Leprosy Patients in Our Prefecture Movement" and the Government intended to hospitalize all leprosy patients in sanatoriums.

There were four communities of leprosy patients around the Honmyōji Temple, which was a temple of the Nichiren Sect of Buddhism; "leprosy may result if a patient's faith was not enough", according to their sutra. Therefore, many leprosy patients gathered around the temple and prayed for improvement.

== Within the settlements ==
More than 10% of people living there developed leprosy, but they lived peacefully with normal persons without trouble. However, some of them organized a secret society which demanded unlawful contributions for leprosy care throughout the country, namely by way of threat of infecting other people. This was made an excuse of the forced hospitalization.

== Forced hospitalization ==
In 1927, the Japanese government began to discuss the dissolution of gathering places of leprosy patients. Mamoru Uchida and Soichiro Shiotani studied the conditions of the communities of the Honmyōji Temples. 6 patients wanted to enter Kyushu Sanatorium, but the director Matsuki Miyazaki did not accept them. So, they brought the patients to Nagashima Aiseien and serious discussions started including Kensuke Mitsuda. The directors of sanatoriums formally discussed the dissolution of leprosy communities. Yamada, the director of the Kumamoto Prefecture Police Department, took the leadership and 157 patients were hospitalized by 220 people, including the policemen and workers of the Kikuchi Keifuen Sanatorium.

== The 157 persons ==
The 157 persons included 28 children of leprosy patients (children who did not develop leprosy), and 11 non-leprosy persons. With the exception of 8 patients with severe leprosy who were hospitalized in Kikuchi Keifuen Sanatorium, other patients were transferred to other sanatoriums: 26 to Nagashima Aiseien Sanatorium, 31 to Hoshizuka Keiaien Sanatorium, 44 to Oku Komyoen Sanatorium, and 36 Kuryu Rakusen-en Sanatorium. Especially, patients of the secret society were transferred to the Kusatsu Rakusen-en Sanatorium where there was a special prison, for punishment.

== Significance ==
It is generally agreed that this was an important incident in the No Leprosy Patients in Our Prefecture" movement which had started in 1930, although in Kyushu area, this movement had been very slow. Public opinions at that time were in favor of the movement, and purification of a prefecture at that time meant no leprosy patients in the prefecture. Mamoru Uchida pointed out that this incident was the will of the Government, and might be related to the coming war. The dispersion of patients to other sanatoriums is the sanatorium's strong will, that is, to severe all relations with the Honmyōji communities. The inclusion of 57 patients of the Kaishun Hospital, in February 1941, might have been planned.

== Criticisms ==
Minoru Narita criticizes the forced hospitalization at Honmyōji, citing an article concerning recent exclusion of homeless people. "Enterprises at Shinjuku Nishiguchi, at the heart of Tokyo started the rejection of homeless people on the ground of bad smell and hindrance of activities of enterprises and hindrance of public peace and order. Narita states that the forced hospitalization was the same in contents, differing in the viewpoints. These incidents ignored the will of leprosy patients, or of homeless people, and the social problems leading to these incidents. The justifications of the forced hospitalization included the prevention of leprosy, and the peace of people living there.
