= Hakaru Miyagawa =

Japanese hospital administrator

- Born: January 26, 1905; Takayama, Gifu Prefecture
- Died: September 3, 1949 (aged 44)
- Occupation: Manager of leper hospitals
- Known for: Studies on the history of leprosy in Japan

Hakaru Miyagawa (宮川 量, Miyagawa Hakaru; January 26, 1905 – September 3, 1949) worked at Tama Zenshoen Sanatorium, Nagashima Aiseien Sanatorium, Okinawa Airakuen Sanatorium, Hoshizuka Keiaien Sanatorium and studied the history of leprosy.

== Life ==
He was born at a Buddhist temple on January 26, 1905, in Takayama, Gifu Prefecture. He became a Christian later. After graduation from Chiba Prefectural Horticulture School, he worked at Zensho Hospital. He later went to Nagashima Aiseien Sanatorium following Kensuke Mitsuda. In 1938, he was appointed the first manager of Okinawa Airakuen Sanatorium. In 1941, he worked at Hoshizuka Keiaien Sanatorium and later at Nagashima Aiseien Sanatorium. On September 3, 1949, he died.

== Greening and manager ==
As a graduate of Chiba Horticulture School, he worked for the greening of the hospitals, and it was said that all trees at Nagashima Aiseien Sanatorium were transplanted except pine trees. At the Zenshoen Hospital, he was one of the five active men, following Fumio Hayashi, Einosuke Shionuma, Isamu Tajiri and Kouzou Fujita. He was appointed the first manager of Okinawa Airakuen Sanatorium and started with digging wells.

== Works on the history of leprosy in Japan ==
- History of salvation of leprosy patients in Japan
- Materials of salvation of leprosy
- About the legend of Empress Kōmyō who sucked the pus of a leper
- Kukai(771-835) and leprosy
- The story of chaulmoogra oil
- A visit to the home of Heibei Okamura
- Ninsei Risshi, a priest of salvation of leprosy patients
- Nishiyama Komyoin, the last medieval leprosy house
- A visit to Okinawa and Taiwan leprosy conditions
- Leprosy in Kuan Tung Province, China.
- Korean leprosy conditions was his record of visit he went with Kensuke Mitsuda.

== The Medical Certificate of the last woman with leprosy at Nishiyama Komyoin ==
- Miyagawa recorded valuable medieval leprosy records, among which was a medical certificate of Nishiyama Naka (not real name) at age 37 on November 1, 1881, by Misao Kusuda.
  - Medical Certificate. Nishiyama Naka, age 37. Constitution: medium. Cause: unknown. Diagnosis: Lepra(例布羅). Symptoms: Extremities were paralyzed. Muscles and Joints; Bleeding and Pustulating. Coughing was severe. Course:10 years. Treatment: none. Prognosis: poor. Diagnosing Doctor:Misao Kusuda.
  - She was born to a rich man in Yamato-Takaichi-gun, and possessed land. She died in 1916 as the last inhabitant of the Nishiyama Komyoin.
