= Nami Matsuda =

Japanese physician

- Born: 1904; Yatsushiro, Kumamoto Prefecture, Japan
- Died: 1995 (aged 90–91)
- Occupation: Physician specialing in leprosy
- Known for: Chief doctor at Okinawa Airakuen Sanatorium who survived air raids

Nami Matsuda (松田 ナミ, Matsuda Nami; 1904 – November 14, 1995) was a Christian Japanese female physician who worked at Kikuchi Keifuen Sanatorium, Okinawa Airakuen Sanatorium and Hoshizuka Keiaien Sanatorium. In 1945, she was the head doctor under the director and survived extreme hardships with 7 nurses including chief nurse Chiyo Mikami at Okinawa Airakuen Sanatorium.

== Life ==
In 1904, she was born in Yatsushiro city, Kumamoto Prefecture and entered Tokyo Women's Medical University in 1923. In 1926, she was baptized. She entered the Bible class with Fumiko Ohnishi and Chika Nawa who later became female physicians at Hansen's disease sanatoriums. In 1935, she worked at Kikuchi Keifuen Sanatorium under Matsuki Miyazaki and in 1938 she went to Okinawa Airakuen Sanatorium without the permission of Matsuki Miyazaki.

=== 1945 ===
In 1945, the war conditions worsened day by day. They dug air-raid shelters into the hard rocks and disabled patients had to live in the underground air-raid shelters. She was ordered to discard personal things and discarded her precious albums and waited for the last day. Three male workers of the Medical Section were drafted, never to return. There were 7 angels in white clothes, like 7 samurais in the battlefield, pursued their duties to the last. Between air-attacks, they went from one air-raid shelter to another. The sound of bombing made them crouch over patients, or rush to another shelter. The blackness of no-warning periods embraced the angels. She wrote the placing themselves in the extreme situations when they might be killed in another day, they felt the joy of surviving, a fact of unexplainable contradiction. "

=== Later life ===
In 1969, she worked at Hoshizuka Keiaien Sanatorium and died on November 14, 1995.

== Papers ==
- The histamine skin reaction in leprosy(1943). Okinawa Igakkai Zasshi, Vol.6
- Menstruation and neonates in Airakuen(1944). 18th Leprosy Congress(Kusatsu).
- Leprosy in Okinawa after the war(1948). Repura 18.1.

== Photographs ==
- At Okinawa Prefectural Archive, there were some photographs taken by the American troops.
