= Heibei Okamura =

Japanese chaulmoogra oil producer (1852–1934)

- Born: 1852; Osaka, Japan
- Died: 1934 (aged 81–82)
- Occupation: Oil producer (previously of clove oil)
- Known for: Production of good quality choaulmoogra oil, a traditional medicine for leprosy patients and caring more than 1000 leprosy patients in his house at Sakai, Osaka

Heibei Okamura (1852–1934) produced "Okamura's" chaulmoogra oil, between about 1892 and 1944 at Sakai, Osaka, Japan. Chaulmoogra oil, which is taken from capsular fruits of Hydnocarpus genus trees of Thailand, Indonesia, Malaysia and the Philippines, had been the only one remedy in wide use before Guy Henry Faget proved the efficacy of promin in 1943 Promin started the era of sulfon chemicals and revolutionalized the treatment of leprosy. Okamura was also known for caring for more than 1,000 leprosy patients between 1888 and 1901 in his house.

== Life ==
Heibei Okamura was born in Osaka in 1852, and his father went into the Okamura family. He married a girl of the Okamura family named Koteru. He was known in his city, Sakai, Osaka for being an amateur sumo wrestler, a tall height of 188 cm and for being a Japanese sword master. In 1888, he happened to save a miserable person with leprosy; he gave the patient a wash in a bathtub. Between 1888 and 1901, he cared for more than 1,000 leprosy patients in his house. He studied Chinese medicine and began to produce chaulmoogra oil probably in 1892, which was the year of the first advertisement. In 1944, the import of the materials of the oil discontinued, and the chaulmoogra oil age came to an end.

== Clove oil ==
The Okamura family had the technique of oil production, and since 1672, clove oil had been produced in the Okamura family. Clove oil had a variety of uses from Chinese medicine to the keeping of Japanese swords in good condition. Since the Meiji Restoration, the popularity of clove oil decreased, and the production of chaulmoogra oil was a prospective venture.

== Chaulmoogra oil ==
In a medical journal published in 1892, the first advertisement of Okamura's chaulmoogra oil was found. It was registered in Japanese Pharmacopoeia. Chaulmoogra oil was produced later by Ministry of Welfare, but the quality of the oil was inferior to Okamura's oil. The efficacy of chaulmoogra oil for leprosy was studied in a special lecture in 1940 by Yutaka Kamikawa; it differed depending on sanatoriums from 30% to 80% and there were many recurrences. However, before promin was discovered in 1943 by Guy Henry Faget, chaulmoogra oil had been the only remedy known to be effective in this disease.
