= Hiroshi Shima =

- Born: 23 July 1918; Kagawa Prefecture, Japan
- Died: 22 March 2003 (aged 84)
- Occupations: Writer and editor of a private journal Kazan Chitai
- Writing career
- Genres: novels, short stories
- Notable works: Katai(leprosy) karano kaihou(Freedom from leprosy), Raisha no Koe(the voice of leprosy patients), The leprosy prevention law should be amended
- Literary movement: started a movement on the unconstitutionality of the leprosy prevention law

Hiroshi Shima (島 比呂志, 1918–2003, real name Kaoru Kishiue,岸上 薫) was a Japanese novelist, Hansen's disease patient and the chief editor of a literary coterie journal Kazan Chitai (Lava belt). He is famous for his letter which prompted a lawsuit resulting in compensation on account of the unconstitutionality of the Japanese leprosy prevention law.

== Name in leprosy sanatoriums ==
Because of the presence of leprosy stigma, patients in leprosy sanatoriums usually used names other than real names. This was prevalent not only in Japan, but also in America.

== Personal history ==
On July 23, 1918, Hiroshi Shima was born in Kagawa Prefecture. After becoming an assistant professor at Tokyo Norin Senmon Gakko Tokyo University of Agriculture and Technology, he developed leprosy and entered Ooshima Seishoen Sanatorium in 1947, and Hoshizuka Keiaien Sanatorium, Kagoshima Prefecture in 1948. In 1958, he started a literary journal Kazan Chitai (lava belt) of which he was the owner-editor. In June 1990, he received a letter from a patient "why are leprosy patients not angry", concerning the unfair treatment of leprosy patients under the Japanese leprosy prevention law. In July 1997, he wrote a letter to lawyer Ikenaga, which led to the compensation lawsuit due to the unconstitutionality of the Japanese leprosy prevention law. On June 20, 1999, he left the Hoshizuka Keiaien Sanatorium and re-entered normal society. He died on March 22, 2003.

== Hoshizuka Keiaien Sanatorium ==
His literary ability was already known, and he was given the post of patients' association staff in charge of a journal. He was involved in various troubles within the sanatorium. One of his friends commented that he was very good at collecting money, concerning his journal.

== Works ==
- Short novels in the 'Collection of leprosy literature, Vol. 3,'
  - Ringo(apple),Kimyona-kuni(A strange country), Nagata Shunsaku,Karo no Ichi(The place of a cat), Homan Chuui, Seizon sengen,
  - Tamate-bako, Umino suna.
- Ikite Areba Kodansha, 1957.
- Katai(leprosy) karano kaihou(Freedom from leprosy) Shakai Hyoronsha, 1985.
- Seizon Sengen, Shakai Hyoronsha, 1996.
- Raisha no Koe(the voice of leprosy patients) , Shakai Hyoronsha, 1988.
- The leprosy prevention law should be amended. Iwanami Booklet, 1991.
- The leprosy prevention law and the human rights of leprosy patients. Shakai Hyoronsha, 1993.

== Comments on his novels ==
- By Otohiko Kaga
  - He is very good at creating novels related to leprosy and I cannot but admit his ability of creating novels. Time has changed from the days of Hojou Tamio, a noted leprosy patient-novelist when leprosy was regarded incurable and there were unchangeable circumstances such as "it cannot be helped", and the days of Shima when leprosy can be cured with chemotherapy and doors were opening from the sanatoriums. There is surely his reason for existing, in his writing novels of his own, in view of the changing situation concerning leprosy.
