= Tada =

Tada or TADA may refer to:

== Places ==
- Tada, Tirupati district, a village in Andhra Pradesh, India
- Tada mandal, in Tirupati district, Andhra Pradesh, India
- Tada railway station, in Tada, Andhra Pradesh
- Tada Shrine, in Kawanishi, Hyōgo, Japan
- Tada Station (disambiguation)
- Tada, Madhya Pradesh, a village near the source of the Sunar River in India

== Music ==
- Ta-Dah, a 2006 album by Scissor Sisters
- "Ta Da", a 2000 song by Lil' Mo

== Other uses ==
- Tada (name), Japanese surname and given name
- Taking and driving away
- Terrorist and Disruptive Activities (Prevention) Act, a repealed anti-terrorism law in India
