= No Leprosy Patients in Our Prefecture Movement =

The Muraiken Undō (無癩県運動, Muraiken Undō), or No Leprosy Patients in Our Prefecture Movement, was a government funded Japanese public health and social movement which began between 1929 and 1934. Its mission was to systematically eliminate leprosy, (Hansen's disease), a readily transmissible, previously incurable, chronic infectious disease caused by M. leprae, from each prefecture in Japan. This was to be achieved by caring for those affected by the disease in government funded sanatoriums.

== Origin ==
In 1927, the Japanese government planned the dissolution of leprosy communities (leper colonies). The district welfare officers of Aichi Prefecture, Mamoru Uchida and Soichiro Shiotani, studied the conditions of the communities of the Honmyoji Temple in Kumamoto Prefecture. Six patients wished to enter the Kyushu Sanatorium, (later Kikuchi Keifuen Sanatorium). However, they were refused by Matsuki Miyazaki, the director of the sanatorium. Uchida and Shiotani brought the patients to Kensuke Mitsuda at the Nagashima Aiseien Sanatorium. Together, the welfare officers and Mitsuda initiated the movement. In 1931, the concept was made law. In the same year, the Empress Teimei founded the Leprosy Prevention Association. Eiichi Shibusawa was its president. The birthday of the empress, around 25 June, marked the beginning of an annual Leprosy Prevention Week. In 1952, at the time of the death of the empress, the name of the Leprosy Prevention Association was changed to Tofu Kyokai.

== The movement ==
The governor of each prefecture raised funds for the building of leprosy sanatoriums. The movement and its slogans, for example, "donate 10-tsubo houses (33.058 square meters) to sanatoriums", were publicised in newspapers, radio, film advertisements, and through religious groups, schools and other organisations. For example, a Jodo Shinshu school founded an association called Otani Komyokai to popularise the movement. Patients were forcibly hospitalised.

== Public response ==
Public interest in the movement varied between prefectures and over time. The people of Tottori Prefecture were most supportive of the movement. Kiyotatsu Tatsuda, the governor of Tottori prefecture, raised funds for the movement, invited Mitsuda to give lectures about the movement and built six houses in the Airakuen sanatorium to accommodate leprosy patients from Tottori Prefecture. Fukuoka Prefecture, Yamaguchi Prefecture, Miyagi Prefecture, Toyama Prefecture, Okayama Prefecture, Saitama Prefecture, Aichi Prefecture and Mie Prefecture were also supportive.

== Problems ==
The forced hospitalisation increased the leprosy stigma of the patients, their families and their neighbourhoods. Some patients were transferred beyond their own neighbourhoods, increasing their isolation. The conditions in sanatoriums suffered from overcrowding. Food ran short. In 1936, riots occurred and some patients escaped.

== Masako Ogawa ==
Masako Ogawa was a Japanese physician who worked at the Nagashima Aiseien sanatorium. In 1938, she wrote the book, Spring in a Small Island which later became a film. She wrote of her experiences in persuading people with leprosy in remote areas to be hospitalised. Some criticised Ogawa for accelerating the "No leprosy patients in our prefecture" movement and giving an impression that leprosy was to be feared.

== Second movement ==
On 31 December 1947, the Japanese government's Ministry of Interior Affairs, which had been responsible leprosy control, was abolished. After World War II, welfare officers were less involved because their role had induced stigma. Responsibility for control of leprosy was transferred to the prefectures. The names of patients previously reported to the head of police stations were reported to governors of prefectures. In November 1947, the Ministry of Welfare commented on the "No leprosy patients in our prefecture" movement. It stated that the elimination of leprosy was important for the building of a cultural state, and therefore, should be accomplished. Hospitalization should be commenced with the most contagious patients. In 1949, the government advised that training courses for physicians and technicians should begin; physical examination of all citizens should occur and patients should be hospitalised, even on rumour. In 1952, Matsuo Fujimoto, an hospitalised leprosy patient from Kumamoto, was tried, found guilty and executed for murder. His execution was contentious because some people felt he was being unfairly treated because he was a leper. By 1955, the government bodies responsible for control of leprosy included the ministry of welfare; the prefectures; the departments of public health and medicine; the section of tuberculosis prevention and the national sanatoria. Working for the movement were medical schools and physicians, news media, women's groups, schools and religious groups. Physicians who lectured for the movement included Kensuke Mitsuda, Fumio Hayashi (doctor), Isamu Tajiri and Mamoru Uchida.

== Statistics ==
Statistics of patients in 1955 and at the end of 1940
Prefecture	Patients not hospitalized at the end of 1954	Increase during 1955	Decrease	Patients not hospitalized at the end of 1955	Patients not hospitalized at the end of 1940
Hokkaido	5	7	6	6	23
Aomori	31	4	8	27	220
Iwate	42	3	12	33	66
Miyagi	18	7	6	19	7
Akita	43	6	5	44	119
Yamagata	23	5	13	15	63
Fukushima	17	7	8	16	80
Ibaragi	4	8	11	1	53
Tochigi	14	2	14	2	63
Gunma	2	7	5	4	393
Saitama	5	9	11	2	19
Chiba	15	2	12	5	14
Tokyo	9	29	29	9	112
Kanagawa川	0	11	9	2	50
Niigata	16	1	5	12	53
Toyama	7	4	6	5	22
Ishikawa	14	2	4	12	41
Fukui	16	9	9	16	50
Yamanashi	3	5	6	2	39
Nagano	1	2	1	2	54
Gifu	27	6	6	27	161
Shizuoka	7	13	15	5	120
Aichi	87	26	49	65	356
Mie	73	25	35	63	106
Shiga	9	8	7	10	86
Kyoto	29	14	12	31	64
Osaka	78	38	33	83	337
Hyogo	92	27	42	77	242
Nara	8	12	12	8	67
Wakayama	13	3	7	9	91
Tottori	22	2	7	17	41
Shimane	18	5	6	17	96
Okayama	16	5	7	14	32
Hiroshima	26	11	9	28	58
Yamaguchi	12	10	12	10	10
Tokushima	30	8	8	30	77
Kagawa	15	8	10	13	121
Ehime	13	18	17	14	84
Kochi	6	23	15	14	175
Fukuoka	19	23	24	18	97
Saga	7	8	8	7	90
Nagasaki	62	14	38	38	172
Kumamoto	121	26	53	94	629
Oita	46	8	14	40	114
Miyazaki	50	11	22	39	278
Kagoshima	195	18	105	108	567
Okinawa	?(Under US control)	?(Under US control)	?(Under US control)	?(Under US control)	761
Total	1,366	500	753	1,113	6573

== Apologies ==
The following apology was issued by the Ohtani Sect of Jōdo Shinshu Buddhism:

The 1931 leprosy prevention law of Japan aimed at the segregation of leprosy patients for the safety of healthy individuals. Later, the necessity of segregation was negated scientifically. With several amendments of the law, the leprosy prevention law was finally outlawed through longtime endeavors of the national Hansen's disease patients councils. In the first place, it is to be stressed that the law aimed at the segregation of leprosy patients, at the erasure of leprosy patients from the society to create a safe society of healthy people. This planted an erroneous concept that people with leprosy were dangerous people requiring segregation and justifying segregation. In 1931, our Otani section started an Ohtani Komyokai in order to advance the no leprosy in our prefecture movement in accord with Kensuke Mitsuda, without hearing the opinion of Noboru Ogasawara. We could not recognize the significance of segregatory policy of leprosy which committed an outrage upon human rights. We did comfort sermons to patients, but the sermons might be only helpful in persuading them to accept the present situation, namely, segregation. Now we have to accept criticisms and have to repent of our sins. We apologize to patients with leprosy and their families who had endured the sufferings of segregation for committing our failure.

In 2001, when the leprosy prevention law was ruled unconstitutional, the Prime Minister, the Minister of Welfare, and the National Diet published statements of apology to leprosy patients and their families. Several prefectural governors made apologies at public sanatoriums.

== Compensation ==
In 2001, compensation to patients hospitalised between 1960 and 1998 was legislated. The compensation varied between 8,000,000 yen to 14,000,000 yen per person.

== See also ==
- NIMBY
