= Spring on Leper's Island =

1940 Japanese film

Spring on Leper’s Island
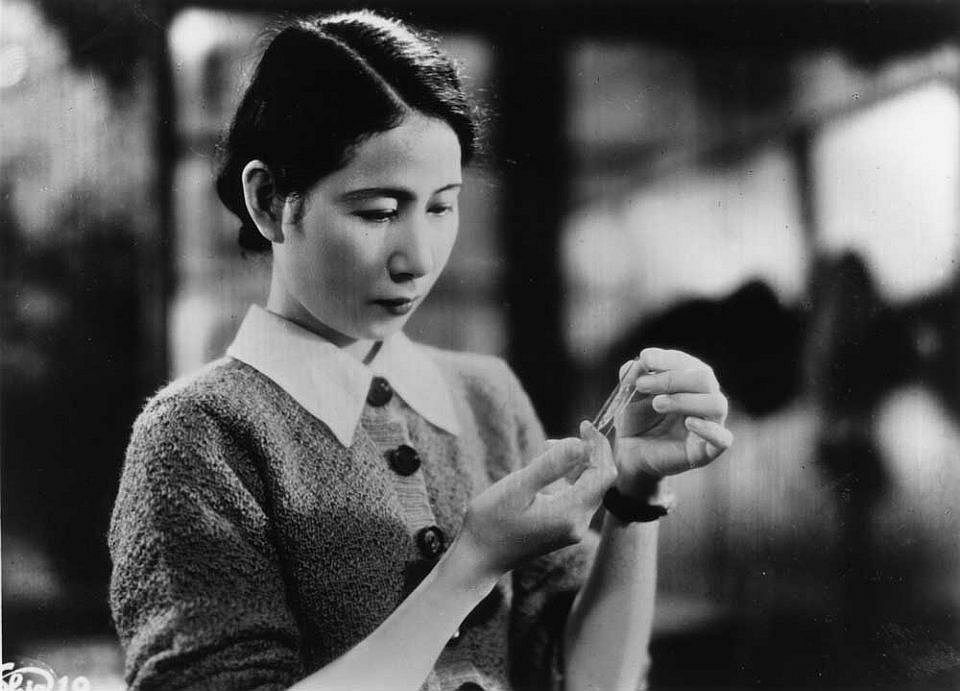

Japanese name
- Kanji: 小島の春
- Directed by: Shirō Toyoda
- Written by: Yasutarō Yagi; Masako Ogawa (book)
- Produced by: Shigemune Kazunobu
- Starring: Shizue Natsukawa; Ichirō Sugai; Haruko Sugimura; Yuriko Hanabusa
- Cinematography: Kinya Ogura
- Music by: Shūichi Tsugawa
- Production company: Tokyo Hassei Eiga
- Distributed by: Toho
- Release date: 31 July 1940 (Japan)
- Running time: 88 minutes
- Country: Japan
- Language: Japanese

Spring on Leper's Island (Japanese: 小島の春, romanized: Kojima no haru, lit. 'Spring on a Small Island') is a 1940 Japanese drama film directed by Shirō Toyoda. It is based on the memoir of Masako Ogawa, a Japanese doctor who specialised in leprosy treatment, and is noted by film historians for its humanist and compassionate theme in contrast to the militarist national film policy at the time.

== Plot ==
Mrs. Koyama, a young female doctor working at the Nagashima Aiseien Sanatorium, travels the islands of the Seto Inland Sea to talk leprosy patients into moving to the sanatorium where they can be treated and live together with other people affected by the disease. Many patients and their relatives are reluctant to the move; while family father Yokogawa is still trying to work to support his wife and children, others are hiding in their family's homes or in deserted shacks. In the end, Yokogawa gives in to the doctor's advice and follows her to the sanatorium. His saddened and angered son Kenzo watches his departure by boat from the island's harbour.

== Cast ==
- Shizue Natsukawa as Mrs. Koyama
- Ichirō Sugai as Yokogawa
- Haruko Sugimura as Yokogawa's wife
- Yōtarō Katsumi as mayor
- Kan Hayashi as Horiguchi
- Yuriko Hanabusa as Horiguchi's wife
- Fudeko Tanaka as landlady
- Meiko Nakamura as Kiyoko
- Ken Mitsuda as Miyata
- Misako Shimizu as Toshi
- Shiro Mizutani as Kenzo

== Historical background ==
Spring on Leper’s Island was compliant with Japan's public health policy and its Leprosy Prevention Laws (last widened in 1931), which saw the increasing segregation of leprosy patients from their communities, a growing number of sanatoria where they were hospitalised, and the launching of the No Leprosy Patients in Our Prefecture (muraiken undō) campaign which Ogawa advocated. The film received a recommendation by Japan's Ministry Of Education.

== Awards ==
- 1941 Kinema Junpo Award for Best Film of the Year
