= Shunzō =

- Gender: Male

Origin
- Origin: Japanese
- Meaning: Different meanings depending on the kanji used

Shunzō, Shunzo or Shunzou (written: 春三 or 俊三) is a masculine Japanese given name. Notable people with the name include:

- Shunzo Ono (大野 俊三; born 1965), Japanese footballer
- Shunzo Sugimura (杉村 春三; 1910–1994), Japanese writer
- Yamada Shunzō (山田 春三; 1846–1921), Japanese politician
