= Lin Wenxiong =

Lin Wenxiong (林文雄) may refer to:

- Lin Wenxiong, a character in Singaporean television series Double Happiness
- Lin Wen-heung, a character in Taiwanese film A City of Sadness
- Lin Wen-hsiung (born 1942), Taiwanese Kuomintang politician in Tainan, Mayor of Tainan (1985–1989)
- Fumio Hayashi (1900–1947), Japanese physician and leprologist
