= Kageyoshi Tada =

Japanese physician

- 多田 景義
- Died: 1950
- Occupations: Physician, director of Miyako Nanseien Sanatorium (1935 - 1945)

Kageyoshi Tada (多田 景義, Tada Kageyoshi; died 1950) was a Japanese physician who worked in Miyako Nanseien Sanatorium, Okinawa Prefecture, Japan, between 1938 and 1945. He put in-patients who were forcibly hospitalized under strict control; a special facility was built with barbed wire fences and in-patients were not allowed to leave. In 1945, 110 in-patients died of malaria, malnutrition, and as direct effects of air attacks, while his group escaped to the army shelter.

== Life ==
In 1915, he graduated from Kumamoto Medical School, and he was appointed chief doctor in Ojikajima Koseien Sanatorium, Korea (National Sorok Hospital). In 1938 he was appointed the director of Miyako Nanseien Sanatorium. In 1948 he became a physician in Kikuchi Keifuen Sanatorium.

== Miyako Nanseien Sanatorium ==
Tada served as the director of the Miyako Nanseien Sanatorium during World War II. He intensified the strict segregation of patients through the construction of barbwired fences, and the building of a special prison. At that time, two nurses performed a vasectomy and an artificial abortion, with no records of him performing either operation. Tada declared that the mark of a red cross would prevent air-raids, but the sanatorium was destroyed by air-raids. Since the houses of the sanatorium workers were also destroyed, he and other leaders of the sanatorium escaped in a shelter of the army, while 110 in-patients died either of malaria, malnutrition, or as direct effect of air-raids in 1945. After the war, he worked in Kikuchi Keifuen Sanatorium between 1947 and 1950. He died in 1950.
