= Chiyo Mikami =

Japanese nurse

- Born: 1891
- Died: 1978 (aged 86–87)
- Occupation: Nurse
- Known for: Devotion to leprosy patients at various hospitals, for which she was given Florence Nightingale Medal in 1957. In Okinawa Airakuen Sanatorium, she survived an air raid in 1945

Chiyo Mikami (三上千代 1891–1978) was a Japanese nurse, who worked for leprosy patients and was given the Florence Nightingale Medal in 1957. She helped Cornwall Legh at St. Barnaba Hospital at Kusatsu, helped Kesa Hattori at Suzuran Hospital, started Suzuran-en Sanatorium, worked at an institution in Miyagi Prefecture, at Tama Zenshoen Sanatorium and at Kunigami Airakuen Sanatorium Okinawa Airakuen Sanatorium.

== Life ==
1891:She was born in Yamagata shi, Yamagata Prefecture. 1908:She entered a Bible school. 1910: She first met two female leprosy patients when she was a missionary. 1912:She entered a nursing school attached to Mitsui Jizen Byoin. 1915:Qualified as a nurse. 1916:Nurse at Zensho Byoin. 1917:Dormitory superintendent at the House of Love, Barnaba Mission. nurse at the St. Barnaba Clinic. 1924:Started Suzuran Hospital with Dr. Kesa Hattori. Hattori died 23 days later. 1925:Became midwife at the suggestion of Kensuke Mitsuda. 1926:Started Suzuran Sanatorium at Takishiribaru, Kusatsu. (Yearend statistics showed the maximum in-patients, 22.) 1931-1933: Started a home for the children of leprosy patients in Miyagi Prefecture (2nd Suzuran En.) 1933:Nurse at Zensho Byoin Tama Zenshoen Sanatorium. 1938:Head nurse at Kunigami Airakuen Sanatorium Okinawa Airakuen Sanatorium 1947:Nurse at Tama Zenshoen Sanatorium 1954:Retired from above 1957:Received the Florence Nightingale Medal. 1978:Died on July 18.

== Determination ==
At age 18, she visited two ladies with severe leprosy when she was a missionary. Then she attended a school and was qualified as a nurse. She told the director of the school her intention of working for leprosy patients. The director introduced her to Kensuke Mitsuda. When she was working at Tama Zenshoen Sanatorium, a missionary informed her that a nurse was wanted by Cornwall Legh at Kusatsu and she immediately applied for it. She became the superintendent of the House of Love, within the St. Barnaba Mission.

== At Kusatsu ==
Mikami suggested that a clinic be made and asked Dr. Hattori to help. They started " St. Barnaba Clinic" on Nov. 3, 1917 within the Barnaba Mission. They established "Suzuran Clinic" in Nov. 1923, but Dr. Hattori died soon afterwards. With the help of Kensuke Mitsuda and others, she started Suzuran Sanatorium. For patients, she started boring for possible hot spring, but this invited the anger of Kusatsu Hot Spring people. She met Kensuke Mitsuda and Eiichi Subusawa and a policy of a national sanatorium started. She admitted the nationalization of her sanatorium.

== The 2nd Suzuran En ==
Between 1931 and 1933, she made a home for leprosy patient children in Miyagi Prefecture.

== Okinawa ==
After working at Tama Zenshoen Sanatorium, in 1933, in 1938, she was named the top nurse at newly built Kunigami Airakuen Sanatorium which became later Okinawa Airakuen Sanatorium.

- Dr. Nami Matsuda described the following.
  - Crazy Women. There were 7 angels in whites, like 7 samurais in the battlefield, pursued their duties to the last. They were chief nurse Mikami, Nishizaki, Masuda, Chinen, Kabira, Yoshihama, and Gakiya. Between air-raids, they went from one air-raid shelter to another. The sound of bombing made them crouch over patients, or rush to another shelter. The blackness of no-warning periods embraced the angels. Placing themselves in the extreme situations when they might be killed in another day, they felt the joy of surviving, a fact of unexplainable contradiction."
