= Shunzo Sugimura =

Shunzō Sugimura
- Born: 1910; Hakodate, Hokkaido
- Died: 1994 (aged 83–84)
- Occupations: Secretary of a leprosy sanatorium in Manchuria(1944-1945) and Director of the Riddell-Wright Memorial Home(1959-1980)
- Known for: Leprosy and Social welfare(1966)

Shunzō Sugimura (杉村春三 1910–1994) wrote his lifework "leprosy and social welfare" through fieldwork. He worked at Hoshizuka Keiaien Sanatorium, Manchuria Doukouin Sanatorium and Riddell-Wright Memorial Home for the Aged.

== Life ==
- 1910: He was born in Hakodate, Hokkaido.
- 1932: He discontinued attending Kyushu University because of tuberculosis.
- 1940: He worked at Hoshizuka Keiaien Sanatorium.
- 1942: He was given navy-related work.
- 1944: He assumed the post of the secretary at Manchuria Leprosy Sanatorium Doukouin.
- 1945: He left the Doukouin Sanatorium in August, 1945.
- 1947: Part-timer at the leprosy prevention association.
- 1951-1959: Director of the Riddell-Wright Memorial Home for the Aged.
- 1959-1980: Director of the Jiaien Home for the Aged.
- 1994: He died.

== His lifework "Leprosy and social welfare" ==
- He had continued to write this series of studies between 1951 and 1958 in a journal "Keifuh" of Kikuchi Keifuen Sanatorium. He discontinued writing it due to outside pressure. He characterized the leprosy policy in Japan as "Leprosarium-ism", or "leprosarium-centered" and claimed straightforwardly that this is a great mistake. Through fieldwork, he analyzed how leprosy stigma is bred, and why social rehabilitation cannot succeed. There are two editions of his book, compiled in 1986 and 2007, the latter of which had more than 580 pages.

== Manchuria Leprosy Sanatorium Doukouin ==
- In 1939, Manchuria State Leprosy Sanatorium Doukouin was established in 1939 and Masashi Namba assumed the post of the second director in January 1940. "It was situated remotely 50 km from Tetsurei. The patients numbered 31, (1 Japanese, 10 Chinese and 20 Koreans). In 1944, patients increased to 117. At the order of Manchuria Army, Sugimura returned to Tetsurei with his wife and baby, and there was a tragic end of the sanatorium. At great risk, he visited the sanatorium on two occasions and found the sanatorium had become completely ruined and one Japanese boy patient had committed suicide.
