= Kamikawa =

Kamikawa may refer to:

== People ==
- Aya Kamikawa (上川 あや; born 1968), Japanese municipal official
- Akihiko Kamikawa (神川 明彦; born 1966), Japanese football player and manager
- Daiki Kamikawa (上川 大樹; born 1989), Japanese judoka
- Takaya Kamikawa (上川 隆也; born 1965), Japanese stage, film, and television actor
- Toru Kamikawa (上川 徹; born 1963), Japanese football (soccer) referee
- Yōko Kamikawa (上川 陽子; born 1953), Japanese politician and former think tank researcher
- Yutaka Kamikawa (上川 豊; 1892–2001), Japanese physician

== Places ==
- Kamikawa Subprefecture, one of 14 subprefectures in Hokkaidō
  - Kamikawa (Ishikari) District, Hokkaidō, a district in Kamikawa Subprefecture
    - Kamikawa, Hokkaidō, a town in Kamikawa (Ishikari) District, Kamikawa Subprefecture, Hokkaidō
      - Kamikawa Station, a railway station in Kamikawa, Hokkaidō Prefecture
  - Kamikawa (Teshio) District, Hokkaidō, a district in Kamikawa Subprefecture
- Kamikawa (Tokachi) District, Hokkaidō, a district in Tokachi Subprefecture
- Kamikawa, Hyōgo, a town in Hyōgo Prefecture
- Kamikawa, Niigata, a village in Niigata Prefecture
- Kamikawa, Saitama, a town in Saitama Prefecture

== See also ==
- Japanese seaplane tender Kamikawa Maru
- Kamikawa Maru-class seaplane tender
