= Hakaru =

- Gender: Male

Origin
- Origin: Japanese
- Meaning: Different meanings depending on the kanji used

Hakaru (written: 策 or 量) is a masculine Japanese given name. Notable people with this name include:

- Hakaru Hashimoto (橋本 策; 1881–1934), Japanese physician
- Hakaru Masumoto (増本 量; 1895–1987), Japanese metallurgist
- Hakaru Miyagawa (宮川 量; 1905–1949), Japanese leper hospital manager

== See also ==
- Hakaru River, a river in New Zealand
