= Tachie =

Tachie may refer to:

- Desmond Tachie (born 1984), Ghanaian-Canadian soccer player
- Tachie, British Columbia, Canada

== See also ==
- Tachi (disambiguation)
- Tachie-Mensah
