= Taiji =

Taiji, tai chi, or t'ai chi (太極; 太极) may refer to:

- Tai chi, an internal Chinese martial art practiced for self-defense and health
- Taiji (philosophy), a concept in Daoist philosophy
- Taegeuk, a Korean symbol based on the philosophical concept

== Entertainment ==
- Tai Chi (band), a Hong Kong rock band
- Tai Chi (TVB), the television series broadcast by TVB

== History ==
- Taiji (Mongol title), a 16th-century title of nobility
- Taiji, the era of the rule of Emperor Ruizong of Tang

== People ==
- Hong Taiji (1592–1643) or Hung T'ai chi, an early Qing dynasty Manchu emperor
- Taiji (musician) (1966–2011) or Taiji Sawada, Japanese musician
- Taiji Arita (有田 泰而; 1941–2011), Japanese commercial photographer
- Taiji Ishimori (石森 太二; born 1983), Japanese professional wrestler
- Taiji Kase (加瀬 泰治; 1929–2004), Japanese master of Shotokan karate
- Taiji Matsue (松江 泰治; born 1963), Japanese photographer
- Taiji Nishitani (西谷 泰治; born 1981), Japanese former professional racing cyclist
- Taiji Nojima (野島 泰治; 1896–1970), Japanese dermatologist
- Taiji Tonoyama (殿山 泰司; 1915–1989), Japanese actor
- Wakasegawa Taiji (若瀬川 泰二; 1920–1993), sumo wrestler
- Taiji Yamaga (山鹿 泰治; 1892–1970), Japanese anarchist and Esperantist
- Seo Taiji (born 1972), South Korean musician

== Places ==
- Taiji Cave, religious site in China
- Taiji, Wakayama, a town in Japan

== Other ==
- Taiji Program in Space, a proposed Chinese satellite-based gravitational-wave observatory
- Taiji dolphin drive hunt, an annual dolphin hunt in Taiji, Wakayama

== See also ==
- Tai (disambiguation)
- Chi (disambiguation)
- Ji (disambiguation)
- Tachi (disambiguation)
- Taichi (name), a Japanese given name and surname
- Tao Chi (painter) (1641–1720), Ming Dynasty artist
