= Taiji Nojima =

Japanese dermatologist

- Born: November 10, 1896; Hiroshima Prefecture, Japan
- Died: March 3, 1970 (aged 73)
- Occupation: Physician
- Known for: The director of Ooshima Seishoen Sanatorium between 1934 and 1969, Overseas trip oa a leprosy doctor (1973), Studies on leprosy, papers in journals amounted to 144

Taiji Nojima (野島 泰治, Nojima Taiji; November 10, 1896 – March 3, 1970) was a Japanese dermatologist at Ooshima Seishoen Sanatorium for 41 years, including director for 36 years. He attended many international leprosy congresses and visited many overseas leprosy sanatoriums.

== History ==
Nojima was born in Hiroshima Prefecture in 1896, and graduated from Osaka Medical University (now Osaka University) in 1921. In 1923, he worked at Sotojima Hoyoin Sanatorium. In 1927, he worked at Ooshima Seishoen Sanatorium. In 1932, Nojima earned a Ph.D. for studies on the serum reactions in leprosy. In 1934, he became the director of Ooshima Seishoen Sanatorium. In 1937, he was the president of the 10th Congress of the Japanese Leprosy Association at Takamatsu. In 1956, Nojima attended a leprosy congress in Rome and reported on the leprosy situation in Japan. Subsequently, he visited many leprosy sanatoriums throughout the world, and reported his experiences through various means in Japan. Nojima retired in 1969, and died on March 3, 1970.

== Works ==
- Inoru- Overseas Trips of a Leposy Doctor 1973, Kyoto.
  - He visited various leprosy sanatoriums over the world, including Southeast Asia, Europe, North and South America, Philippines. The approval of the first trip to Europe by the Ministry of Welfare was very difficult and he had to travel at his own expense and by ship. The conditions of overseas leprosy sanatoriums were known through him who wrote many articles in a sanatorium journal.
- Essays - "Leprosy, Pickled ume(plum) and Military Policemen", 1971.
  - This was also a collection of his essays published in a sanatorium journal. The title came from his experiences at the end of the last war. Amid confusion of the end of the war, he was given a truck by the Navy and was using for the sanatorium, and was arrested by the Army and he was beaten up illegally.
- A collection of works by Dr. Taiji Nojima.
  - Papers read at congresses or published in journals amounted to 144. Throughout his life, he studied tuberculosis and leprosy; he claimed one theory that tuberculosis bacilli and the bacilli which cause leprosy are the same(ichigen-ron)

== Criticisms ==
Nojima criticized the opinions of Noboru Ogasawara at congresses. He was considered to be a member of the Kensuke Mitsuda school. In his essay, he recommended Kensuke Mitsuda for an Order of Cultural Merits.
