= Tachi (disambiguation) =

A tachi (太刀) is a type of Japanese curved sword.

Tachi may also refer to:

== People ==
- Tachi (surname), a Japanese surname
- Tachi (footballer) (Alberto Rodríguez Baró, born 1997), Spanish footballer
- A tribe of Native American Indians in California - see Yokuts and Santa Rosa Rancheria

== Other uses ==
- Tachi (大刀), Heian Era sword, a version of the chokutō (直刀), a Japanese straight sword
- A Japanese term for karate stances, varying body positions to attack and defend
- A suffix used in the Japanese language to indicate that a word refers to a group, see the article on Japanese grammar
- TOM'S (Tachi Oiwa Motor Sports), TOM'S Co., Ltd (株式会社トムス, Kabushiki-gaisha Tomusu), a factory supported racing team and tuner of Toyota and Lexus vehicles
- Tachi Yokuts, a native language spoken in California and a member of the Yokuts language group.

== See also ==
- Taichi
- Taiji (disambiguation)
