= Tada (name) =

Tada is a Japanese surname. It has also been used as a given name. Notable people with the name include:

== Surname ==
- Akifumi Tada (born 1964), Japanese anime music composer and video game composer
- Aoi Tada (born 1981), Japanese singer and voice actress
- Asami Tada (born 1988), Japanese gravure idol
- Chimako Tada (1930–2003), Japanese poet
- Daisuke Tada (born 1982), Japanese football goalkeeper
- Etsuko Tada (born 1989), Japanese professional boxer
- Hayao Tada (1882–1948), general in the Imperial Japanese Army in the Second Sino-Japanese War
- Hiroshi Tada (born 1929), Japanese aikido teacher
- Hiroshi Tada (performer), performer of a Japanese style of top spinning known as koma-mawashi
- Joni Eareckson Tada (born 1949) American, author, radio host, and evangelical Christian
- Kaoru Tada (1960–1999), Japanese manga artist
- Kageyoshi Tada (died 1950), Japanese physician
- Kenzo Tada (1889–a. 1930), Japanese dirt track motorcycle racer
- Tada Kasuke (died 1687), Japanese farmer and rebel
- Tada Mitsuyori (1501–1563), Japanese samurai of the Sengoku period
- Osamu Tada (多田 修, born 1935), Japanese alpine skier
- Ryosuke Tada (born 1992), Japanese football defender
- Seigo Tada (1922–1997), founder of Goju-Ryu Seigokan Karatedo
- Takayuki Tada (born 1988), Japanese football midfielder

== Given name ==
- Tada Keelalay (born 1984), Thai football defender
