= Masayuki Kawamura =

- Born: May 1, 1878; Fukuoka Prefecture, Japan
- Died: July 28, 1933 (aged 55)
- Occupation: Physician
- Known for: The first director of Kikuchi Keifuen Sanatorium (1909 -), Studies on leprosy

Masayuki Kawamura (河村 正之, Kawamura Masayuki; May 1, 1878 – July 28, 1933) was a Japanese physician who worked at Kikuchi Keifuen Sanatorium between 1909 and 1933. He was the first physician-director of the sanatorium which like other public sanitoriums would normally have been run by police officials from local stations.

== Life and work ==
Masayuki Kawamura was born in Fukuoka Prefecture on May 1, 1878. He graduated from Tokyo University and in 1909 he became the first director of Kikuchi Keifuen Sanatorium on the recommendation of Prof. Masanori Ogata of the department of Sanitary Sciences at Tokyo University. In 1926-7, he traveled to Fjerritslev in Denmark, visiting various places including a trip to the Bergen Sanatorium in Norway. He was awarded a Doctorate from Kumamoto University in 1932. He died suddenly of penetrating peritonitis during a visit to the Tsuetate hot spring in Kumamoto Prefecture on July 28, 1933.

== Papers and presentations ==
The following were by Masayuki Kawamura:

- "The use of Tetrodotoxin in leprosy" (1912). Kawamura M et al. Chizei Ikai Jiho, 141.
  - It was effective to some degree in neuralgic pain, but not effective in lepromatous leprosy.
- "On the leprosy settlement (Honmyoji buraku) in Kumamoto" (1933). Kawamura M, Uchida M, Shimose H. Repura 4,1,228.
  - Discussed were various problems such as why leprosy patients gathered there, on the ease of life of leprosy patients. Leprosy patients probably gathered in the Kyōhō years or 1716-1735.
- "On the treatment of leprosy as a social problem". Kawamura M, Uchida M. Repura. Kawamra M, et al. Repura, 4,1.
  - The biggest problem is that even if leprosy clears, the patient has not been treated normally by the presence of leprosy stigma. At present, a clinical complete cure is necessary.
- "Studies on murine leprosy: effects of chaulmoogra oil" (1932). 5th Leprosy Congress at Osaka.
- "Studies on murine leprosy: pathological differences from human leprosy" (1932). 5th Leprosy Congress at Osaka.
- "Studies on murine leprosy: relations between the amount of inoculated bacteria and lesions" (1932). 5th Leprosy Congress at Osaka.
- "Studies on murine leprosy: Mitsuda reaction" (1932). 5th Leprosy Congress at Osaka.

== Personal life ==
He was sincere and was popular among leprosy patients. He liked Waka (poetry), Haiku, Japanese calligraphy and drawing pictures and enjoyed waka and haiku with patients. When he died suddenly, patients composed many Bon Buddhist dance songs.
