= Keisai Aoki =

Japanese missionary (1893–1969)

- Born: April 8, 1893; Tokushima Prefecture, Japan
- Died: March 6, 1969 (aged 75)
- Occupation: Missionary
- Known for: Helping Okinawan leprosy patients, leading to the establishment of leper hospital Okinawa Airakuen Sanatorium

Keisai Aoki (青木恵哉, Aoki Keisai; April 8, 1893 – March 6, 1969) was a Japanese missionary who paved the way to the establishment of Hansen's disease (leprosy) sanatorium Kunigami-Airakuen, now Okinawa Airakuen Sanatorium, Okinawa.

At the age of 16, he developed leprosy and later, under the guidance of Hannah Riddell, he also helped many Okinawan people with leprosy in the Ryukyu Islands.

== Early history ==
Keisai Aoki was born Aoki Yasujirō, in Tokushima Prefecture, on April 8, 1893. At age 16, he was diagnosed with leprosy. To cure himself, he traveled to the 88 holy places of Shikoku.

In 1916, he entered the Oshima Leprosarium and in 1918, was baptized as a Christian. He helped with missionary work. While in Kusatsu, he met Englishwoman Hannah Riddell who was vacationing there, and decided to go work at the Kaishun Hospital where she was the director. He helped with her missionary work in the facility, which he described as having an almost monastic atmosphere.

During his time at the hospital, he met Tamaki Aiko, who he became attracted to. This, however, worried him because this was against Riddell's strict policy of gender segregation. He decided to leave the hospital to pursue missionary work in Okinawa at the strong suggestion of Riddell. It is not clear whether Riddell discovered Keisai's affection for Tamaki or whether he was asked to leave because of it. However, Aoki himself described Riddell's devotion to her patients, even those who left under difficult circumstances, sending them letters and gifts after their departure.

== Ryukyu Islands and Okinawa Airakuen Sanatorium ==
With another missionary, Arato, Aoki discovered people with leprosy living in caves or other remote areas in the Ryukyu Islands, first on Iejima and later on the main Okinawa Island. The men gave them clothes, food, and spiritual ministry.

At the time, leprosy was still thought contagious and carried immense social stigma. In one village, people burned down the houses of people with the disease. Aoki and Arato also discovered about 40 people with leprosy who had been forced to live in exile on a tiny island called Jalma.

After much repeated shunning and denunciation, the missionaries landed at Yagaji Island (some sources say Gayachi Island); where they acquired a piece of land which Aoki eventually used to found the Kunigami Airakuen Sanatorium (later Okinawa Airakuen Sanatorium) in 1938.

In 1957, Aoki became an official missionary of Okinawa Seikokai (connected with the Episcopal Church). On March 6, 1969, he died of myocardial infarction.

== Haiku ==
Aoki also composed many haiku, including the following:

"Koetekite, Hone o Uzumuru, Hito Ha kana"

Coming over to Okinawa, I am like a leaf, my bones will be buried here.

== Leprosy in Okinawa before Aoki ==
Among the Japanese prefectures, leprosy had the highest incidence in Okinawa Prefecture in 1925, 1935 and 1940. The Okinawa government was inconsistent concerning the establishment of leprosaria.

In 1931, Miyako Hoyoen Sanatorium was established on Miyako Island, but it was met with strong opposition from the Okinawans. Rioting and burning of houses of leprosy patients occurred. With the help of various organizations and individuals such as Mitsuda Kensuke and Hayashi Fumio, the Kunigami Airakuen, now the Okinawa Airakuen Sanatorium, was established due to the efforts and leadership of Aoki.
