= Fumio Hayashi (doctor) =

Japanese physician and leprologist

- Born: November 26, 1900; Sapporo, Hokkaido
- Died: July 18, 1947 (aged 46)
- Occupations: Physician, Director of leper hospitals
- Known for: Completion of lepromin reaction or Mitsuda reaction

Fumio Hayashi (林 文雄, Hayashi Fumio; November 26, 1900 – July 18, 1947) was a Japanese physician and leprologist. He worked in Tama Zenshoen Sanatorium, Nagashima Aiseien Sanatorium, Hoshizuka Keiaien Sanatorium and Ooshima Seishoen Sanatorium. He helped with Kensuke Mitsuda, and completed the first lepromin test or Mitsuda skin test.

== Life ==
He was born November 26, 1900, in Sapporo, Hokkaido. He graduated from Hokkaido University in 1926. He read a paper on lepromin test at a leprosy conference in Bangkok in 1930. He received his Ph.D. in 1931 with a dissertation "skin reaction in leprosy".

In 1931 he became chief doctor in Nagashima Aiseien Sanatorium. In 1933 made an around the world trip of leprosy hospitals and sanatoriums as an inspecting member of the League of Nations. In 1935 he became the director of Hoshizuka Keiaien Sanatorium, and in 1944 he became the director of Ooshima Seishoen Sanatorium.

He died on July 18, 1947.

== Publications ==
- The skin reaction in leprosy, I II III, Tokyo Iji Shinshi, 2661, On Feb 15, 1930.
- The course of leprosy and the Mitsuda skin test. Tokyo Iji Shinshi, 2737,1931.
- The course of patients, whose Mitsuda skin tests were problematic 10 years ago. Tokyo Iji Shinshi, 3156, 1939.
- Personal view on the classification of leprosy. Repura 14, 3, May, 1943.
- Mitsuda's reaction, Nisshin Igaku 33,3,1943.
- An around-the-world trip of leprosy institutions. (Book)
- The history of leprosy on Nauru. Rinsho Igaku, 28,10,1944.
- Mitsuda's skin reaction in leprosy. Hayashi F. Int J Lepr 1, 31–38,1933.

== Lepromin test ==
Kensuke Mitsuda wrote in 1919 his first paper on lepromin test, also called Mitsuda's skin test later. But he regarded himself a pathologist and not an immunologist, so, he wanted other researchers of leprosy who came under him to complete it. Among other researchers, Fumio Hayashi completed it. Hayashi read a paper on it at a leprosy conference at Bangkok. Masao Ota, a dermatologist who also studied leprosy, was very much impressed by the paper, and tried to publish International Journal of Leprosy. Hayashi's paper was in its first issue.
