= Masako Ogawa =

Japanese physician and writer (1902–1943)

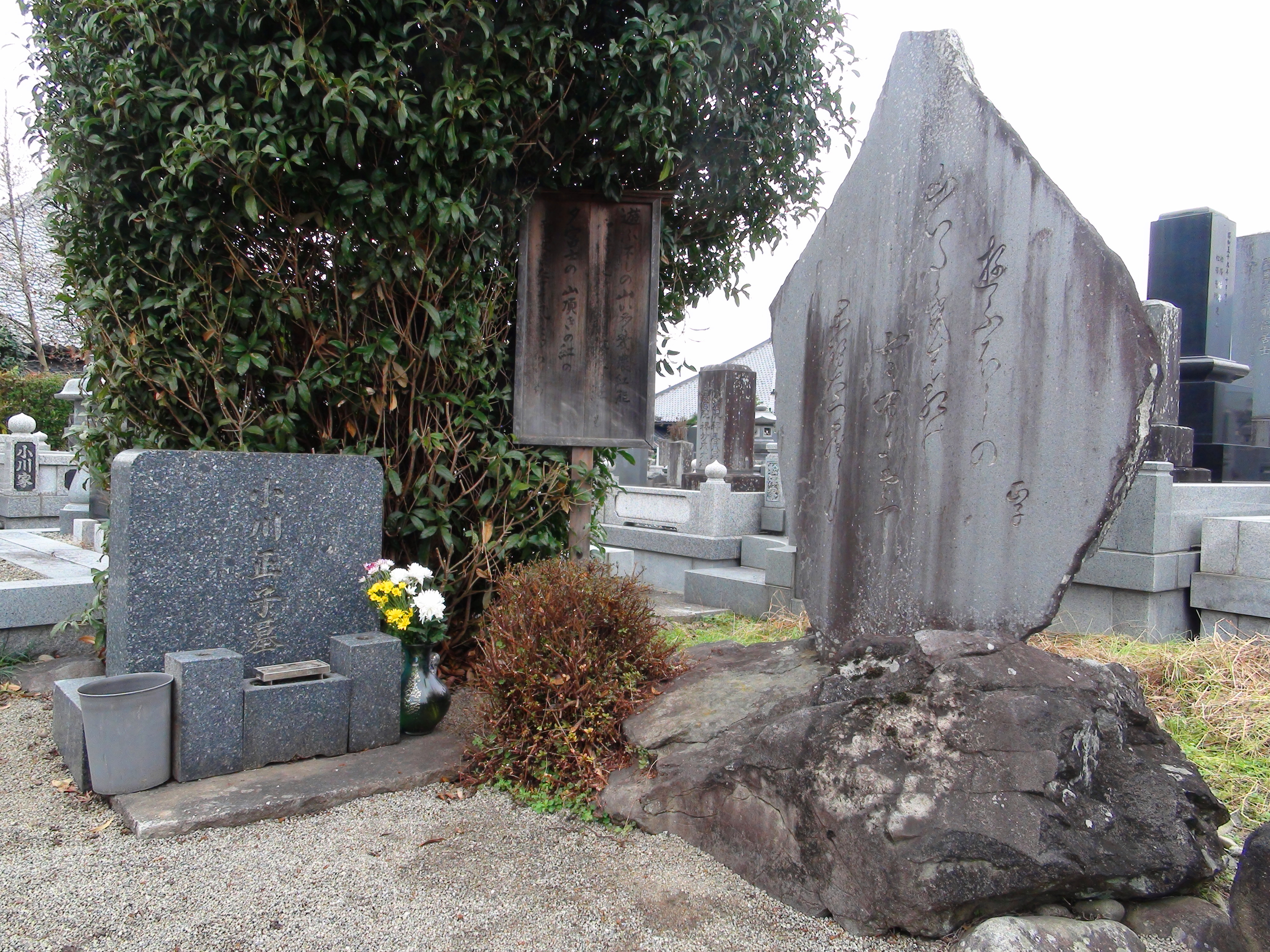
- Grave and monument of Masako Ogawa
- Born: March 26, 1902; Yamanashi Prefecture, Japan
- Died: April 29, 1943 (aged 41)
- Occupation: Physician
- Known for: Writing a book Kojimano Haru based on her experience at a leper hospital

Masako Ogawa (小川 正子, Ogawa Masako; March 26, 1902 – April 29, 1943) was a Japanese medical doctor who worked at the Nagashima Aiseien Sanatorium. She wrote a book, "Spring in a small island" in 1938, about her experiences in persuading leprosy patients in remote areas of Japan into hospitalization. It created a sensation in Japan, and was made into a film. She was criticized for accelerating the "No leprosy patients in prefecture" movement and giving an impression that leprosy is to be feared.

== Career ==
She was born in Yamanashi Prefecture on March 26, 1902. After her marriage in 1920 and divorce in 1923, she entered the Tokyo Women's Medical College in 1924. At graduation, she visited Kensuke Mitsuda, at the Zenshoen Hospital but her application for employment was rejected and she worked at other hospitals.

On June 12, 1934 she went to the Nagashima Aiseien, Okayama Prefecture, where Mitsuda was the director. She was initially hired as informal doctor, then as formal doctor in 1934. Mitsuda ordered her to go on trips to remote areas of the prefecture in order to examine people for leprosy in remote areas and hospitalize those who were affected.

She developed tuberculosis in 1937. At the order of Mitsuda, she wrote a book "Spring in a small island", which was published in 1938. It created a sensation within Japan.

On April 29, 1943, she died of pulmonary tuberculosis. In 1991, the Masako Ogawa Memorial House was built in her home in Yamanashi Prefecture.

== "Spring in a small island" ==
In this book, she wrote her experiences in her trips of examination of leprosy patients in remote mountainous areas and islands. In the first story, her team was composed of a clerk, a male nurse and Masako Ogawa. They brought a projector to show village people that leprosy patients should be treated in sanatoriums. Ogawa described her experiences in visiting patients living in poor houses, finding new patients in the same house of patients. In addition to her book, she wrote tanka, a Japanese short poem.

=== Reaction ===
Mokutaro Kinoshita, a literary critic and physician, wrote that this book gave strong favorable impressions because of the description, the "sincerity" of the author and her literary ability. However, after seeing the movie, he commented that the best method of leprosy control would be by chemotherapy, and not by segregation.

Eiko Arai coined a word "Spring in a small island" phenomenon, explaining the wave of support concerning Masako Ogawa. The trend may represent the sentiments of Japanese against the trend of militarization at that time, although some may see Ogawa as a patriot. Eiko Arai also considered Ogawa to be "a new woman", an independent woman in the Taisho Era. Arai further discussed the Ogawa's faith in Christianity.

=== Criticisms ===
Masako Ogawa was criticized for accelerating the No Leprosy Patients in Our Prefecture Movement, depicting leprosy as a disease to be feared. She reported that pregnancy worsened leprosy, and tried to justify the segregation, which her teacher, Mitsuda, firmly believed.
