= Tachi (surname) =

Tachi (written: 舘 or 立) is a Japanese surname. Notable people with the surname include:

- Hiroshi Tachi (舘 ひろし, born 1950), Japanese actor and singer
- Koki Tachi (舘 幸希, born 1997), Japanese footballer
- Nobuhide Tachi (舘 信秀, born 1947), Japanese racing driver
- Sakutaro Tachi (立 作太郎, 1874–1943), Japanese lawyer
- Shingo Tachi (舘 信吾, 1977–1999), Japanese racing driver
- Susumu Tachi (舘 暲, born 1946), Japanese academic
