= Guy Henry Faget =

American physician (1891–1947)

- Born: 1891; American
- Died: 1947 (aged 55–56)
- Occupations: Physician, Director of a leper hospital at Carville, America
- Known for: Discovery of the effectiveness of promin in the treatment of leprosy in 1943

Guy Henry Faget (1891–1947) was an American medical doctor who revolutionalized the treatment of leprosy, by demonstrating the efficacy of promin, as described in a paper published in 1943. Promin is a sulfone compound, synthesized by Feldman and his co-workers in 1940, which is a chemotherapeutic agent that was determined to be effective against tuberculosis in experimental animals. He was the grandson of Jean Charles Faget, and father of Maxime Faget.

== Life ==
For 25 years he was a distinguished officer of the US Public Health Service. In 1940 he became the director of the United States Marine Hospital (National Leprosarium) at Carville, Louisiana, United States of America. He was a member of the International Leprosy Association (ILA) and a consultant to the Advisory Medical Board of LWM. He died in 1947, as a result of a fall and after being affected by heart disease.

== Leprosy in the United States ==
On May 7 to 9, 1942, he was invited to the 44th Annual Meeting of the Medical Library Association, New Orleans, and read a paper. In this paper he described the present situation of leprosy in the United States, and the National Leprosarium at Carville with photographs. He hinted important progress would be made in the near future.

== Sulfanilamide in the treatment of leprosy ==
This is the paper written immediately before the promin paper. Toxic effects of this drug were considerable, but among 20 cases, it was effective in 6, and another 2 were also effective but on their road to improvement. One case remained unchanged and 10 cases progressed. In its conclusions, they clearly wrote that sulfanilamide cannot be regarded as a curative agent for leprous lesions, either of the macular or lepromatous type.

== The promin treatment of leprosy ==
The side effects of promin were carefully evaluated, and it was concluded that promin could be safely administered, provided that the blood and urine of patients are examined frequently. Among 22 cases, effective in 15 cases (68%), unchanged in 6 cases (27%), worsened in 1 case(5%), and bacilli became negative in 5 cases (23%). In addition, control studies were conducted, which demonstrated significant differences between the promin group and the control group. Impressive photographs were included in the paper.

The original paper contains the following table.

Table 1
| Type | Number | Improved | Stationary | Worse | Bacteriologic reversion from positive to negative |
|---|---|---|---|---|---|
| Mixed, far advanced | 6 | 3 | 2 | 1 | 1 |
| Mixed, moderately advanced | 5 | 4 | 1 | o | 1 |
| Lepromatous, far advanced | 1 | 1 | 0 | 0 | 0 |
| Lepromatous, moderately advanced | 9 | 6 | 3 | 0 | 3 |
| Neural, moderately advanced | 1 | 1 | 0 | 0 | 0 |
| Total | 22 | 15 | 6 | 1 | 5 |

Promin can be considered to have opened a new avenue in the chemotherapy of the mycobacterial diseases. It is hoped that further synthesis of sulfa compound may produce a substance which will succeed in saving countless lives in this still dark field of medicine.

— Faget GH

== Other papers ==
The following papers are based on a Japanese Book Nihon Hifuka Zensho 9,1, "Leprosy"

- Faget GH, Johansen, FA: The diphtheria toxoid treatment of leprosy. Int J Lepr 10,68,1942.
- Faget GH, Pogge RC: Pooled blood plasma transfusion in the treatment of leprosy. Int J Lepr 11,32,1943.
- Faget GH, Pogge RC: Penicillin used unsuccessfully in treatment of leprosy. Int J Lepr 12,7,1944.
- Faget GH, Pogge RC, Johansen FA: Promizole in the treatment of leprosy. Pub Health Rep 61,957,1946.
- Faget GH, Pogge RC, Johansen FA:Present status of Diasone. Pub Health Rep 61,960,1946.
- Faget GH, Pogge RC, Johansen FA, Fite GL, Prejean BM, Gemar F: Present status of promin treatment in leprosy. Int J Lepr 14,30,1946.
- Faget GH, Erickson PT: Use of streptomycin in the treatment of leprosy. Int J Lepr 15,146,1947.
- Faget GH:Chemotherapy of leprosy. Int J Lepr 15,7,1947.
- Faget GH, Erickson PT: Chemotherapy of leprosy. JAMA 136,451,1948.

== A message from Faget ==
This is a message of Faget to leprosy patients which was printed in the Christmas number of the 1941 Star, and therefore is considered to directly address patients for participation in the promin trial.

This is the Modern Age, the Age of Light. Let us have the truth. Leprosy is not a dirt disease. Leprosy is not due to any sin committed by those who contract it. It is not a retaliation of God against its victims. Leprosy is a germ disease just as tuberculosis, typhoid fever and pneumonia are germ diseases. It is no more shameful to be infected with the germs of leprosy than with those of tuberculosis, typhoid or pneumonia. So why discriminate against one of these diseases ? Ignorance is the answer.

Therefore, let us all cooperate and pull together—the patients and personnel. Together we will succeed; divided we will fail. Yes, the day shall come when the dread of leprosy too will pass away just as it did for yellow fever, cholera and tuberculosis. Let us have courage; We are making strides forward and upward, out of the valley of darkness, over the mountains of difficulties, and into the sunshiny plains of tomorrow.

== Honors ==
His discovery paved the way to the complete recovery of leprosy, and many effective chemotherapeutic agents followed. He was honored postmortem at the 7th International Congress of Leprology in Tokyo in 1958 and at the centennial celebration of the Hansen's Disease Center at Carville in 1994.
