= Isamu Tajiri =

Japanese physician

- Born: May 1902; Tokyo
- Died: 1966
- Occupations: Physician and Director of a leper hospital Kikuchi Keifuen Sanatorium, Kumamoto, Japan
- Known for: acute infiltration of Tajiri in leprosy

Isamu Tajiri (田尻 敢, Tajiri Isamu; 1902 – 1966) was a Japanese physician specializing in leprosy. He worked at Nagashima Aiseien Sanatorium, Kikuchi Keifuen Sanatorium and Tama Zenshoen Sanatorium. In 1955, he proposed "acute infiltration" of Tajiri in leprosy.

== Life ==
He was born in Tokyo in 1902, and graduated from Chiba Medical School in 1930. In the same year he started working at Tama Zenshoen Sanatorium. In 1931, he went to Nagashima Aiseien Sanatorium. He became Ph.D. for his studies on leprosy of the respiratory system. In 1947 he went to Tama Zenshoen Sanatorium. Between 1958 and 1963, he was the director of Kikuchi Keifuen Sanatorium, and later he worked at Tama Zenshoen Sanatorium. He died in 1966.

== Published works ==
- Leprosy of the respiratory system Report 1 Trachea, lung, Chiba Igaku Zasshi, 11,2,1933
- Leprosy of the respiratory system Report 2 Nose, Repura, 5,4,467,1934
- Leprosy of the respiratory system Report 3 Mouth, throat, Repura,6,5,1935
- Leprotic changing in the lung, Int J Lepr 3,4,1935
- Leprosy and childbirth Int J Lepr 4,2,1936
- Acute infiltration of leprosy Int J Lepr 23,370-84,1955

== For non-specialists ==
- (Book）Leprosy medicine for general physicians (1951) Igakushoin, Tokyo.
- (Easy medical lectures) Knowledge of Hansen's disease (1955-1960) in Zenkanryo (Patients' organization) Newspapers

== In sanatoriums ==
In Nagashima Aiseien Sanatorium, he was not only a good clinician, but also helped Kensuke Mitsuda when various problems arose. He became the director of Kikuchi Keifuen Sanatorium after Matsuki Miyazaki. Tajiri started reducing the number of in-patients after the so-called "no-leprosy patient in our prefecture" movement.
