= Kentaro Higuchi =

Japanese dermatologist (1907–1994)

- Born: May 14, 1907; Fukuoka Prefecture, Japan
- Died: March 8, 1994 (aged 86)
- Occupation: Physician (Dermatologist)
- Known for: Dermatological studies including the discovery of erythema punctatum Higuchi, Studies on syphilis

Kentaro Higuchi (樋口 謙太郎, Higuchi Kentarō; May 14, 1907 – March 8, 1994) was a Japanese dermatologist and educator.

== Personal history ==
Higuchi was born in Fukuoka Prefecture and graduated from Kyushu Imperial University (now Kyushu University) in 1934. He studied mycology under Mokutaro Kinoshita or Masao Ota. In 1942 he became assistant professor in the Department of Dermatology at Kyushu Imperial University. One year later, he became professor of dermatology at Jakarta University. He was a professor of dermatology at Kurume University in 1947 and at Kyushu University in 1948. In 1957 he studied in Germany. In 1971 he retired from Kyushu University and became professor of dermatology at Fukuoka University.

== Achievements ==
Higuchi wrote more than 450 medical papers on various aspects of dermatology, including mycology and syphilis. More than 100 doctors obtained their PhDs under his instruction. He wrote and edited a number of textbooks on dermatology. He accepted multiple congresses, on topics including dermatology, allergy, mycology and hospital management. At his time, Kyushu University was the most influential university in the Kyushu area, and he himself willingly accepted multiple congresses.

In 1958 he lectured on the treatment of syphilis with antibiotics and proposed the idea of scar in the serum for positive reactions to syphilis in case syphilis is cleared and treatment is unnecessary. His view was favorably received. In a number of examinations for syphilis at his time, the reactions had remained positive, even after satisfactory treatment. So his explanation that the positivity of the examination was only the scar, satisfied multiple physicians.

In 1968 there occurred an outbreak of yushō disease, which later proved to be caused by contamination of rice bran oil with PCBs. A team was organized and produced the book PCB poisoning and pollution under Higuchi's editorship.

== Erythema punctatum Higuchi ==
In 1954 he described a kind of erythema, later named erythema punctatum Higuchi. It is characterized by small erythematous lesions encircled by anemic rings. Insect bites are allegedly its cause.

== Books ==
- Oubei Kikou Igakusha no Me ("My journey to Europe, from a medical doctor's viewpoint"), in Japanese. Oyama shoten, 1959.
- Hitorigoto ("My soliloquies"), in Japanese, 1969.
- Donnerstag ("Dontag"), in Japanese, Nishinihon Shimbun, 1977. Donnerstag is the Fukuoka dialect which has come from the Holland language, and means Sunday.
- Mawaru Fuusha ("Rotating windmills"), in Japanese, Shukousha, 1983.
