= Tada Station =

Tada Station (多田駅) is the name of two train stations in Japan:

- Tada Station (Hyōgo), in the city of Kawanishi, Hyōgo Prefecture
- Tada Station (Tochigi), in Sano, Tochigi
