= Yutaka Kamikawa =

Japanese physician

- Born: 1892; Hiroshima Prefecture, Japan
- Died: 2001 (aged 108–109); Hiroshima Prefecture, Japan
- Occupations: Physician, director of leper hospitals
- Known for: The first director of the Rakuseien Sanatorium, now Losheng Sanatorium in Taiwan in 1930, studies on chaulmoogra oil

Yutaka Kamikawa (上川 豊, Kamikawa Yutaka; 11 May 1892- 2 August 2001) was a Japanese physician, who treated leprosy patients and studied leprosy. He worked at Kikuchi Keifuen Sanatorium and Losheng Sanatorium in Taiwan, and Tohoku Shinseien Sanatorium in Japan and studied chaulmoogra oil.

== Life ==
He was born in Hiroshima Prefecture in 1892 and studied medicine at Nagasaki Medical School, Nagasaki University. In 1919, he worked at Kyushu Sanatorium Kikuchi Keifuen Sanatorium and studied chaulmoogra oil. He obtained Ph.D. from Kyoto University in 1930 and became the first director of national Taiwan Sanatorium, now called Losheng Sanatorium. He intensively studied leprosy patients there. New patients were hospitalized but healed patients were discharged. In 1946 he returned to Japan but lost valuable data during repatriation. In 1947 he worked at Tohoku Shinseien Sanatorium and became its director in 1948. He retired in 1965.

== Death ==
Kamikawa died at 109 in August 2, 2001.

== Works ==
- The beneficial effects of chaulmoogra oil (Report 1–5) (1930)
- The history and distribution of leprosy in Formosa (1940) Int J Leprosy 8,3,345.
- The treatments of leprosy at the present time (1939). A review of 30 pages, presented as a special lecture at the 13th Congress of the Japanese leprosy Association at Sendai.
- 50 years of the Japanese leprosy association from the viewpoint of leprosy control (1977) Jpn J Leprosy 46:168–170.

== Chaulmoogra oil ==
Review of treatments of leprosy, especially on chaulmoogra oil. He made a special lecture on this title at the 13th Congress of the Japanese Association of Leprosy in 1939 at Sendai. His review included treatments of leprosy with gold, silver, cupper, arsenics, iodine, timol, pigments, nonspecific immune therapies, sulfon drugs, vitamine, bacterial toxins, serum therapies, nutritional therapies; especially chaulmoogra oil. On sulphon-amids, he tested Therapol (paraamino-benzolsulfon amid) and found it was effective in 55.6% (10 cases) out of 18 cases. However, he concluded that with Therapol only, the sulphon-amids could not be expected as treatment of leprosy. On chaulmoogra oil, he reported it was effective in 30% in the Kyushu Sanatorium (he studied it between 1919 and 1930) and in 56.6% in Formosa (data between 1930 and 1939), while Hayashi Y. reported that it was effective in 50–80% of cases in the Zenshoen Hospital, Tama Zenshoen Sanatorium. He concluded that chaulmoogra oil was the only hopeful treatment for patients whose leprosy was not severe, and the mechanism was the activation of the immune system by stimulating the reticulo-endothelial system or lymphatic system. This was also the conclusion of his reports for Ph.D. in 1930.

== Honors ==
- November 1965: The Order of the Rising Sun, Second Class.

== Healed, discharged patients at Tohoku Shinseien Sanatorium ==
Year	Patients
1940	9
1941	21
1942	13
1943	8
1944	2
1945	5
1946	3
1947	0
1948	0
1949	3
1950	0
1951	0
1952	1
1953	0
1954	2
1955	1
1956	2
1957	3
1958	2
1959	2
1960	29
1961	7
1962	6
