= Miyako Nanseien Sanatorium =

Coordinates: 24°51′28″N 125°18′15″E

National Sanatorium Miyako Nanseien

Geography
- Location: 888, Shimajiri, Hirara, Miyakojima, Okinawa, Japan

Organisation
- Care system: HealthCare of those who had leprosy
- Type: National hospital run by Ministry of Health, Labour and Welfare (Japan)

Services
- Beds: 258(Japanese law on health and medicine in 2008), 181(in-patients)

History
- Opened: 1931

Links
- Website: http://www.nanseien.com/
- Lists: Hospitals in Japan

Miyako Nanseien Sanatorium, (National Sanatorium Miyako Nanseien) is a sanatorium for leprosy and ex-leprosy patients at Miyakojima, Okinawa Prefecture, Japan, starting in 1931.

== History ==
=== Background ===
Following the establishment of 5 prefectural sanatoriums in 1909, the treatment of patients in Okinawa Prefecture was inconsistent, because of the presence of resistance to the establishment of sanatoriums. On the Miyako Island, however, the resistance was relatively low.

=== Miyako Hoyoen and Miyako Sanatorium ===
- March 6, 1931: Okinawa Prefectural Miyako Hoyoen Sanatorium was opened.
- Oct 6, 1933: National (transient) Sanatorium Miyako Santorium.

=== Miyako Nanseien Sanatorium ===
- Jul 1, 1941: National Sanatorium Miyako Nanseien
- Mar 1945: Destroyed by air raids.
- Jan 1946: Under American rule.
- Apr 1, 1951: Ryukyu Government Sanatorium Miyako Nanseien.
- May 15, 1972: National Sanatorium Miyako Nanseien.
- Apr 1996: The 1953 Leprosy Prevention Law was abolished.
- Jul 1998: The trial for compensation started.
- May 11, 2001: The trial for compensation ruled that the previous Leprosy Prevention was unconstitutional.
- May 25, 2001: The trial for compensation was confirmed. The compensation of 8,000,000 yen to 14,000,000 yen was given to patients depending on the duration of unconstitutional periods.

=== Number of in-patients ===
- The number of in-patients is the sum of patients which changed not only by the newly diagnosed hospitalized and those who died among in-patients, by other factors such as the number of patients who escaped or were discharged, depending on the condition of the times. Recently they were encouraged to be discharged, but the long period of the segregation policy causing leprosy stigma might influence the number of those who went into the society.

| Year | Population |
|---|---|
| 1945 | 139 |
| 1950 | 337 |
| 1955 | 297 |
| 1960 | 347 |
| 1965 | 274 |
| 1970 | 235 |
| 1975 | 241 |
| 1980 | 273 |
| 1985 | 253 |
| 1990 | 211 |
| 1999 | 184 |

| Year | Population |
|---|---|
| 2003 | 131 |
| 2004 | 126 |
| 2005 | 117 |
| 2006 | 107 |
| 2007 | 98 |
| 2008 | 92 |

== Miyako Nanseien and war ==
- Oct 10, 1944:The first air attack at Miyakojima.
- Mar 26, 1945: The second raid, and 1 patient was killed, and 4 or 5 wounded, who later died. Patients began to live in caves or other places.
- April 3, 1945: the sanatorium was completely destroyed.
- Aug 1945: the end of World War II.
- Sept 1945: Patients knew the end of war.
- In 1945, a total of 110 patients died, mostly of malaria and malnutrition.

== Nusudogama (Pirates' cave) ==
- This is a stalactite cave situated in the middle of a cliff some hundred meters from the sanatorium. Genroku Shimoji went to the cave escaping the air raids with several people. He was born in 1924.
  - "There was a big air raid. Airplanes attacked with machine-guns. I went to the Nusudogama, with a child and an old man. Every day people died, and the child and the old man, who was a principal of a school, died. It was an awful task to bring his body to the sanatorium. I got malaria, but I was lucky since I was young. In September, I went out of the cave. All buildings had been burned down and we made small hatches with Adan trees. We planted vegetables and tapioca. Later, American soldiers presented food and clothes (Licensed agencies for relief in Asia)."
