= Hannah Riddell =

British Anglican medical missionary (1855–1932

Personal life
- Born: 17 October 1855 Barnet, Hertfordshire, UKGBI
- Died: 1932 (aged 76–77) Kumamoto, Kumamoto Prefecture, Japan
- Occupation: Medical missionary

Religious life
- Denomination: Anglican

Hannah Riddell (17 October 1855 – 1932) was a British Anglican medical missionary based in Japan, who devoted her life to the care of patients with Hansen's disease. In 1895, Riddell founded Kaishun Hospital.

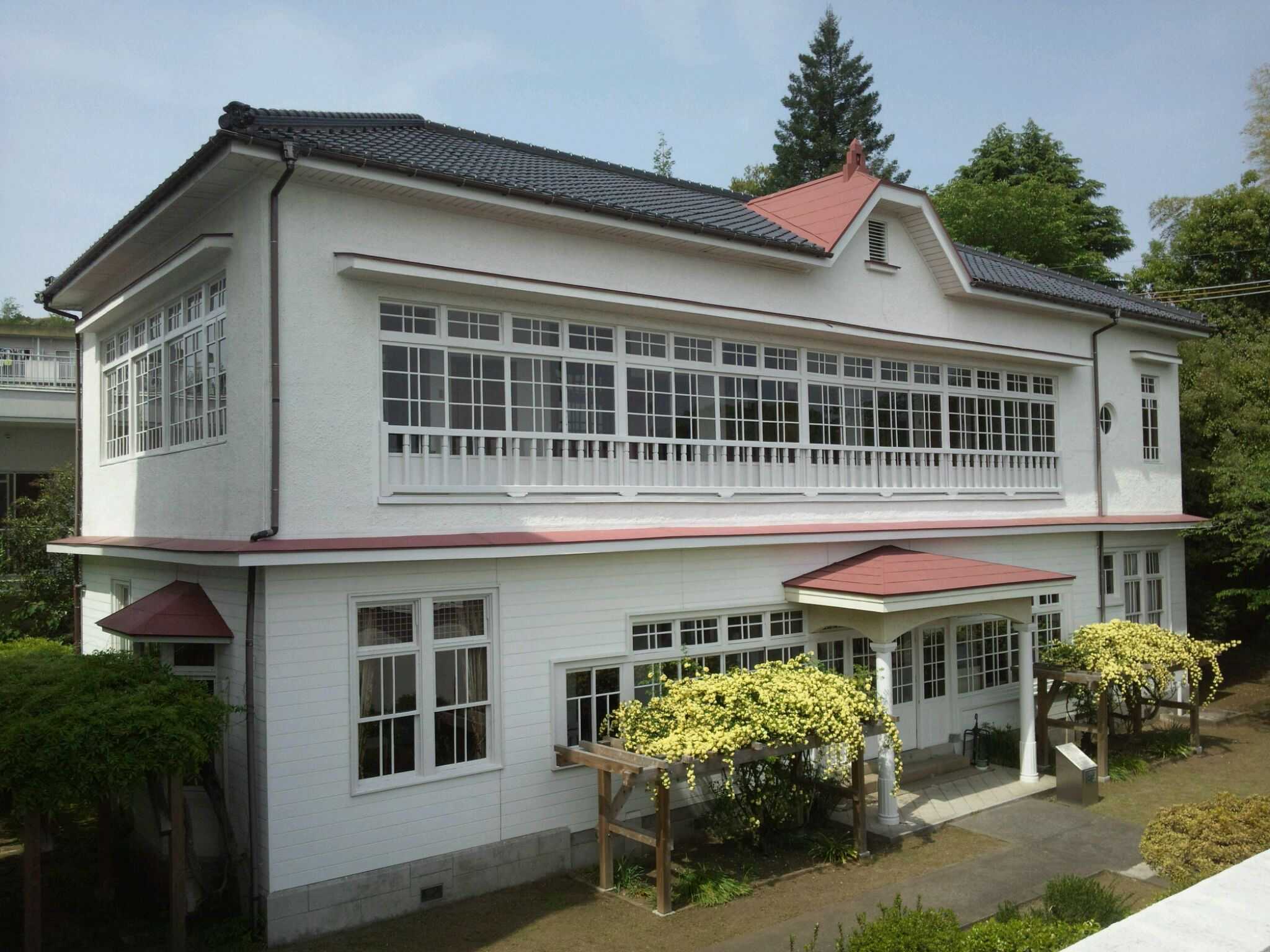
Riddell and Wright Memorial Hall (Kumamoto, Japan)

== Early life ==
Riddell was born on 17 October 1855 at the military barracks in the then village of Barnet, Hertfordshire (present-day North London) to Daniel Riddle (Note: Riddell's father spelt his surname as Riddle rather than Riddell.) (1810–1889), a sergeant, and Hannah Wright (née Hunt; 1814–1886). Riddell's father was a Congregationalist, whilst her mother was member of the Church of England and attended Christ Church Barnet. Riddell was christened in her father's denomination at Barnet's Congregationalist Chapel.

From her parents previous marriages Riddell had three older half siblings. Following the death of her maternal half-brother Samuel Wright in 1872, Riddell's nephew and niece, Ada Wright, lived with the Riddell family.

In 1877, the family moved to Oystermouth where Riddell and her mother started the "Russell House" private school. The school was a success for some time but in 1889 it went into bankruptcy. Riddell later worked in Liverpool as a superintendent for the YWCA.

== Career ==
In 1890 she was selected by the Church Missionary Society (CMS) as a missionary to Japan. She arrived in Japan in 1891 and was transferred to Kumamoto.

At Honmyoji, the most popular temple in Kumamoto, she witnessed leprosy patients begging for mercy and made up her mind to dedicate her life to their care.

=== The Kaishun Hospital ===
Hannah successfully approached influential people such as leaders of the CMS, university professors, industrialists and statesmen, and, later, the imperial family of Japan. She created a close circle of supporters such as Grace Nott, one of the five missionaries who had come to Japan with her, and Professors Honda and Kanazawa. Founding a hospital was an extremely difficult task, but Kaishun Hospital (known in English as the Kumamoto Hospital of the Resurrection of Hope) was opened on 12 November 1895. Negotiations with the CMS were laborious, but in 1900 Hannah won control of the hospital, simultaneously quitting the CMS. She devoted the rest of her life to fund-raising for the hospital. Professors Honda and Kanazawa helped with obtaining the land for it.

The start of the Russo-Japanese War in 1904 brought a great financial crisis. English donors, fearing trouble because of the fleet of Russian warships approaching Japan, immediately stopped sending money to Japan. However, Marquis Okuma, who had donated many cherry and maple trees for the grounds of the hospital, joined with Viscount Shibusawa to invite many officials and prominent persons to the Bankers' Club in Tokyo to listen to Hannah Riddell's appeal. At the meeting Professor Kanazawa spoke for Riddell to the effect that Kaishun Hospital was a good hospital worth supporting, since Riddell was independent of the CMS. As a direct effect of the meeting Riddell's financial troubles ended.

Japan's first leprosy prevention law was promulgated in 1907. In 1914 Riddell wrote in a long letter to Marquis Okuma: "I think the expenses of the government policy would not cost more than a single gunboat and the yearly expenses could well be met by a tax of about one sen (one hundredth of one yen) on every person in the land. The gain to Japan and to the humanity would be immeasurable."

In 1896, Riddell's niece Ada Wright joined her aunt to carry out medical missionary work. After Riddell's death in 1932 Wright became the director of the Kaishun Hospital. The ashes of both Riddell and Wright were buried in the hospital grounds.

=== Further work in Kusatsu, Okinawa and Kumamoto ===
Hannah Riddell was interested in missionary work independent of the CMS. She sent missionaries to Kusatsu, a hot spring resort where lepers gathered. Later Mary Cornwall Legh, another English Anglican missionary, did substantial work there. She also sent Keisai Aoki, who was a patient and a Christian, to Okinawa, where, notwithstanding great difficulties, he succeeded in building a shelter, leading to the establishment of Okinawa Airakuen Leprosy Sanatorium.

Although fundraising was delayed by the outbreak of the Great War in Europe, in 1924 a Japanese-style Anglican church was completed in the grounds of the Kaishun Hospital. Formally consecrated by Bishop of Kyushu, Arthur Lea on 24 June, the church was characterized by a long wheelchair ramp imported from England.

In 1918 Riddell established the first scientific research laboratory in Japan for the study of leprosy.

== Riddell's sex segregation policy of leprosy patients ==
Leprosy is a chronic disease caused by mycobacterium leprae. An effective therapy was discovered in 1941 by Faget, after Riddell's death. Traditionally Japan and Japanese leprologists at that time adopted a segregation policy, but Riddell's thinking was unique. She firmly believed that the only way to stamp out leprosy in Japan was by segregation of the sexes, and she always insisted on it. She was against male and female patients even becoming friendly. Kensuke Mitsuda, a noted leprologist, commented that Riddell believed that what ended leprosy in England in the Middle Ages was the legal abolition of cohabitation of the sexes. The patients at the Kaishun Hospital accepted her segregation, but they could visit their families when indicated.

== Literary contribution ==
Riddell, collaborating with Fanny B. Greene, M. F. Kirby and others, translated Iwaya's Fairy Tales of Old Japan (1903), the English version of Iwaya Sazanami's Nihon mukashi banashi. Iwaya himself and other bibliographies credit Tsuda Ume[ko] as another collaborator.

== See also ==
- History of Kumamoto Prefecture
- Leprosy in Japan
