= Okinawa Airakuen Sanatorium =

Coordinates: 26°40′34.2″N 128°01′08.3″E

Geography
- Location: 1192 Sumuide, Nago, Okinawa, Japan

Organisation
- Care system: HealthCare of those who had leprosy
- Type: National hospital run by Ministry of Health, Labour and Welfare (Japan)

Services
- Beds: 423 (Japanese health and medical law) and 309 (in-patients)

History
- Founded: 1938

Links
- Website: http://www.hosp.go.jp/~airakuen/
- Lists: Hospitals in Japan

The Okinawa Airakuen Sanatorium, also known as the National Sanatorium Okinawa Airakuen, is a facility for current or former leprosy patients located in Nago, Okinawa. It was established in 1938. Here is a summary of its history:

== History ==
=== Major events ===
- November 10, 1938: The Okinawa Prefectural Kunigami Airakuen Sanatorium first opened. It was later renamed the National Kunigami Airakuen Sanatorium in April 1941.
- April 24, 1946: The sanatorium came under the administration of the United States Military Government
- April 1, 1952: Control of the sanatorium was transferred to the newly established Ryukyu Government
- August 26, 1961: The Leprosy Prevention Law was enacted in Okinawa.
- May 15, 1972: Okinawa was returned to Japan, and the sanatorium was renamed the National Sanatorium Okinawa Airakuen.
- April 1, 1996: The Leprosy Prevention Law was abolished.

=== World War II ===
During World War II, the Japanese army admitted a significant number of new leprosy patients to the sanatorium, resulting in overcrowding, food shortages, and poor living conditions. In April 1945, as the Battle of Okinawa began, the director of the sanatorium allowed patients to leave to avoid the battle. By the end of April, the sanatorium had been occupied by US forces.

=== After World War II ===
- August 1945: The director of the army hospital visited the sanatorium.
- March 8, 1946: Yagaji Sanatorium on Yagaji Island was designated as a restricted area.
- 1949: Dr. V. Scorebrand visited the sanatorium and attempted to use promin (a medication).
- March 1951: The Okinawa 'Save the Leprosy Patients' Association was established.
- July 1953: Dr. Doull visited Okinawa and provided recommendations regarding leprosy.
- February 1954: The Jichikai (patients' association) for Airakuen established the Tomonokai association for those discharged from Airakuen and Miyako Nanseien Sanatoriums.
- March 1957: The Japanese Government started sending leprosy specialists to the two Okinawan sanatoriums.
- February 1960: An outpatient clinic was opened in Naha, and similar clinics were established on Ishigakijima and Miyakojima islands.
- 1967: Surveys of Okinawan schoolchildren regarding leprosy began.
- April 1996: The Leprosy Prevention Law of 1953 was abolished.
- July 1998: A compensation trial commenced.
- May 11, 2001: The previous Leprosy Prevention Law was ruled unconstitutional during the trial.
- May 25, 2001: Compensation was awarded in the trial, ranging from 8 to 14 million yen depending on the duration of the unconstitutional period.

=== Number of patients ===
Year	In-patients
1945	657
1950	881
1955	909
1960	936
1965	755
1970	670
1975	655
1980	697
1985	641
1990	583
1995	539
1999	472

Year	In-patients
2003	355
2004	341
2005	326
2006	309
2007	291
2008	276

== See also ==
- Nami Matsuda
- Keisai Aoki
