= Matsuki Miyazaki =

Japanese medical doctor

- Born: January 10, 1900; Yatsushiro, Kumamoto
- Died: June 14, 1972 (aged 72)
- Occupations: Physician, Director of Kikuchi Keifuen Sanatorium (1934 - 1958)
- Known for: Studies on War and Leprosy (1948), Segregationalist of leprosy control, Foundation of a leper institution in India and death from an airplane accident

Matsuki Miyazaki (宮崎 松記, Miyazaki Matsuki; January 10, 1900 – June 14, 1972) was a Japanese medical doctor, the director of the Kyushu Sanatorium (Kikuchi Keifuen Sanatorium) (1934–1958) in Kumamoto, Japan. He studied war and leprosy and found that stress was a great factor in the development of leprosy. He later established a leprosy center belonging to Japan Leprosy Mission of Asia, in India. He died in the Japan Airlines Flight 471 airplane accident in 1972.

== Life ==
=== Early life ===
He was born in Yatsushiro City, Kumamoto Prefecture in 1900. He was interested in leprosy when he was a Fifth Higher School student. He visited the neighboring Kaishun Byoin, a leprosy hospital which Hannah Riddell established. After studying at the Medical Faculty, Kyoto Imperial University, he became a chief surgeon at the Osaka Red Cross Hospital. In 1934, he was named the director of the Kyushu Leprosarium. (Later, renamed Kikuchi Keifuen Sanatorium)

=== Kikuchi Keifuen Sanatorium ===
He had been the director for difficult years between 1934 and 1958, since there were great and constant changes in the treatment and life of leprosy patients in the sanatorium. He invited a branch of the National Hansen's Disease Research Institute to his sanatorium (1955–1957), and activated research works for many medical doctors.

Concerning the segregation policy, he testified before the Upper House that all patients be hospitalized, and during the history of the Kikuchi Keifuen, the hospitalized patients became the maximum number at his resignation. He has been criticized for his stubborn segregation policy.

=== Japan Leprosy Mission of Asia in India (Jalma Center) ===
In 1959, he traveled to India to study the leprosy situation there. In 1964, he established a leprosy center of Japan Leprosy Mission of Asia, in Agra, India(Jalma Center) and assumed the post of the first director. It was established for the purpose of cooperative basic research of leprosy among Asian nations. Following his death in 1972, Mitsugu Nishiura served as the second director of the Center. In 1976, this center was transferred to the Indian Government.

== His Studies on War and Leprosy ==
He made intensive studies on war and leprosy. In 1937, he demanded the Army and Navy authorities that those who developed leprosy during service should receive increased pension (treatment same as those who developed tuberculosis during service). It was realized in 1940.

He read an invited paper in 1947 at a Japanese leprosy congress, and published it. Studying patients with leprosy in his sanatorium who had developed while serving for the Army and Navy of Japan; he discussed various factors such as the kinds of stress, the duration of the draft and the development of symptoms, and concluded that one of the incentives was enormous stress.

== Tatsudaryo Incident (Kurokami Primary School Incident) ==
For the children born of patients, there was a small facility called Tatsudaryo, and he endeavoured so that the pupils would attend a normal primary school. Because of leprosy stigma, social disturbances including strikes of schooling occurred. Although he worked in order to reduce leprosy stigma, this incident reminded people that leprosy stigma was still deep-rooted at that time.
