= Hoshizuka Keiaien Sanatorium =

Coordinates: 31°20′32″N 130°51′31″E

National Sanatorium Hoshizuka Keiaien
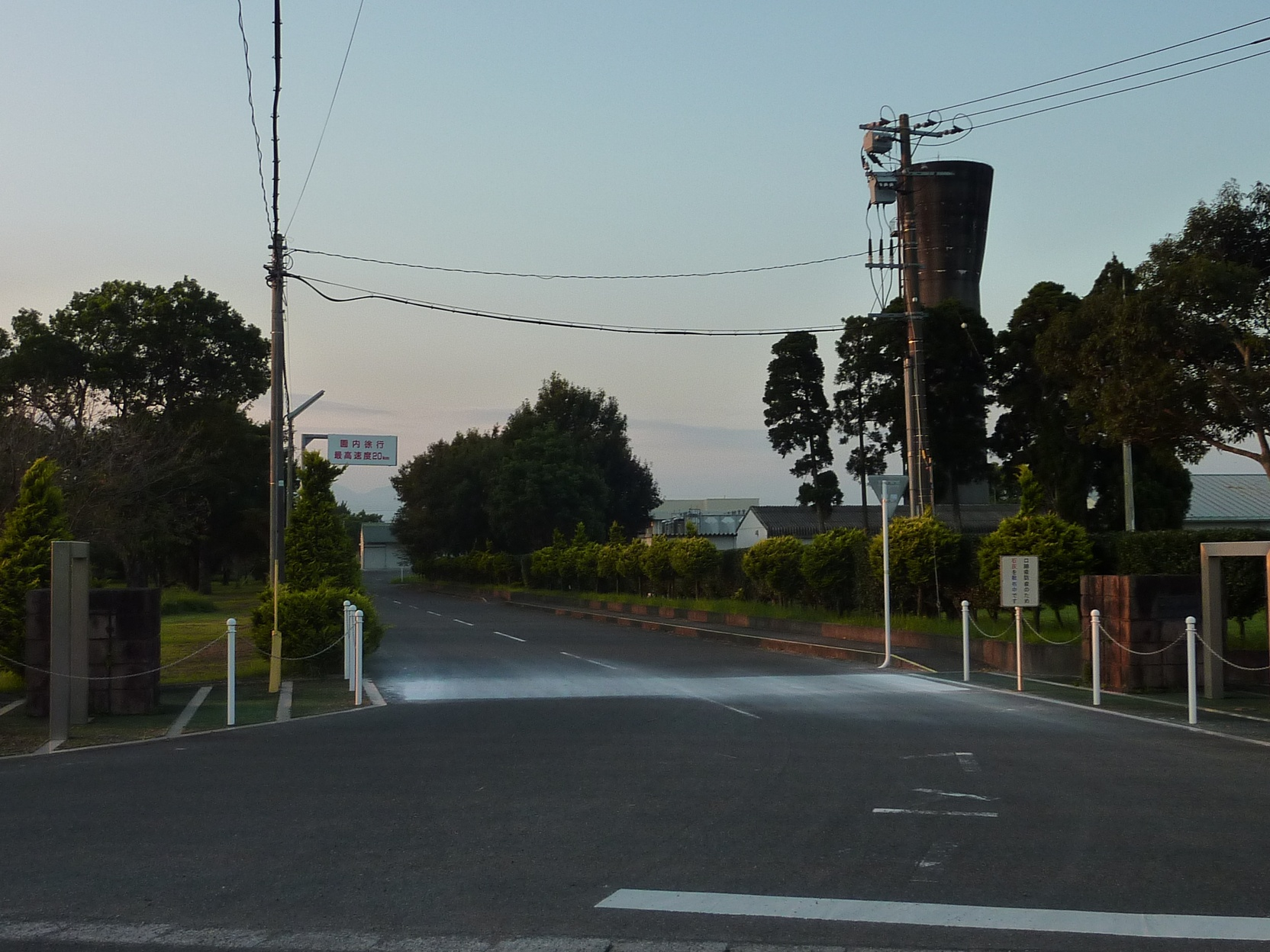
- Hoshizuka Keiaien Sanatorium

Geography
- Location: 4204 Hoshizukacho, Kanoya, Kagoshima, Japan

Organisation
- Care system: HealthCare of those who had leprosy
- Type: National hospital run by Ministry of Health, Labour and Welfare (Japan)

Services

History
- Opened: 1935

Links
- Website: www.hosp.go.jp/~keiaien/
- Lists: Hospitals in Japan

Hoshizuka Keiaien Sanatorium, (National Sanatorium Hoshizuka Keiaien) is a sanatorium for leprosy patients or ex-leprosy patients in Kanoya-shi, kagoshima-ken, Japan which was established in 1935.

== History ==
=== Background ===
Following the establishment of prefectural sanatoriums, the Japanese government decided to increase sanatoriums, first with National Sanatorium Nagashoma Airakuen in 1930. Hoshizuka Keiaien was the 4th sanatorium which was established in 1935. Unlike other areas, resistance to the establishment of this sanatorium was small.

=== Hoshizuka Keiaien ===
- Oct 28, 1935: The opening ceremony was held. The first director was Fumio Hayashi.
- Feb 1944: The 2nd director was Einosuke Shionuma.
- Mar 18, Jun 8, Aug 12, 1945: Air raids with 6 patients killed.
- Apr 1996: The 1953 Leprosy Prevention Law was abolished.
- Jul 1998: The trial for compensation started.
- May 11, 2001: The trial for compensation ruled that the previous Leprosy Prevention was unconstitutional.
- May 25, 2001: The trial for compensation was confirmed. The compensation of 8,000,000 yen to 14,000,000 yen was given to patients depending on the duration of unconstitutional periods.

=== Number of Patients on March 31 next year ===
The number of in-patients is the sum of patients which changed not only by the newly diagnosed hospitalized and those who died among in-patients, by other factors such as the number of patients who escaped or were discharged, depending on the condition of the times. Recently they were encouraged to be discharged, but the long period of the segregation policy causing leprosy stigma might influence the number of those who went into the society.

Year	Number of in-patients
1935	368
1940	891
1943	1347*maximum
1950	976
1960	1160
1970	974
1980	828
1984	741

Year	Number of in-patients
2003	359
2004	339
2005	319
2006	290
2007	279
2008	265

== Promin worked ==
It was at the congress of the Japanese Leprosy Association held in the Keiaien Sanatorium on November 2 and 3, 1947 that the effects of promin were first reported. At first it did not attract attention since cepharanthin, a new drug for leprosy which had been tested earlier proved disappointing. Promin use started in November 1948, and the effects of promin were amazing. "Give us promin" movement began. The first patient cleared with promin was discharged in April, 1953.

- "Rai-iete, En-wo Sariyuru Wakamono o Gaku-narashitsutu Warera Miokuru."
  - (A young man is leaving our sanatorium, cleared of leprosy, we see him go off, with delightfully played march) This was one of the tanka poems recited before the Emperor and Empress of Japan next January.

== Scabies ==
Leprosy in earlier days has been associated with scabies, and this has been pointed out by Kensuke Mitsuda. There were many cases of scabies.

- 1935: 83cases
- 1937: 195 cases
- 1938: 3146 cases
- 1939: 5298 cases
- 1940: 7950 cases
- 1945: too many
- 1946: 12017
- 1952: No record

== Vasectomy ==
- Vasectomy was started by Kensuke Mitsuda in 1915. Leprosy usually worsens in women during pregnancy and delivery. Married patients usually could not bring up babies, and children born of leprosy patients could be stigmatized in the future. However, the real reason was to exterminate leprosy patients. There were 334 cases of vasectomy between 1936 and 1971 in the Keiaien Sanatorium.
- There were 45 cases of interrupted pregnancy between 1950 and 1959.
