= Ooshima Seishoen Sanatorium =

Coordinates: 34°24′34″N 134°06′25″E

National Sanatorium Ooshima Seishōen
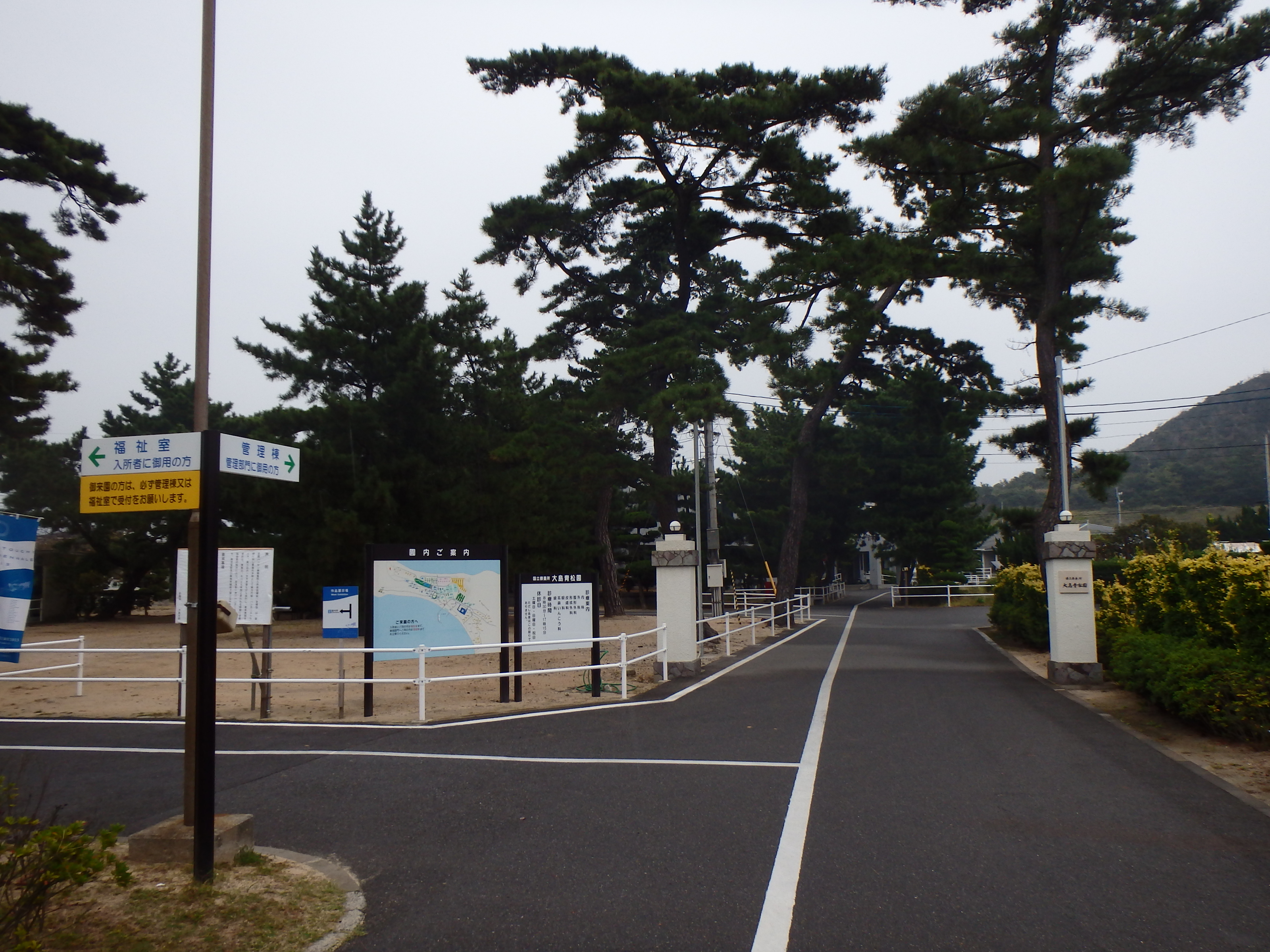

Geography
- Location: 6034-1, Aji-cho, Takamatsu, Kagawa, Japan

Organisation
- Care system: HealthCare of those who had leprosy
- Type: National hospital run by Ministry of Health, Labour and Welfare (Japan)

History
- Opened: 1909

Links
- Website: http://www.k4.dion.ne.jp/~poet/ooshima.html
- Lists: Hospitals in Japan

Ooshima Seishōen Sanatorium, or National Sanatorium Ooshima Seishōen is a sanatorium for leprosy or ex-leprosy patients, situated in a small island called Ooshima, Takamatsu-shi, Kagawa-ken, Japan which was established in 1909.

== History ==
=== Background ===
- The Japanese Government promulgated the first leprosy prevention law on March 19, 1907, but it became effective on April 1, 1909 because of financial difficulties. Japan was divided into 5 areas, and the fourth area included Shimane Prefecture, Okayama Prefecture, Hiroshima Prefecture, Yamaguchi Prefecture, Tokushima Prefecture, Kagawa Prefecture, Ehime Prefecture and Kōchi Prefecture. In this area, Kagawa Prefecture was selected as the site of the sanatorium.
- Two main reasons for the leprosy prevention law were, 1)foreigners who came into Japan after the Meiji Restoration（1868), were very much surprised to find wandering leprosy patients in Japan, and 2) the Japanese Government was worried about the considerable number of leprosy patients among those who were examined for the drafts at age 20.

=== Ooshima Seishoen ===
- Apr 1, 1909: Prefectural Ooshima Leprosarium was established in a small island 8 km off from the port of Takamatsu.
- 1910:Prefectural Ooshima Sanatorium.
- July 1, 1941: National Leprosarium Ooshima Seishoen.
- Nov, 1946: National Sanatorium Ooshima Seisoen.
- Apr 1947: "Patient Comfort Money" started. This was changed to "Patient Salary Money" in 1971, which was equivalent to the National Pension for Handicapped Grade 1.
- 1948: Promin treatment started.
- 1961: Aid work by patients began to be transferred to employees.
- Apr 1996: The 1953 Leprosy Prevention Law was abolished.
- Jul 1998: The trial for compensation started.
- May 11, 2001: The trial for compensation ruled that the previous Leprosy Prevention was unconstitutional.
- May 25, 2001: The trial for compensation was confirmed. The compensation of 8,000,000 yen to 14,000,000 yen was given to patients depending on the duration of unconstitutional periods.

=== The Number of Patients ===
- The number of in-patients is the sum of patients which changed not only by the newly diagnosed hospitalized and those who died among in-patients, by other factors such as the number of patients who escaped or were discharged, depending on the condition of the times. Recently they were encouraged to be discharged, but the long period of the segregation policy causing leprosy stigma might influence the number of those who went into the society.

Year	Number of in-patients
1945	590
1950	647
1955	694
1960	685
1965	624
1970	559
1975	526
1980	496
1985	442
1990	369
1995	305
1999	253

Year	Number of in-patients
2003	188
2004	170
2005	158
2006	155
2007	138
2008	127
