= Kikuchi Keifuen Sanatorium =

Coordinates: 32°52′56″N 130°45′10″E

National Sanatorium Kikuchi Keifuen

Geography
- Location: 3790, Koshi, Kumamoto, Japan

Organisation
- Care system: HealthCare of those who had leprosy
- Type: National hospital run by Ministry of Health, Labour and Welfare (Japan)

Services
- Beds: 877(Japanese law on health and medicine in 2008), 412(in-patients)

History
- Founded: 1909

Links
- Website: http://www.hosp.go.jp/~keifuen/
- Lists: Hospitals in Japan

Kikuchi Keifuen Sanatorium or National Sanatorium Kikuchi Keifuen is a sanatorium for leprosy patients or ex-leprosy patients at Kohshi-shi, Kumamoto-ken, Japan founded in 1909. The mean age of residents (ex-patients) is about eighty.

== History ==
=== Background ===
The Japanese Government promulgated the first leprosy prevention law on March 19, 1907, but did not come into effect until April 1, 1909, because of financial constraints. Under this law, patients who did not have family to support them were forcibly treated in public leprosaria. Japan was divided into five areas, the fifth of which included Nagasaki-ken, Fukuoka Prefecture, Ooita Prefecture, Saga Prefecture, Kumamoto Prefecture, Miyazaki Prefecture and Kagoshima Prefecture. In this area, Kumamoto was selected as the site of the sanatorium.

The two main reasons for the leprosy prevention law were that foreigners visiting Japan after the Meiji Restoration (1868) were very much surprised to find leprosy sufferers wandering at large, and claimed that something should be done about it and the Japanese Government was worried about a large number of people with the condition among those who were examined for the draft at age 20.

== Kyushu Sanatorium ==
- April 1, 1909: The Kyushu Leprosy Sanatorium, serving seven prefectures, opened. (Director: Masayuki Kawamura)
- 1910: Name changed to Kyushu Sanatorium.
- 1926: Jichi Kai (Patients' Association) started.
- 1934: Matsuki Miyazaki became director of the sanatorium.
- 1940: 157 patients of Honmyoji settlements forcibly hospitalized.
- Feb 3, 1941: 58 patients from Kaishun Hospital accepted.

== National Sanatorium Kikuchi Keifuen ==
- July 1, 1941: Name changed to National Sanatorium Kikuchi Keifuen.
- May 13, 1945: Air raid in which two patients were killed.
- May 1951: The first issue of the "Kikuchi-no" journal of Jichi Kai.
- Jun 1951: Main Building opened.
- Nov 1951: First patient discharged, cleared with the drug Promin.
- 1958: Matsuki Miyazaki, a segregationalist, left the Kikuchi Keifuen Sanatorium.
- Apr 1982: Kyushu Medical Center opened (center for 3 Kyushu sanatoriums).
- Apr 1996: The 1953 Leprosy Prevention Law was abolished and residents (ex-patients) have been encouraged to leave the sanatorium.
- Jul 1998: The trial for compensation started.
- May 11, 2001: The trial for compensation ruled that the previous Leprosy Prevention laws were unconstitutional.
- May 25, 2001: The result of the trial for compensation was confirmed. Compensation of 8,000,000 yen to 14,000,000 yen was given to patients depending on the duration of the unconstitutional periods for which they had been detained.
- Apr 1998: Dermatology clinic opened for health insurance system.
- Dec 2006: Keifuen Museum opened. (Open Mon-Fri. 11 a.m.-4 p.m.)

=== Number of patients ===
Year	Number of In-patients
1909	115
1920	226
1930	654
1940	1093
1950	1111
1958*	1734*
1960	1635
1970	1463
1980	1250
1990	988
2000	683
2003	592
2004	557
2005	552
2006	483
2007	456
2008	426

The number of patients in the sanatorium varied. It depended on the numbers admitted, the number of deaths among residents and the number of patients who escaped or were discharged, Recently they were encouraged to be discharged, but for a long period, the segregation policy which caused leprosy stigma influenced the number of those who left and were readmitted into society.

=== Directors ===
- Masayuki Kawamura (Apr 1909-Jul 1933)
- Sadaaki Tamiya (Nov 1933-Jan 1934)
- Matsuki Miyazaki (Jun 1934-Sep 1958)
- Isamu Tajiri (Sep 1958-Jun 1963)
- Kazuchika Shiga (Jul 1963-Sep 1976)
- Shigeru Kumamaru (Dec 1976-Mar 1991)
- Jiro Mizuoka (Apr 1991-Mar 1994)
- Masao Yufu (Apr 1994-Apr 2004)
- Masataka Harada (May, 2004-)

=== Other personalities ===
- Yoshitsugu Satake: Recipient of the Sakurane Award in 1967 for the development of anti-leprosy medications.
- Mamoru Uchida: Teacher of tanka (short poems).
- Yutaka Kamikawa: (1892-2001) Japanese physician, who treated leprosy patients and studied leprosy.

=== Four big incidents at Kikuchi Keifuen ===
==== Forced hospitalization of leprosy patients at Honmyoji Temple ====
On July 9, 1940, 157 patients living around Honmyoji temple were forcibly hospitalized and sent to other sanatoriums. This incident was also called the Honmyoji incident. This was considered to be one of the "no leprosy patients in our prefecture" movements.

==== Fujimoto's case ====
Matsuo Fujimoto was considered to have received unfair treatments in two trials because he was a leprosy patient.

==== Tatsudaryo incident or Kurokami primary school incident ====
Children born from patients with leprosy were denied schooling at Kurokami primary school in 1954. There were strikes, riots and no schooling for some time. After one year, three children finally attended the school from the house of Mr. Takahashi, the President of Kumamoto College of Commerce. See also Tatsudaryo Incident

==== Hotel reservation rejection incident ====
Also called the Aisutaa incident, because of the name of the hotel. The hotel building was destroyed by the hotel administration.
