= Christal Burnette =

Christal Burnette (who is also known as Christal Haitai) is a health professional, plant specialist, writer, and researcher based in Okinawa, Japan. Burnette's research focuses on the intersection of longevity, culture, and social connection in the Okinawan population.

== Early life and education ==
Christal Burnette was born in 1993 in Florida, United States, and later moved to Japan to pursue higher education. She completed her undergraduate degree at the University of Florida and Aoyama Gakuin University. She also studied at the Graduate School of Agriculture, University of the Ryukyus in Okinawa, where she completed a master's degree in 2018. Before she completed her studies, she became involved with local longevity research and has appeared in interviews and podcast episodes discussing the Okinawan diet and lifestyle.

== Career ==
Burnette is the managing director of Haitai Corporation and treasurer of the American Chamber of Commerce in Okinawa. She established Haitai Corporation to communicate and advance Okinawa's longevity globally. She also works as a health and plant specialist at the Okinawa Research Center for Longevity Science, which investigates factors contributing to longevity among older adults in Okinawa.

In 2024, Burnette spoke at the Dubai Future Forum on the panel "Longevity Cities: Utopia or Dystopia?”. She has discussed her research in media interviews with National Geographic, Real Simple, Well+Good, and Radio New Zealand, and has appeared on the 100 Not Out podcast. Her essays on community and aging have been published in More or Less magazine.

== Focus and perspectives ==
Burnette's articles in outlets such as National Geographic and Real Simple discuss Okinawan longevity, covering topics including diet, cultural practices like ikigai (sense of purpose) and moai (social support networks), and the relationship between social connections and health outcomes.
