= Stitch! The Movie =

2003 film by Tony Craig and Bobs Gannaway

- DVD cover featuring (clockwise from lower-left) Lilo Pelekai, Sparky (Experiment 221), Experiment 625 (Note: Although known today as Reuben, Experiment 625 did not receive his name until Leroy & Stitch (2006).) and Stitch
- Directed by: Tony Craig; Bobs Gannaway
- Written by: Bobs Gannaway; Jess Winfield
- Produced by: Tony Craig; Jess Winfield; Bobs Gannaway
- Starring: Chris Sanders; Daveigh Chase; Jeff Bennett; David Ogden Stiers; Kevin McDonald; Kevin Michael Richardson
- Edited by: Tony Mizgalski
- Music by: Michael Tavera (Themes by Alan Silvestri)
- Production company: Walt Disney Television Animation
- Distributed by: Buena Vista Home Entertainment (Note: Released through the Walt Disney Pictures banner.)
- Release date: August 26, 2003
- Running time: 60 minutes
- Country: United States
- Language: English

Stitch! The Movie is a 2003 American direct-to-video animated science fiction comedy film produced by Walt Disney Television Animation and Rough Draft Korea, released on August 26, 2003. It is produced by Tony Craig, Jess Winfield and Bobs Gannaway, who co-wrote and co-directed it with the former two, respectively. It is the second film released in the Lilo & Stitch franchise and the third film chronologically, taking place after the original film and (by later extension) the 2005 direct-to-video sequel Lilo & Stitch 2: Stitch Has a Glitch. The film additionally serves as the backdoor pilot of the spin-off sequel series Lilo & Stitch: The Series, which Craig, Winfield and Gannaway executive produced and debuted the following month. The story is an introduction to Jumba Jookiba's other experiments (made prior to Stitch) that he created via the financing of Dr. Jacques von Hämsterviel.

== Plot ==
Stitch has been trying to adapt to life with Lilo in Hawaii, but has a hard time fitting in without causing more disasters. Lilo tries to encourage him by saying he is one-of-a-kind, but he desires others whom he could consider his "cousins". Meanwhile, Gantu, the ex-captain of the Galactic Armada, is hired by Dr. Jumba Jookiba's former partner, the diminutive and rodent-like Dr. Jacques von Hämsterviel, to retrieve his other experiments. Gantu goes to Earth and abducts Jumba, finding and taking a dehydrated pod containing Experiment 625; Stitch and Lilo take Jumba's spaceship and battle Gantu, only to be defeated and fall back to Earth.

Back at their house, Lilo, Stitch and Pleakley find the container Jumba was hiding. Pleakley realizes that it contains the other experiments, also in pods, and warns them not to tell anyone about or reactivate the experiments, aware of how dangerous they are. Deliberately disobeying their orders, Lilo and Stitch retrieve the container and reactivate the electrokinetic Experiment 221, who promptly escapes into the night. Jumba is being held captive by Hämsterviel, who requests that the experiments be turned over to him, believing it is where they belong. Unable to intimidate Jumba, Hämsterviel activates Experiment 625 to assault him. However, despite 625 having all of Stitch's abilities, along with increased intelligence that allows him to speak proper English, he is lazy and cowardly, prioritizing making sandwiches above all else. Meanwhile, Pleakley contacts Hämsterviel's ship via telephone, who proceeds to demand a ransom of the other experiments in return for Jumba. Nani calls Cobra Bubbles to seek his assistance while Lilo and Stitch go out to find 221. They track down 221 at a nearby hotel and successfully catch him with a glass vase; Stitch soon befriends him, realizing he has finally found a "cousin" of his own.

The rendezvous time arrives and Pleakley and Cobra show up to trade the container for Jumba, but Hämsterviel is annoyed to find one is missing. Lilo and Stitch soon arrive with 221, now dubbed "Sparky", and declares that it and all the experiments are a part of their ʻohana. They release Sparky and break Jumba from his bonds, just as Cobra signals the Grand Councilwoman's ship to rise out of the nearby ocean to blast Hämsterviel. Lilo protests, since he still has the other experiments, so Sparky uses his electrical abilities to disrupt the power on the ship, allowing Hämsterviel and Gantu to escape on their ship with the experiments, as Lilo, Stitch and Sparky stow away.

Inside the ship, Lilo and Stitch seize the container from Gantu, and in the ensuing struggle, a window opens; to keep air from leaking out, Gantu blocks it with the container and ends up releasing the dehydrated pods, which rain down and scatter all throughout Hawaii. Having captured the duo, Hämsterviel reveals his plans to clone Stitch a thousand times over, as he is strapped to a weight he cannot lift, while Gantu puts Lilo in a teleportation pod to send her to an intergalactic zoo. Before Stitch is vivisected by a laser for the cloning process, Sparky sabotages the machine, releasing him as the duo strap Hämsterviel to the device before rescuing Lilo.

The trio then sabotage Gantu's ship, forcing him and 625, whom he reluctantly takes in as his new sidekick, to land near a waterfall on Kauai. Landing Hämsterviel's ship back at the rendezvous point, they give Sparky a new home at the Kīlauea Lighthouse, where he can resume its operations. (Note: In real life, Kīlauea Lighthouse actually was not operational at the time this film was released. The real lighthouse was deactivated in 1976 but resumed operation in 2013, albeit only for ceremonial purposes.) They then persuade the Grand Councilwoman to let them rehabilitate the other experiments. The Councilwoman has Hämsterviel apprehended and grants Lilo and Stitch the task of tracking down the other experiments. At that moment, several of them (Note: Namely, Experiments 202, 529, 455, 489 and 390, who are respectively named Jam, Digger, Mary, Huggo and Slimy according to the experiments list seen in the credits of Leroy & Stitch (2006)) are activated by various means and Lilo and Stitch drive off in Jumba's dune buggy, putting the events of the series in motion.

In a post-credits scene, Jumba and Pleakley hope to go home with the Grand Councilwoman this time, but they are left stranded on Earth once more.

== Voice cast ==
- Chris Sanders as Stitch / Experiment 626, a koala-like illegal genetic experiment who was adopted by the Pelekai sisters and found a purpose as part of their family
- Daveigh Chase as Lilo Pelekai, the eccentric Native Hawaiian girl who adopted Stitch
- Frank Welker as Sparky / Experiment 221, an electrokinetic predecessor to Stitch
- Jeff Bennett as Dr. Jacques von Hämsterviel, Jumba's former colleague and Gantu's new employer
- David Ogden Stiers as Dr. Jumba Jookiba, the mad scientist who created Stitch
- Kevin McDonald as Wendy Pleakley, a former Galactic Federation agent
- Kevin Michael Richardson as Gantu, the former captain of the Galactic Armada
- Tia Carrere as Nani Pelekai, Lilo's older sister and legal guardian
- Ving Rhames as Cobra Bubbles, a social worker assigned to the Pelekai sisters
- Rob Paulsen as Reuben / Experiment 625, Stitch's intelligent and sandwich-loving predecessor
- Dee Bradley Baker as David Kawena, a surfer and Nani's on-and-off love interest

Other voices, listed as "With the Voice Talents of":

- Corey Burton as a Hawaiian man
- Zoe Caldwell as the Grand Councilwoman, the head of the Galactic Federation
- Tress MacNeille as the computer of Hämsterviel's ship
- Kunewa Mook as Moses Puloki, Lilo's hula instructor
- Liliana Mumy as Mertle Edmonds, Lilo's hula classmate and rival
- Jess Winfield as various voices
- Lili Ishida as Yuki (uncredited)
- Jillian Henry as Elena (uncredited)
- Kali Whitehurst as Teresa (uncredited)

== Production ==
Presented by Walt Disney Pictures and produced by Walt Disney Television Animation, Stitch! The Movie is the lead-in to Lilo & Stitch: The Series.

At some point, there was a decision to only have Stitch's name in the titles of both the film and the subsequent series, which was planned to be called Stitch! The TV Series. Eventually, this was abolished, resulting in both this film and The Series having mismatched names. The Stitch! name (with exclamation point) was used as the title for an anime series five years after this film's release.

== Critical reception ==
On the review aggregator website Rotten Tomatoes, 20% of 5 critics' reviews are positive, with an average rating of 4.8/10.

In a 2019 list of direct-to-video sequels, prequels, and "mid-quels" to Disney animated films, Petrana Radulovic of Polygon ranked Stitch! The Movie tenth out of twenty-six films, the lowest of the Lilo & Stitch sequel films on her list. Radulovic wrote that she liked the message of Stitch finding his family, but criticized it for not being as funny as the original Lilo & Stitch film, stating that "some of the [mundane] charm of Lilo & Stitch[...]is lost in favor of chasing a new alien [Sparky] and introducing the rabbitlike villain [Hämsterviel] who just wants world domination."

In a similar list in 2020, Lisa Wehrstedt of Insider ranked Stitch! The Movie seventeenth out of twenty-five films, which was also the lowest of the Lilo & Stitch sequels on her list. Wehrstedt wrote that she believed the film's premise did not warrant a full feature film, and its finale was too "open-ended" to have Stitch! The Movie "work as a stand-alone film like the rest of the Lilo & Stitch sequels." However, she nonetheless claimed that "everything in the Lilo & Stitch world has an irresistible charm that propels it up many ranks considering what its plot and animation quality would be able to achieve without a bunch of cute little monsters."

At the 31st Annie Awards, Stitch! The Movie was nominated for the Annie Award for Best Animated Home Entertainment Production but lost to The Animatrix.
