= List of Lilo & Stitch characters =

The main characters of Lilo & Stitch (plus the Pelekai residence in the background) as they appear in Lilo & Stitch: The Series. From left to right: Cobra Bubbles, David Kawena, Nani Pelekai, Lilo Pelekai, Stitch, Dr. Jumba Jookiba, and Pleakley.

Disney's Lilo & Stitch is an American science fiction media franchise that began in 2002 with the animated film of the same name written and directed by Chris Sanders and Dean DeBlois. The franchise, which consists of four animated films, three animated television series, a live-action adaptation, and several other spin-offs, is noted for its unusual and eclectic cast of fictional characters, both human and alien.

== Characters introduced in Lilo & Stitch (2002) ==
=== Stitch (X-626) ===
Stitch (Experiment 626) is one of the two title characters of the Lilo & Stitch franchise. Originally an illegal genetic experiment created by mad alien scientist Dr. Jumba Jookiba to cause chaos across the galaxy, he is marked by his short temper and mischievous behavior (traits that endear him to his friend Lilo, who adopted him as her "dog"). He is voiced by his creator and the film's co-writer and co-director, Chris Sanders, in all official media, except the Stitch! anime and Stitch & Ai, where he is voiced by Ben Diskin.

=== Lilo Pelekai ===
Lilo Pelekai
- First appearance: Lilo & Stitch (2002)
- Created by: Chris Sanders
- Portrayed by: Maia Kealoha (2025 live-action film and its upcoming sequel)
- Voiced by: Daveigh Chase (first film, Stitch! The Movie, Lilo & Stitch: The Series, Leroy & Stitch, and video games; 2002–2006); Olivia DeLaurentis (additional lines in Lilo & Stitch: The Series, toys, and interactive games); Dakota Fanning (Lilo & Stitch 2: Stitch Has a Glitch); Tara Strong (adult in Lilo & Stitch: The Series); Melissa Fahn (child in the Stitch! anime); Gwendoline Yeo (adult in the Stitch! anime); Micah Aliling (Disney Speedstorm, Agent Stitch: The M-Files: Rise of the Mansquito); Maia Kealoha (Lilo & Scratch)
- Nicknames: Little Girl (by Jumba Jookiba); Weirdlo (by Mertle Edmonds)
- Occupation: Hula student (films, Lilo & Stitch: The Series); Ambassador for Earth in the United Galactic Federation (Leroy & Stitch); Caretaker of Dr. Jumba Jookiba's experiments (Leroy & Stitch)
- Family: Nani Pelekai (older sister and legal guardian; former legal guardian at the end of the live-action film); Unnamed, deceased parents; Stitch ("dog" and best friend); Jumba Jookiba (adoptive "uncle"; animated continuity); Wendy Pleakley (adoptive [male] "aunt" in the animated continuity; friend in the live-action film); David Kawena (friend in the animated continuity; foster father in the live-action film); Cobra Bubbles (friend); Ani (daughter; Stitch! anime series); Tūtū (foster grandparent; live-action film)

Lilo Pelekai (/ˈliːloʊ/ LEE-loh; literally 'lost' in Hawaiian) is one of the two title characters of the franchise. She is a young Native Hawaiian girl who lives on the island of Kauaʻi with her older sister Nani and her extended family of alien visitors marooned on Earth. She was voiced by Daveigh Chase in all the animated films and Lilo & Stitch: The Series, except Lilo & Stitch 2: Stitch Has a Glitch where she was voiced by Dakota Fanning due to scheduling conflicts on Chase's part. In the 2025 live-action film and its upcoming sequel, Lilo is portrayed by Maia Kealoha, who also voices the original animated version of the character in the 2026 short film Lilo & Scratch.

Lilo is a young girl with long, straight black hair and brown eyes. She is most often seen wearing a muʻumuʻu and sandals, but also wears other warm-weather clothing as well as traditional hula costumes. In Lilo & Stitch 2: Stitch Has a Glitch; her reflection in a mirror is compared to a picture of her young mother, suggesting that they look similar. In the episode "Skip" where an experiment (Experiment 089) is used to skip time ten then another ten years, it is mentioned that older Lilo looks a lot like her sister Nani.

Her spirited and highly eccentric personality, especially in light of her parents' death, has alienated her from her fellow children, yet Lilo makes the perfect best friend for Stitch, an alien experiment whom she adopts as her dog. Lilo attends hula school and her hobbies include the photography of tourists (especially obese people), talking about creatures from horror/sci-fi movies, and rehabilitating Jumba's experiments. In "Swapper", she meets Victoria, who turns out to have similar personalities to her and she becomes Lilo's only human friend.

Lilo is also known for being a passionate fan of Elvis Presley; this trait of hers is based on Lilo & Stitch director/writer Chris Sanders being a fan of Presley himself.

Lilo's parents died in a car accident some time before Lilo & Stitch (it is suggested that rain made road conditions treacherous), and they have not appeared in the series apart from three photographs: one of Lilo, Nani, and their parents having a picnic on the beach, a photograph of Lilo's mother winning the Hula contest at her school's May Day celebration, and a photo of Nani with her parents when she graduated to intermediate Hula.

Lilo's mother is depicted as kind and loving (and perhaps eccentric like her younger daughter), as well as an excellent hula dancer. She would placate her children by holding a family night, singing lullabies, and making up funny constellations. Lilo's father played the ukulele and was the one who coined the phrase ʻOhana means family, and family means nobody gets left behind or forgotten. Lilo loves and misses her parents very much; she keeps a picture of them under her pillow and initially would not allow Stitch to touch it.

The development of Lilo's ʻohana (extended family) begins with the adoption of Stitch in Lilo & Stitch. Though Lilo technically owns Stitch by Hawaiian state law, the relationship between the two is more like siblings and best friends. By the end of the series, Lilo's extended ʻohana includes Nani, Jumba and Pleakley, David, Cobra Bubbles, the Grand Councilwoman, Victoria, Jumba's experiments, and Mertle.

Lilo does not return as a main character in the Asian series Stitch! and Stitch & Ai. However, she appears as an adult in the third season of Stitch!. Lilo had gone to college and planned to meet Stitch on the beach when she returned, but when that day came, Nani was heavily pregnant and caused Lilo to be late. Stitch, for unknown reasons, was never aware of Nani's condition; when Lilo did not arrive at the time they planned, he thought she had forgotten about him. Before Lilo and her daughter leave Okinawa, Stitch arrives in time to see her again. They both have a happy reunion, she hugs him, promises to visit him again, and asks Stitch to take good care of his new family. She then gives Stitch his tiki necklace back before leaving.

Lilo is one of the several Disney Animation characters who appear in the short film Once Upon a Studio gathering for a group photo.

In the live-action film, Lilo is portrayed similarly to her animated counterpart, albeit with some notable changes. She gets expelled from her hālau hula after shoving Mertle Edmonds off the stage during a recital, is familiar with the animal shelter where she adopts Stitch (whereas she had not went there before in the original film), has a near-drowning experience after surfing with Nani and Stitch that leads to a hospital visit, saves Stitch from Jumba, and gets taken in by her next-door neighbors David Kawena and Tūtū after Nani relinquishes guardianship of her to pay for the hospital visit.

=== Nani Pelekai ===
Nani Pelekai
- First appearance: Lilo & Stitch (2002)
- Created by: Chris Sanders
- Portrayed by: Sydney Elizebeth Agudong (2025 film)
- Voiced by: Tia Carrere (2002–2006); Vanessa Marshall (Lilo & Stitch: Trouble in Paradise); Grey DeLisle (toddler in The Series episode "Baby-Fier"); Carolyn Omine (May the 12th Be with You)
- Occupation: Former lūʻau waitress (Lilo & Stitch 2002 and 2025 films); Surfboard rental clerk (sequel animated films and Lilo & Stitch: The Series); Surfing instructor (2025 film); College student (2025 film's epilogue)

Nani Pelekai is Lilo Pelekai's older sister and legal guardian. She carries the burden of supporting herself and her younger sister both financially and parentally. Naturally, she is usually very busy and under a great deal of stress. Her age is not made clear, but the fact that she was made her sister's guardian suggests that she is at least eighteen years old by the time of the first film. She loves Lilo devotedly but does not always understand her. Nani often serves as a gentle voice of reason and advice in the films and show—and occasionally, not so gentle. It was Nani, in the original film, who allowed Lilo to adopt Stitch from the pound, where he had been mistaken for a dog. She is voiced by Tia Carrere in the animated films and Lilo & Stitch: The Series, and portrayed by Sydney Elizebeth Agudong in the live-action film.

As a result of her stress, Nani is easily aggravated by Lilo and Stitch's antics, which often interfere with her ability to find and hold a stable job. In the original film, she loses her job as a waitress at a tourist-attracting lūʻau due to Stitch attacking a disguised Pleakley (who, along with Jumba, tried to capture Stitch there with an extraterrestrial chicken drumstick). She seemingly gets a new job at a store near her house after Jumba and Stitch's fight that ends with her house's destruction, although she is never seen working there afterward. In early season one of Lilo & Stitch: The Series and in Lilo & Stitch 2: Stitch Has a Glitch, she works as a clerk at a surfboard rental hut on Lahui Beach. However, partway through the season, she gets a new job for a similar position at the Birds of Paradise Hotel.

Nani appears as a playable character to unlock for a limited time in the video game Disney Magic Kingdoms.

Nani is one of the several Disney Animation characters who appear in the short film Once Upon a Studio gathering for a group photo.

In the live-action film, Nani is portrayed as a Type A person under considerable more stress than her animated counterpart. She is explicitly shown to have been a young professional surfer in the past (a detail which was only implied in the original film via trophies in her bedroom) and is shown to have graduated summa cum laude in high school. She was accepted into the marine biology program at the University of California, San Diego with a full scholarship, but put it aside to take care of Lilo. She struggles to keep the house clean and stocked with food, has overdue bills, and lacks health insurance for both herself and Lilo, and is ordered by her social worker Mrs. Kekoa to correct these issues. She also initially wasn't as accepting to have Lilo adopt a pet due to their ongoing issues, but her neighbor Tūtū convinces her to have Lilo keep Stitch. As with the original film, she loses her waitress job (this time due to Stitch accidentally causing a table fire), but is eventually able to find new employment as a surfing instructor. However, when she, Lilo, and Stitch go surfing after her first shift, Jumba and Pleakley try to capture Stitch, causing the three to wipe out and Lilo to have a near-drowning experience that leads to a hospital visit. Because Nani failed to enroll health insurance for Lilo beforehand, she is forced to make a deal with Mrs. Kekoa to relinquish guardianship in order to pay for the visit. However, Mrs. Kekoa later allows David and Tūtū to adopt Lilo to prevent the sisters' separation from being a major ordeal. Lilo also gives Nani her blessing to attend UCSD, which she does after rebuilding their damaged house. She continues to visit Lilo and Stitch whenever possible by using Jumba's portal-generating gun that they took from him to go from her dorm room in San Diego to Lilo's bedroom back at her family's house on Kauaʻi instantly.

=== Jumba Jookiba ===
Dr. Jumba Jookiba
- First appearance: Lilo & Stitch (2002)
- Created by: Chris Sanders
- Portrayed by: Zach Galifianakis (live-action film; human disguise)
- Voiced by: David Ogden Stiers (2002–2006, 2010); Jason Marsden (toddler); Jess Winfield (Stitch! anime and Stitch & Ai); Piotr Michael (Disney Speedstorm and Agent Stitch: The M-Files: Rise of the Mansquito); Zach Galifianakis (live-action film; alien form)
- Nickname: Evil Genius (self-proclaimed)
- Species: Kweltikwan / Quelte Quan
- Gender: Male
- Occupation: Biogeneticist; Engineer
- Spouse: Unnamed ex-wife

Dr. Jumba Jookiba (/ˌdʒʌmbə dʒuːˈkiːbə/ JUM-bə joo-KEE-bə, misspelled as Jumba Jukiba in some media) is the creator of Stitch and his "cousins." He is an overweight, purple-and-pink-skinned alien from the planet Kweltikwan/Quelte Quan speaking in a vaguely Russian accent (changed to an American accent in the live-action film), with dark pink skin and an ovalish head with four yellow eyes. He has been called an "idiot scientist", but he prefers to be known as an evil genius and is in fact very outgoing and kind-hearted outside of his work. He was voiced by David Ogden Stiers in the films, Lilo & Stitch: The Series, Disney's Stitch: Experiment 626, and Kingdom Hearts Birth by Sleep, The Series Jess Winfield in the Stitch! anime and Stitch & Ai, Piotr Michael in Disney Speedstorm and the audiobook Agent Stitch: The M-Files: Rise of the Mansquito, and Zach Galifianakis in the 2025 live-action film. Galifianakis also portrays Jumba in his human guise.

Jumba's greatest asset is his abnormally high IQ, hindered only by a few small and occasional lapses in memory. His penchant for creating numerous destructive, complex experiments and machinery is nearly unrivaled, and his creation 626 is proof of his genius, being nearly unbeatable, as well as one of the most formidable fighters in the galaxy. He has also completely memorized the number and technical info on every one of Stitch's "cousins" he created.

Jumba graduated from Evil Genius University with Jacques von Hämsterviel, his lab partner. Shortly afterward, it is said the two opened up a joke shop together. When Jumba became the lead scientist of Galaxy Defense Industries, the two began work on Jumba's experiments.

In the first film, Jumba is incarcerated, but later released and sent to Earth with Pleakley to recapture one of his creations, Experiment 626. He was later quietly left on Earth (likely to avoid becoming a nuisance elsewhere in the galaxy) and has become a part of Lilo's extended family. After Stitch suffers glitches due to his life energy depleting in Lilo & Stitch 2: Stitch Has a Glitch, Jumba builds a new fusion chamber to recharge him, although it seemingly fails until Lilo's love for Stitch revives him. In Lilo & Stitch: The Series, he assists the main duo in hunting down, capturing, and rehabilitating his genetic experiments. He is later rewarded for his efforts by getting access to his lab back in Leroy & Stitch, but by the end of the film, he willingly returns to be with Lilo and her ʻohana again.

Jumba also appears in the video games of the franchise and in other Disney crossover games, including Disney Friends, Kingdom Hearts Birth by Sleep, and Disney Magic Kingdoms.

Jumba is one of the several Disney Animation characters who appear in the short film Once Upon a Studio gathering for a group photo.

In the live-action film, Jumba is depicted in a more malevolent way and serves as the main antagonist of the film. While he still provides some comic relief, he is primarily portrayed without any of his animated counterpart's redeeming qualities. He is much more hostile towards Pleakley, hates humans, and belittles sentimental feelings, going as far as to damage Pelekais' house and their belongings on purpose after the Grand Councilwoman calls off her deal.

=== Pleakley ===
Pleakley
- First appearance: Lilo & Stitch (2002)
- Created by: Byron Howard; Chris Sanders
- Portrayed by: Billy Magnussen (live-action film; human disguise)
- Voiced by: Kevin McDonald; Tommy Widmer (toddler); Ted Biaselli (Stitch! anime); Lucien Dodge (Stitch & Ai); Billy Magnussen (live-action film; alien form); Sean Rohani (Agent Stitch: The M-Files: Rise of the Mansquito audiobook)
- Full name: Wendy Pleakley (animated continuity); Wendell Pleakley (live-action film)
- Species: Plorgonarian
- Gender: Male
- Title: Agent
- Occupation: Agent of the United Galactic Federation (former); Head of Earth Studies at Galactic Alliance Community College (Leroy & Stitch)
- Relatives: Unnamed mother; Unnamed father (Stitch!); Bertley Pleakley (brother; Lilo & Stitch: The Series and Leroy & Stitch); Pixley Pleakley (sister; Lilo & Stitch: The Series and Leroy & Stitch)

Agent Wendy Pleakley (Wendell Pleakley in the live-action film), usually referred to mononymously by his surname Pleakley, works for the United Galactic Federation, and acts as its expert on Earth, when in reality he does not know much. He reluctantly becomes Jumba's partner when forced to assist the scientist in capturing Stitch, then later becomes his best friend and roommate when the two are stranded on Earth. Pleakley is voiced by The Kids in the Hall veteran Kevin McDonald in all official Western media, Ted Biaselli in Stitch!, Lucien Dodge in Stitch & Ai, and Billy Magnussen in the live-action film. Magnussen also portrays Pleakley in his human disguise.

Pleakley is a thin, greenish-yellow alien with three stout legs, a wide mouth with two purple tongues (pink in the live-action film), three elongated fingers on each hand, a round bald head topped with a single small antenna that acts as ear and nose (which is actually dyed according to Experiment 199, Nosy, as it's turning prematurely orange), and one large eye in the middle of his face. His body shape and style of movement resembles the enchanted brooms from The Sorcerer's Apprentice sequence of Disney's Fantasia. Pleakley is shown to be effeminate and dresses in both men's and women's clothing and often wears a wig. He usually wears his Galactic Alliance uniform on official business and an orange muʻumuʻu while on Earth.

In "Poxy", much of the workings of Pleakley's internal system are revealed when Lilo and Stitch shrink themselves and enter it to retrieve an infectious experiment. He has no skeletal system and has an extremely small brain. In other episodes, his antenna is shown to be a sensory organ similar to a human nose and ear.

Pleakley also appears in the video games of the franchise, and in other Disney crossover games like Disney Friends and Disney Magic Kingdoms.

Pleakley is one of the several Disney Animation characters who appear in the short film Once Upon a Studio gathering for a group photo.

The live-action film's portrayal of Pleakley notably removes most of his effeminate aspects, including his cross-dressing (the closest to this being when he wears somewhat flowery clothing while disguised as human, as well as a shower cap while bathing in a hotel bathtub) and changing his given name from "Wendy" (which is an Earth feminine name, though is implied to be a masculine name on Plorgonar as it means "brave warrior" according to his mother) to "Wendell" (which is a masculine name). Regarding the cross-dressing removal, director Dean Fleischer Camp shared concept art of Pleakley wearing a dress, simply saying, "I tried."

=== Gantu ===
Gantu
- First appearance: Lilo & Stitch (2002)
- Created by: Chris Sanders
- Voiced by: Kevin Michael Richardson; Keith Silverstein (Stitch! anime); Richard Epcar (Stitch & Ai; uncredited)
- Species: Unspecified whale-like alien species
- Gender: Male
- Title: Captain
- Occupation: Captain of the Galactic Armada (Lilo & Stitch, the end of Leroy & Stitch, Stitch & Ai); Dr. Hämsterviel's henchman (Stitch! The Movie, Lilo & Stitch: The Series, most of Leroy & Stitch, Stitch! anime series)

Gantu (/ɡæn.tuː/, derived from "gargantuan"), known as Captain Gantu in Lilo & Stitch, the end of Leroy & Stitch, and Stitch & Ai, is an extremely large and muscular alien from the ice-covered eighth planet of the Kreplok System with a gruff, militant personality. He resembles a humanoid whale with gray skin, blue eyes, and pillar-like legs, and stands twenty feet tall. He is voiced by Kevin Michael Richardson in Western media, Keith Silverstein in Stitch!, and Richard Epcar in Stitch & Ai.

Gantu lacks any notable abilities, but his immense stature means he has strength well above any human. Aside from his lifting capacity and enormous girth, Gantu is a respected captain of the Galactic Federation and is a skilled pilot and marksman. In the first film, he is dispatched by the Grand Councilwoman to finish the job that Jumba and Pleakley failed to do. When the Grand Councilwoman and her soldiers arrived following Gantu's failure, the Grand Councilwoman retired Gantu.

In Stitch! The Movie, he is hired by Dr. Hämsterviel to retrieve Jumba's first 625 experiments and ends up getting Experiment 625 as his underling.

Throughout the following Lilo & Stitch: The Series, he works with 625 in an attempt to capture the experiments for Dr. Hämsterviel where his success at them is not large, with Lilo and Stitch successfully undoing all his work when they free the captured experiments in "Snafu". At one point, the Grand Councilwoman contacted Gantu and offered him his job back if he can help apprehend an escaped Dr. Hämsterviel. This deal was annulled when he unknowingly endangered Mertle.

In Leroy & Stitch, Gantu leaves Reuben and springs Dr. Hämsterviel from his prison where Dr. Hämsterviel creates Leroy. He later helps Lilo, Stitch, and a reformed 625 (now named "Reuben") thwart Dr. Hämsterviel and the clones of Leroy. Following the defeat of Dr. Hämsterviel and the Leroy clones, Gantu is reinstated in the Galactic Federation's armada, with Reuben becoming a galley officer.

Gantu also appears in the video games Kingdom Hearts Birth by Sleep, Disney Speedstorm, and Disney Magic Kingdoms.

Gantu is absent from the 2025 live-action film. Although initial versions of the film's script had him included, the film's director Dean Fleischer Camp saw him as too detached from the main characters to work with the plot. He was instead substituted with a more villainous Jumba.

=== Mertle Edmonds ===
Mertle Edmonds
- First appearance: Lilo & Stitch (2002)
- Created by: Chris Sanders
- Portrayed by: Emery Hookano-Briel (live-action film)
- Voiced by: Miranda Paige Walls (Lilo & Stitch, Lilo & Stitch: Trouble in Paradise); Liliana Mumy
- Full name: Mildred Pearl Edmonds
- Occupation: Hula student
- Family: Karl Edmonds (father); Mrs. Edmonds (mother); Gigi (pet)

Mildred Pearl "Mertle" Edmonds is Lilo's main rival. She is voiced by Miranda Paige Walls in the original film and Lilo & Stitch: Trouble in Paradise, then by Liliana Mumy in the following sequels and television series.

Mertle is established as a hālau hula classmate of Lilo's at the beginning of Lilo & Stitch, where she is introduced as a popular girl and the leader of a clique composed of herself and three other girls—Yuki, Elena, and Teresa—in the hālau. Mertle calls Lilo "Weirdlo" and refuses to include her in the girls' activities. Mertle and the other girls express fear and disgust of Lilo and her things, such as her doll Scrump and Stitch. Mertle takes great pleasure in putting down, insulting, bullying, and making fun of Lilo, in which Lilo sometimes responds (quite violently) by hitting her, pulling her hair, and biting her.

She became a recurring character in Lilo & Stitch: The Series. Throughout the series, it is established that she is from a relatively wealthy family and is a spoiled brat who lives with her mother. In the episode "Yapper", it is revealed that she adopted Experiment 007 as a pet, naming her "Gigi", but does not realize she is an experiment until Leroy & Stitch.

Mertle has a small role in the live-action film in which she is portrayed as much of a bully as her animated counterpart's portrayal in the sequel films and The Series. Unlike in The Series, which showed that her mother is single, both of her parents are still together in the film.

=== Cobra Bubbles ===
Cobra Bubbles
- First appearance: Lilo & Stitch (2002)
- Created by: Chris Sanders
- Portrayed by: Courtney B. Vance (live-action film)
- Voiced by: Ving Rhames (films; Experiment 300/Spooky disguised as Cobra in Lilo & Stitch: The Series); Terrence C. Carson (Lilo & Stitch: Trouble in Paradise); Kevin Michael Richardson (Lilo & Stitch: The Series); Richard Epcar (Stitch & Ai; uncredited)
- Occupation: Social worker (animated continuity); CIA agent (former in the animated continuity, active in the live-action film)

Cobra Bubbles is working as a social worker at the time of the original film. He is called to Nani's house to determine the fate of her guardianship over her sister Lilo, only to find Lilo home by herself, the front door nailed shut, and Nani trying to get in via the dog door. After a brief assessment, during which Lilo misinterprets Nani's hand signals, Cobra concludes that Nani is not doing a good enough job and gives her three days to change his mind. When Nani is fired because of Stitch's violent behavior, he informs her that he cannot ignore her being unemployed and demands her to get a new job as soon as possible. Cobra's subsequent encounter with Stitch also proves to be less than favorable. He is voiced in the films by Ving Rhames, in Lilo & Stitch: The Series by Kevin Michael Richardson, and in Stitch & Ai by an uncredited Richard Epcar.

Cobra is a former CIA agent and was involved in an incident at Roswell in 1973, presumably through which he knows the Grand Councilwoman. He mentions that he saved the Earth from an alien race by convincing them that the mosquito was endangered and that Earth should be turned into a wildlife preserve. When the Grand Councilwoman declares that Nani and Lilo are to be caretakers of Stitch during his exile on Earth, she also implies that Cobra Bubbles is not to divide but instead protect the family.

Cobra appears as a playable character to unlock for a limited time in the video game Disney Magic Kingdoms.

In the live-action film, Cobra Bubbles is depicted as solely being a CIA agent, with his status as a social worker in this adaptation merely being a cover-up. The new character of Mrs. Kekoa takes over the role of Nani and Lilo's social worker, while he goes undercover as Kekoa's new director. He and the Grand Councilwoman had never met before in this continuity, but he does promise her that he will keep alien society a secret from humans after they meet and she decides to exile Stitch on Earth. The film's mid-credits scene also reveals that he has befriended the Pelekai ʻohana.

=== Grand Councilwoman ===
Grand Councilwoman
- First appearance: Lilo & Stitch (2002)
- Created by: Chris Sanders
- Voiced by: Zoe Caldwell (2002–2006, 2010); Mary Elizabeth McGlynn (Stitch! anime series); Laura Post (Stitch & Ai); Hannah Waddingham (live-action film)
- Species: Unspecified alien species
- Occupation: Leader of the United Galactic Federation

The Grand Councilwoman is the leader of the United Galactic Federation (sometimes called the Galactic Alliance in Lilo & Stitch: The Series and its films). Others occasionally refer to her as "Your Majesty" and "Your Highness", and on the whole, she seems both reasonable and well-intentioned, although, like many members of the United Galactic Federation, she knows almost nothing about Earth or its inhabitants. She is of an unknown species by name, but she seems to be reminiscent of a grey alien, with hoof-shaped feet, big eyes, and a big head.

In Lilo & Stitch, the Grand Councilwoman was first seen in a council chamber with the other Galactic Leaders during the trial against Jumba. After asking Jumba's genetic creation, Experiment 626, if he could show some good in him, the Grand Councilwoman sentenced the Experiment to exile on a desert asteroid and Jumba to prison. However, 626 escapes in a police cruiser and she asks if it would be possible to just go to Earth and retrieve him. Pleakley tells her that the planet is a protected mosquito preserve and she later allows Pleakley and Jumba to retrieve 626. During the course of the film, the Councilwoman makes frequent calls to Pleakley, questioning what they are doing and why Experiment 626 has not been captured yet. In her last call to Pleakley, she loses patience and fires him and Jumba, sending Captain Gantu to finish the mission. At the end of the film, she finds that 626 (now named Stitch) found his own family and has changed for the better. She is reluctantly about to take Stitch to serve out his sentence when she learns that Lilo and Nani paid money for Stitch and therefore legally own him, giving the Councilwoman a legal loophole she could use. She happily allows him to stay with the Pelekais in exile on Earth and announces that the family is under the protection of the United Galactic Federation.

She makes limited appearances in the sequels (except for Lilo & Stitch 2) and spin-offs. In Stitch! The Movie, she assists Cobra Bubbles in arresting Dr. Hämsterviel during a prisoner swap with him, but her efforts were thwarted by Experiment 221 (Sparky) out of concern that the pods of the other experiments, which Hämsterviel had in his possession, would be destroyed in the process. After Lilo and Stitch cause the experiment pods to be scattered around Kauaʻi and capture Hämsterviel, the Councilwoman initially says that Earth would have evacuated and the experiment destroyed, but she's persuaded to let Lilo and Stitch hunt down the experiments and rehabilitate them. The Councilwoman returns in "Finder" (the only episode of The Series in which she appears) offering Gantu to have his old job back if he captures an escaped Hämsterviel, but rescinds the offer after he accidentally captured another innocent (Mertle). In Leroy & Stitch, she holds a ceremony congratulating Lilo, Stitch, Jumba, and Pleakley in capturing and rehabilitating the first 624 experiments, giving the aliens rewards and designating Lilo as the experiments' caretaker. After Hämsterviel takes over the Galactic Federation/Alliance with the help of his Leroy army, he demotes the Councilwoman to serve as his secretary. Upon Hämsterviel and Leroy's defeat and arrest, the Councilwoman holds another ceremony where she lets Stitch, Jumba, and Pleakley return to Earth to live with Lilo again, restores Gantu's post as captain of the Galactic Armada, and permits Reuben to be Gantu's galley officer.

In Stitch!, she first appears in the second season finale "Experiment Zero", where she informs Stitch of a major threat from a cyborg experiment known as Zero, and gives Stitch the equipment and spacecraft needed to face off against Zero. She then appears in the third season, informing Jumba and Pleakley in the season premiere "New Town" about Jumba's experiments that he left in the Galactic Federation's care being stolen from them, with the spaceship of the season's antagonist Delia having been seen recently, and again in the season finale "Dark-End" where she has Delia arrested after her experiment Dark End gets defeated by Stitch. She also appears in both post-season specials Stitch and the Planet of Sand and Stitch! Perfect Memory.

In Stitch & Ai, the Councilwoman is first seen in the third episode "Gotcha!" (after a cameo at the end of the preceding episode "Teacher's Pet"), informing Jumba and Pleakley about the Jaboodies and the Woolagongs going after Stitch for his "metamorphosis program", ordering the two to rescue Stitch under the threat of imprisonment doing hard labor. At the end of the following episode, "The Scroll", after Jumba and Pleakley inform the Councilwoman about Stitch finding a new home with Wang Ai Ling and Wang Jiejie, she permits Jumba and Pleakley to let Stitch stay with the Wang sisters under the condition of the two aliens staying to watch over him. She appears one more time in the eleventh episode "Nuo Opera", where Cobra Bubbles informs her of Jumba having made new experiments that are causing mischief, leading her to decide that she, Gantu, and the Galactic Federation need to intervene and stop them, but Cobra later informs her to call off the operation after having seen that Stitch made them behave and discovering that Jumba has been sending his newest experiments off to a pocket dimension.

The Grand Councilwoman's appearance in the 2025 live-action film is mostly identical to her 2002 animated film portrayal. Compared to her animated portrayal, she's more sarcastic, more willing to vaporize Earth to stop Stitch, and has not met Cobra Bubbles before, although when they do meet, he promises to keep alien society hidden from Earth's inhabitants. She also arrests the film's more villainous Jumba after he fails to capture Stitch within 48 hours and lets Stitch serves his exile on Earth without needing to use a legal loophole.

The Grand Councilwoman also appears in the video game Kingdom Hearts Birth by Sleep.

=== David Kawena ===
David Kawena
- First appearance: Lilo & Stitch (2002)
- Created by: Chris Sanders
- Portrayed by: Kaipo Dudoit (live-action film)
- Voiced by: Jason Scott Lee (Lilo & Stitch and Lilo & Stitch 2: Stitch Has a Glitch); Dee Bradley Baker (Stitch! The Movie and Lilo & Stitch: The Series)
- Occupation: Fire performer; Surfer; Lifeguard (live-action film)
- Significant other: Nani Pelekai (girlfriend)

David Kawena is Nani's boyfriend. He is voiced by Jason Scott Lee in the original film and Lilo & Stitch 2: Stitch Has a Glitch and Dee Bradley Baker in Lilo & Stitch: The Series and its films, while Kaipo Dudoit portrayed him in the live-action film. He is a great surfer who works as a fire performer at the luau where Nani also previously worked in the first film and the live-action film, the latter which also gives him a second job as a lifeguard. Very easygoing, he is a close and supportive friend to both Pelekai sisters, having helped them out several times.

David is one of the several Disney Animation characters who appear in the short film Once Upon a Studio gathering for a group photo.

David appears as a playable character to unlock for a limited time in the video game Disney Magic Kingdoms.

=== Mrs. Hasagawa ===
Mrs. Hasagawa
- First appearance: Lilo & Stitch (2002)
- Created by: Chris Sanders
- Voiced by: Amy Hill
- Full name: Lynne Hasagawa
- Occupation: Fruit seller

Lynne Hasagawa, usually referred to as Mrs. Hasagawa, is a little old lady with grey hair and wears glasses, and is the owner of the town's fruit stand. In the episode "Mrs. Hasagawa's Cats", she obtains and activates several experiments who she believes to be cats. She does not appear in the live-action film, although her voice actress Amy Hill portrays a new character named Tūtū to replace her.

=== Other characters ===
- Moses Puloki: Lilo's hula teacher. He is very patient with his young students and is very tolerant of their antics. However, he is often exasperated by the way Mertle and her friends disrespect Lilo. Lilo and her classmates often call Moses "Kumu", Hawaiian for teacher. Lilo oddly calls him "Mr. Petuli" in the Lilo & Stitch: The Series episode "Cannonball", though she later refers to him by his given name Moses in the same episode. He is voiced by Kunewa Mook, who is a kumu hula in real life. In the live-action film, in which he is only credited as "Kumu Hula" and is portrayed by Brutus Labenz, he expels Lilo from his hālau hula after she shoves Mertle off the stage during a recital.
- Elena, Teresa, and Yuki: They are three girls that always accompany Mertle and mock Lilo with her. They usually travel in a group and usually say a drawn-out, sarcastic "Yeah!" in unison when agreeing with Mertle on something. The three have very few distinguishing personality traits, with The Series showing Yuki having an interest in ice hockey and implying that Teresa has an interest in technology. Elena is voiced by Jillian Henry and Yuki is voiced by Lili Ishida, while Teresa is voiced by Kali Whitehurst in Stitch! The Movie, The Series, and Leroy & Stitch, and Holliston Coleman in Lilo & Stitch 2. In the live-action film, in which they are not named, they are portrayed by Elle Hipa, Arianna Jordan Ignacio Acidera, and Aubrey Rose Madarang.
- Rescue Lady: The operator of Aloha Animal Rescue, Kokaua Town's animal shelter where Lilo adopts Stitch. She has red hair and wears glasses and green overalls. Her real name, according to Lilo's pink slip showing her ownership of Stitch, is Susan Hegarty, which is the name of the vocal coach who voiced her in the original film. She also makes brief appearances in three episodes of Lilo & Stitch: The Series, voiced by Grey DeLisle. In the live-action film, she is renamed AJ and is a young woman portrayed by Celia Kenney. AJ is familiar with Lilo, with Lilo having visited the shelter before, and forces her to surrender candy that she intended to feed the dogs with so they don't get diarrhea.
- Ice Cream Man: An unnamed, obese man with sunglasses, swimming trunks (shorts and an aloha shirt in most episodes of The Series), sandals, and a sunburn around his body except for an area on his torso where he wore an A-shirt. He is a running gag throughout the Lilo & Stitch franchise. Whenever he appears, he drops his ice cream from its cone before he can finish it. This character has never spoken in the series except saying "Whoa!" when he tripped over a pod. He also cries after being turned into a baby by Experiment 151 (Babyfier). His real eyes can be seen in "Swirly". He is normally silent but was voiced, briefly, by Frank Welker. In the live-action film, he is a Native Hawaiian instead of a white tourist, and he tries to enjoy Hawaiian shave ice instead of ice cream. He is credited as "Big Hawaiian Dude" as a result of these changes and is played by David Hekili Kenui Bell; the remake was Bell's final acting role that was released while he was alive.
- Luki: A shave ice business owner and vendor who appeared briefly in the original film and in Stitch's nightmare in the opening of Lilo & Stitch 2, and a few times in Lilo & Stitch: The Series. In the original film and Lilo & Stitch 2, he is Caucasian with brown hair, but The Series changes his appearance to be Polynesian with black hair. In the series, he is voiced by Steve Prince.
- Pudge: An orange tropical saltwater fish who Lilo believes to have control over the weather. She feeds him a peanut butter sandwich every Thursday to "appease" him. Normally a bit character, he only appears a few times in the animated canon, although he is eventually focused on in Lilo & Scratch (2026), in which he is shown living with the Pelekais and Stitch has to defend him from being eaten by an alien cat. He also appears and is focused on in the non-canon Chibi Tiny Tales episode "All Hail Pudge!", in which he is depicted as sapient and with actual weather manipulation powers. In the live-action film, he appears to be a pufferfish, and he eats a sandwich that Lilo makes with lettuce and tomato instead of peanut butter.

== Characters introduced in Stitch: Experiment 626 ==
=== Chopsuey (X-621) ===
Experiment 621
- First appearance: Disney's Stitch: Experiment 626 (2002)
- Voiced by: Frank Welker
- Nickname: Chopsuey (according to Leroy & Stitch)
- Species: Extraterrestrial genetic experiment
- Gender: Male

Chopsuey (Experiment 621) is one of Stitch's "cousins". A green, skinny Stitch look-alike with a spiky yellow Mohawk and two prominent fangs jutting from his lower jaw, he has all of Stitch's powers and is jealous of all the attention 626 (Stitch) gets. He secretly strikes out on his own collecting DNA for himself and using it to mutate to a taller form, which gives him bulging eyes, in a failed attempt to defeat 626 and win over Jumba. He was voiced by Frank Welker. He was only known by his experiment number in the game; he was given the name "Chopsuey" in the experiments list seen in the end credits of Leroy & Stitch. The PlayStation 2 game remains his only physical appearance to date, although the 2026 reference book Stitch: Alien Experiment Character Guide confirms that his original appearance remains canonical in the subsequent franchise since the game's release.

=== Dr. Habbitrale ===
Dr. Habbitrale
- First appearance: Disney's Stitch: Experiment 626 (2002)
- Last appearance: Lilo & Stitch (2002) (silhouetted cameo)
- Voiced by: James Arnold Taylor
- Full name: Albert Habbitrale
- Species: Unspecified rodent-like alien species
- Gender: Male

Dr. Albert Habbitrale is one of many rivals of Dr. Jumba Jookiba. He shares a similar appearance to Hämsterviel, appearing to be of the same rodent-like alien species as him. He was voiced by James Arnold Taylor in the game. Habbitrale also cameos in the original Lilo & Stitch film as a prisoner whose appearance is mostly in silhouette; his identity is confirmed through model sheets made for the film (which is also the source of his given name Albert), but he is not mentioned and is often mistaken to be Hämsterviel instead.

== Characters introduced in Stitch! The Movie ==
=== Dr. Hämsterviel ===
Dr. Jacques von Hämsterviel
- First appearance: Stitch! The Movie (2003)
- Last appearance: Stitch! Perfect Memory (2015; last major animated appearance); "Gotcha!", Stitch & Ai (2017; last animated cameo appearance)
- Voiced by: Jeff Bennett; Kirk Thornton (Stitch! anime)
- Full name: Rupert Jacques von Hämsterviel
- Aliases: Dr. Gunther Freem (human disguise in The Series episode "Bad Stitch"); Hämjock Vielvonster (human alter ego in the anime episode of the same name)
- Nicknames: Hamsterwheel (common mispronunciation); Milton (Mertle Edmonds's pet name for him); Gerbil Boy (by Stitch)
- Species: Unspecified rodent-like alien species
- Occupation: Scientist

Dr. Jacques von Hämsterviel (/ˈhɑːmstərviːl/ HAHM-stər-veel) is voiced by Jeff Bennett in Lilo & Stitch: The Series and its films Stitch! The Movie and Leroy & Stitch, while Kirk Thornton voiced him in the Stitch! anime. Hämsterviel is a diminutive rat-like alien scientist who desires to conquer the galaxy. The former lab partner of Jumba, he now seeks to capture the experiments he helped create.

In the Stitch! anime series, Hämsterviel is seen out of prison residing in a laboratory hideout on an asteroid, with Gantu and Reuben working for him again. He now goes out in the open more often to fight against Stitch and his new friend Yuna. He also has a number of experiments in his possession and often sends them out to fight for him; he states in an episode of the English dub that he kidnapped them from Kauaʻi and reverted them back to evil using a recording of Angel's siren song. Additionally, during the anime, primarily its third season ~Best Friends Forever~, he "transmutates" a number of experiments to enhance or change their abilities.

Hämsterviel makes costumed character appearances at Tokyo Disneyland and occasionally at Disneyland Paris. He also appeared in a 2014 Disney Villains-themed event at Walt Disney World called "Villains Unleashed" alongside Gantu.

=== Reuben (X-625) ===
Reuben
- First appearance: Comic Zone: Disney's Lilo & Stitch (early version); Stitch! The Movie (2003; canonical debut)
- Voiced by: Rob Paulsen; Dave Wittenberg (Stitch! anime series)
- Alias: Experiment 625
- Species: Extraterrestrial genetic experiment
- Gender: Male
- Occupation: Galley officer for the Galactic Armada (the end of Leroy & Stitch); Gantu's sidekick
- Abilities: Identical abilities to Stitch (see that character's infobox on his article for more information); "Advanced language programming" allowing for fluent English speech; Retractable claws and lower pair of arms; Skilled sandwich making

Reuben (Experiment 625) is one of the experiments created by Jumba, and one of Stitch's cousins. Reuben has every ability Stitch has (along with a much better fluency in English, speaking with a Brooklyn accent) but he prefers to make sandwiches than use his powers. He is voiced by Rob Paulsen in the films and Lilo & Stitch: The Series, and by Dave Wittenberg in the Stitch! anime's English dub. Although the character's canonical debut was in Stitch! The Movie, he first appeared in prequel comics published in Disney Adventures before the release of the original film.

Reuben makes occasional costumed character appearances at Disney Parks, usually in events along with several other experiments. He made an appearance in Lilo & Stitch's Big Panic on a float with the villains of his franchise. He made an extremely brief, non-speaking cameo appearance in Stitch's Great Escape! at the Magic Kingdom. Reuben appears as a playable character to unlock for a limited time in the video game Disney Magic Kingdoms. He also makes a cameo appearance in the climax of the 2025 live-action film as a holographic image on a monitor in Jumba's ship.

=== Sparky (X-221) ===
Sparky
- First appearance: Stitch! The Movie (2003)
- Voiced by: Frank Welker; Steven Blum (Stitch! anime series)
- Alias: Experiment 221
- Species: Extraterrestrial genetic experiment
- Gender: Male
- Occupation: Lighthouse operator
- Abilities: Electricity manipulation and generation; Transportation through electrical sources; Flight; Retractable lower pair of arms

Sparky (Experiment 221) is one of the experiments created by Jumba, and one of Stitch's cousins. He can control electricity and move around with it as a method of propulsion, sometimes causing short circuits. He is voiced by Frank Welker, while he is voiced by Steven Blum in the anime's dubbed version. His "one true place" is a disused lighthouse on Kauai, which he can power up for full operation.

Sparky also appears as an enemy in the video game Kingdom Hearts Birth by Sleep, which takes place before the events of the first film. He has also made costumed character appearances in Disney Parks, usually in events with other experiments.

=== Jumba's genetic experiments (Stitch's cousins) ===
Genetic experiments
- Lilo & Stitch race
- First appearance: Notable debuts: Comic Zone: Lilo & Stitch (2002; initial debut of the experiments in general, including X-625/Reuben); Disney's Stitch: Experiment 626 (2002; X-621/Chopsuey); Lilo & Stitch (2002; X-626/Stitch's official debut); Stitch! The Movie (2003; canonical debut of the experiments in general, X-221/Sparky and X-625/Reuben's official debut)
- Last appearance: "Stitch! Perfect Memory"; Stitch!; 2015 (last in-universe appearance of any of the first 625 experiments)
- Created by: Chris Sanders (basis for the concept of genetic experiments via Stitch); Jess Winfield (Leroy); Tony Craig (experiments introduced in Stitch! The Movie, Lilo & Stitch: The Series, and Leroy & Stitch)

In-universe information
- Other name: Experiments
- Created by: Dr. Jumba Jookiba; Dr. Jacques von Hämsterviel (funder)
- Home world: Turo ("birth" planet for first 626 experiments and Leroy); Earth ("one true place" for most experiments; Experiment 627's "birth" planet); Plorgonar (X-254/Mr. Stenchy's "one true place")
- Base of operations: Kokaua Town, Hawaii (most experiments); Kilauea Point, Hawaii (X-221/Sparky)
- Type: Genetically engineered alien mutants
- Language: Tantalog; English (select experiments, including X-625/Reuben); French (X-062/Frenchfry); Spanish (X-123/Carmen)
- Affiliation: Pelekai ʻohana
- Leader: Lilo Pelekai (official caretaker as designated by the United Galactic Federation in Leroy & Stitch)
- Notable members: Stitch (X-626); Reuben (X-625); Angel (X-624); Sparky (X-221); Chopsuey (X-621); Leroy (X-629)

The genetic experiments (or simply experiments) are genetically engineered alien creatures created by Jumba Jookiba who are featured throughout the franchise, of which Stitch (Experiment 626) is among them. The experiments, made by Jumba with funding provided by his former partner-in-crime Jacques von Hämsterviel, were primarily designed for causing evil deeds in a variety of forms, ranging from mere annoyances to planetary destruction. Although at least one of them have technically appeared in virtually every Lilo & Stitch-related media—mainly through Stitch—the collective experiments were only a main focus in Lilo & Stitch: The Series (and its pilot and finale films) and the Stitch! anime series. The experiments, in general, were first introduced in the Lilo & Stitch prequel comics shown in Disney Adventures magazine and in the PlayStation 2 prequel video game Disney's Stitch: Experiment 626, which were released before the original film's theatrical release, but they did not make their official debut in the animated continuity until Stitch! The Movie.

The pronunciation of each experiment's number is typically by digit (e.g. Stitch is "Experiment Six-Two-Six"), with the only known exceptions being those whose numbers are divisible by 100 (e.g. Spooky is "Experiment Three Hundred"). According to some episodes of Lilo & Stitch: The Series and the "wanted posters" in the exit halls of Stitch's Great Escape!, the official abbreviation of "Experiment" (when referring to a specific one of such) is "X-" (X with a hyphen); in this format, Stitch's number would be abbreviated as "X-626" (pronounced as "ex six-two-six").

The experiments serve as the main plot devices of Lilo & Stitch: The Series, where Lilo and Stitch have to find the experiments (who are initially shown as dehydrated pods that are activated in water), capture them, name them, and rehabilitate them by putting them in occupations where they can use their abilities to help out society (referred to by Lilo as the places where they truly belong or "one true places"). Stitch, inspired by Hawaiian terminology, refers to nearly all of his fellow experiments as his "cousins" (Angel, his girlfriend, being the lone exception) and considers them all a part of his ʻohana. The original 626 numbered experiments, ranging from X-001/Shrink to X-626/Stitch, had their given names shown alongside Leroy & Stitch's credits, albeit with some errors just as the accidental exclusion of Tickle-Tummy (Experiment 275).

About 100 experiments were designed for Lilo & Stitch: The Series, which initially was not intended to feature the other 625 experiments made before Stitch. Lilo & Stitch: The Series executive producer Jess Winfield stated that during the show's development, Walt Disney Television Animation artist and director Steve Lyons suggested that Lilo and Stitch would hunt down various creatures that a villain would make from cloning Stitch. Over time, the idea of the Stitch clones would change to the 625 experiments before Stitch after someone else suggested them instead. Winfield did not remember who first thought up of the idea of using the other 625 experiments, although he believed it was either himself, fellow executive producer Bobs Gannaway, or then-president of Walt Disney Television Animation Barry Blumberg.

Stitch & Ai—which does not feature any of the original experiments besides Stitch—features an entirely new set of experiments based on creatures from Chinese mythology.

An official reference book on the experiments, Stitch: Alien Experiment Character Guide, was published on November 1, 2026, in Australia and New Zealand by Scholastic Australia. It features information and new artwork on all of the 127 fully-known genetic experiments from throughout the entire franchise.

==== List of experiments ====
Since the majority of experiments were never seen, this list will only focus on those who made significant appearances in official Lilo & Stitch media, such as having been a featured experiment on an episode of Lilo & Stitch: The Series and/or Stitch!, making multiple recurring appearances, or having a spoken role.

- X-001/Shrink – A small, purple, three-legged, levitating experiment who can fire a ray to change the sizes of objects and creatures. Unvoiced in his first appearances, he was voiced by Keith Silverstein in the anime episode "Experiment-a-palooza".
- X-002/Doubledip – A purple opossum-like experiment designed to double-dip food. He lives with Mrs. Hasagawa as one of her "cats".
- X-007/Gigi – A white Shih Tzu-like experiment designed to annoy people with her constant barking. She was found and adopted by Mertle Edmonds, who named her "Gigi", as her "dog"; Lilo nicknamed the experiment "Yapper", hence the title of that episode. In Leroy & Stitch, she is revealed to be capable of speaking English. She was voiced by Tress MacNeille.
- X-010/Felix – A green anteater/elephant-like experiment who is designed to be Jumba's cleaner, but was too obsessed with cleanliness. A re-programming to fix this flaw made him obsessed with dirtiness instead, with Lilo calling him "an Oscar". Both of his names are references to the lead characters of The Odd Couple. Felix also appears as a playable character in Disney Stitch Jam and a costumed character in Disney Parks, usually in events with other experiments.
- X-020/Slick – A pink, fast-talking, Southern-accented experiment who is designed to be an effective salesperson who is able to sell anything to anyone. His "one true place" is to serve as a fundraiser for charity. He was voiced by Jeff Bennett.
- X-022/Hertz Donut – A green seahorse-like experiment who can confine others by firing toruses at them, preventing them from moving. He was introduced in the Stitch! anime.
- X-025/Topper – A small, yellow, star-shaped experiment who is designed to be a beacon to signal an alien attack fleet, although the official Disney website previously stated his purpose is to keep people awake with his bright light. He is given to a little girl as a Christmas present. His number refers to Christmas Day (December 25).
- X-029/Checkers – A yellow and purple caterpillar-like experiment that sits curled up like a crown on people's heads, making whoever wears them a ruler who hypnotizes people around them (except higher-numbered experiments). The victims retain their normal personality while under its control, and the effect immediately wears off once Checkers is removed. His "one true place" is serving as a decorative crown for festivals. He was unvoiced in The Series but was voiced in the anime by Dave Wittenberg.
- X-032/Fibber – A small, orange, large-headed, four-eared experiment who is designed to detect lies. If he hears someone tell a lie, he buzzes loudly and the marking on his forehead glows. He was voiced by Jeff Bennett.
- X-033/Hammerface, also known as Hammerhead – A blue-gray dinosaur-like experiment who is designed to drive in nails around Jumba's house with his hammer-shaped head/face, but at times he will pound living things. He was voiced by Jeff Bennett in The Series and Steve Blum in the anime.
- X-040/Backhoe – A gray mole-like experiment with large black claws. He is an efficient digger designed to scrape up vegetation.
- X-054/Fudgy – A blob-like experiment made of chocolate who is designed to drown people in his sticky sweetness. In the Stitch! anime, Fudgy was modified by Hämsterviel to grow larger in size by eating chocolate. He was voiced by Rob Paulsen in The Series and Dave Wittenberg in the anime.
- X-062/Frenchfry – A small, grey and white, French-speaking, chef-like experiment who was designed to be Jumba's personal chef, instantly preparing food for him. However, 062 made unhealthy foods that quickly made people fat, then he ate the fattened victims. He stopped when he learned that healthy foods could be just as delicious, and would open a healthy French fry hut as his "one true place". He was voiced by Rob Paulsen in The Series and Dave Wittenberg in the anime.
- X-074/Welko – A pink balloon dog-like experiment who can generate indestructible bubbles. She was introduced in the Stitch! anime, where she was voiced by Stephanie Sheh.
- X-089/Skip – A small purple hourglass-shaped experiment who was designed to skip time by ten minutes, but an error in his programming causes him to skip time by ten years instead. Skip has a reset button on top of his head that reverses time back to when his ability was first activated. He was voiced by Jeff Bennett.
- X-110/Squeak – A small red mouse-like experiment who is designed to annoy entire planets by talking ceaselessly. His appearance and ability is a reference to the Looney Tunes character Sniffles. He was voiced by Rob Paulsen in The Series and Roger Craig Smith in the anime, the latter which also calls him "Squeaky" in the English dub.
- X-112/Toons – A yellow platypus-like experiment with an orange mane and a rectangular vacuum-like mouth who can bring 2D images to life by consuming a 2D subject and spitting it back out, making it 3D. He was introduced in the Stitch! anime.
- X-113/Shoe – A green and white sloth-like experiment with horseshoe-like horns who can control luck. His "one true place" is at a golf course, where he makes people score holes-in-one.
- X-120/Snafu – A small, teal, octopus-like experiment who is designed to foil enemy plans by any possible means. He is named after the military acronym SNAFU.
- X-122/Dorkifier – A pink and white calf-like experiment who is designed to fire a ray from his horns that changes his victims' appearance into something ridiculous. He was introduced in the Stitch! anime.
- X-123/Carmen – A pink, four-armed experiment who resembles Angel and wields four maracas. She is designed to make people dance until they drop by firing pink energy balls out of her maracas at victims. She first cameoed in Leroy & Stitch and later made a full appearance in the Stitch! anime, voiced by Kari Wahlgren.
- X-128/Bugby – A green, mosquito-like experiment who was designed to turn whole civilizations into harmless insects. Anyone turned into an insect can understand all other insects and arachnids. The only way to reverse the effect is with a machine built by Jumba. Bugby was later reprogrammed to only turn inanimate objects into insects. His "one true place" is helping farmers by creating ladybugs, who eat aphids.
- X-133/PJ – An orange and tan koala-like experiment with a red nose and a functioning blowhorn for a tail (reminiscent of Harpo Marx's trademark horn) which he squeaks instead of speaking. He normally wears Groucho Marx glasses. He is designed to play practical jokes on people, hence his name P(ractical) J(oker). His "one true place" is as an opening act for Moses's hula gig. PJ is seen without his glasses in Leroy & Stitch during the "Aloha ʻOe" concert and in the group photo taken at the end of the film. He was voiced by Jeff Bennett in The Series and Roger Craig Smith in the anime.
- X-145/Bragg – A yellow, long-eared, cat/rabbit-like experiment introduced in the Stitch! anime who is designed to play music (primarily the flute, which leads to Yuna naming him "Flute" in the English dub) from Jumba's home planet, growing and increasing his strength through the sympathy he receives from his music. However, he also grows meaner and uglier the more powerful he gets. He was transmutated by Dr. Hämsterviel, as he was originally dark green, bigger, and uglier before being made cuter. He was voiced by Ben Diskin.
- X-149/Bonnie and X-150/Clyde – A small, green, female, koala-like experiment and a large, yellow-brown, male, bear-like experiment with a cybernetic left arm, respectively. They are designed to work together to steal things, with Bonnie acting as the brains and Clyde as the brawn. They are named after the famous criminal couple of Bonnie and Clyde. Bonnie was voiced in The Series and Leroy & Stitch by Tress MacNeille, and in the anime by Mary Elizabeth McGlynn. Clyde was voiced in all his appearances by Rocky McMurray.
- X-151/Babyfier – A small, pink, infantile, koala/fairy-like experiment with a long baby rattle-shaped tail. He is designed to people into babies with a pink powder shaken from his tail, the effects of which can only be reversed with a specific antidote. His "one true place" is at the animal shelter making older dogs young again, thus making them more appealing to potential adopters. In Stitch!, he was reprogrammed by Hämsterviel to turn people into toddlers instead of babies and was renamed "Toddler-fier". He was voiced by Tara Strong in The Series and Laura Bailey in the anime.
- X-158/Finder – A red aardvark/shrew-like experiment who is designed to find anything at the request of someone. He honks when he finds what he's looking for, and can fly by spinning his ears like helicopter blades. His "one true place" is operating a Lost and Found service on Lahui Beach. He is voiced by Frank Welker.
- X-177/Clip – A small, yellow hairball-like experiment with long scissor-like claws who was designed to eat an efficient, cheap, and abundant intergalactically used fuel called "uburnium" to create a fuel crisis. However, in Jumba's native language, the word "uburnium" closely resembles the word for "hair", so she eats hair instead of the fuel. Her "one true place" is cutting hair at Kokaua Town's beauty salon. She was voiced in The Series by Tress MacNeille and in the anime by Michelle Ruff.
- X-199/Nosy – A red, large-nosed, wombat/pig-like experiment who is designed to seek out and reveal people's most embarrassing secrets, though it's usually useless gossip. He was voiced in The Series by Bobcat Goldthwait and in the anime by Roger Craig Smith.
- X-204/Nosox – A gray experiment shaped like a four-legged washing machine who is designed to make socks disappear. He was voiced by Ben Diskin in the anime.
- X-210/Retro – A small orange mammalian/reptilian dinosaur-like experiment who is designed to turn enemy weapons, technology, animals and even people and other objects into their most primitive state by wrapping his tongue around them. His "one true place" is making a prehistoric zoo. He was voiced by Frank Welker in The Series and Dave Wittenberg in the anime.
- X-214/Pix – A blue camera-like experiment with three legs that are similar to a tripod. He is designed to take only bad pictures of people, taking pictures with his lens-like "nose" and developing instant photos that come out of his mouth. He lives with Mrs. Hasagawa as one of her "cats". He also appears in the anime, voiced by Ted Biaselli.
- X-221/Sparky – A yellow dragon/gecko-like experiment with electrical abilities.
- X-222/Poxy – A green, germ-like experiment who is designed to transmit disease to popular planetary leaders and disable them. His "one true place" is never shown, but is revealed to be curing disease in the Lilo & Stitch 2: Stitch Has a Glitch DVD. He was voiced by Frank Welker.
- X-223/Glitch – A bright green experiment that resembles a cross between Morpholomew (X-316) and Poxy (X-222). He is designed to turn technology against its user by entering machines and electronics and making them malfunction. Lilo tricked him into being downloaded into her video game, which became his "one true place" by rendering the games harder. He was voiced by Frank Welker.
- X-228/Melty – A red, dragon-like experiment who is designed to melt enemy fortresses, weapons, and transportation, among other things, with the bright blue blasts from his mouth. His "one true place" is burning metal at a recycling plant. He was voiced by Frank Welker.
- X-234/Shush – A reddish-pink opossum/mouse-like experiment with a speaker at the end of its tail who is designed to eavesdrop on enemy conversations. Shush's "one true place" is with Cobra Bubbles as a CIA operative.
- X-248/Belle – A small cyan experiment with a pitchfork-shaped head who is designed to scare people with a loud high-pitched shriek. Her "one true place" is serving as Nani's alarm clock. She was voiced by Tara Strong.
- X-251/Link – A yellow, rabbit-like experiment with red eyes and striped antennae that shoots light blue slimy glue. He is designed to bind together incompatible individuals, usually by the hand or wrist. The slime is easily washed off with mud. His "one true place" is helping couples reconcile by bungee jumping. He was voiced in the anime by Keith Silverstein.
- X-254/Mr. Stenchy and X-255/Mrs. Sickly – Two identical-looking, irresistibly cute and fluffy experiments with round heads, big eyes, and small pudgy bodies. They can respectively generate noxious and sweet scents. Stenchy's "one true place" is on Pleakley's home planet of Plorgonar, where his stench is considered a rare and valuable perfume. Stenchy was voiced in The Series by Frank Welker and the Stitch! anime by Kari Wahlgren, while Sickly, who only appears in the Stitch! anime, was voiced by Michelle Ruff.
- X-258/Sample – An orange, koala/cat-like experiment with a big round nose that functions as a microphone, and big round ears resembling speakers. He is designed to annoy enemies by looping random sounds with his mouth or his ears. His "one true place" is providing backbeats for the band Fox Roswell. In the Stitch! anime, he was modified by Hämsterviel to cause others to dance uncontrollably and can also speak independently with a filtered voice (provided by Dave Wittenberg). He has also appeared as a costumed character in Disney Parks, usually in events with other experiments.
- X-262/Ace – A red, koala-like experiment with four arms, super strength, and fire breath. He has one fatal error: he has no evil function; a failed experiment that is pure good, and to top it off, he is the only experiment programmed not to cause trouble. His "one true place" is balancing out Jumba's evil and acting as a local do-gooder. He was voiced in the anime by Troy Baker.
- X-267/Wishy-Washy – A pudgy lavender-bluish teddy bear-like experiment with fairy-like wings who is designed to grant any wish he hears, but the wishes are granted in a literal manner. He also has a wish limit that cannot be extended by wishing for more wishes. He was voiced in The Series by Rob Paulsen, in the anime episode "We Wishy You a Washy Christmas" by Derek Stephen Prince, and in the anime episode "Stitch Goes to Wishlanda" by Roger Craig Smith.
- X-272/Wormhole – A purple and cyan caterpillar-like experiment who can generate wormholes to other universes. He was voiced by Dave Wittenberg.
- X-275/Tickle-Tummy – A round, pink experiment with rabbit-like ears, no legs, and a patterned torso, which she uses to jump high. Her primary function is to tickle people. She was voiced in The Series by Tress MacNeille and in the anime by Stephanie Sheh.
- X-276/Remmy – A blue experiment with a huge head who resembles a ghost. He is designed to enter a sleeping person's head and turn dreams into nightmares. His "one true place" is making virtual reality games. His name is in reference to rapid eye movement sleep (REM sleep), in which dreams occur. He was voiced in The Series by Jeff Bennett and the anime by Travis Willingham.
- X-277/Snooty – A purple bat-like experiment who is designed to find and enrich "Snootonium," a rare element that becomes extremely dangerous once enriched and has a similar chemical makeup to mucus. His "one true place" is as Victoria's pet to help clear her sinuses.
- X-285/Lax – A purple parrot-like experiment who is designed to fire a green ray from his antenna that will cause anything it hits to stop working. A person hit by his ray will relax, and a machine hit with the ray will shut down, although the ray's effect wears off in time. His one true place is at the airport, making grouchy passengers enjoy their vacation. He was voiced by Rob Paulsen.
- X-297/Shortstuff – A red-orange crab-like experiment who is able to swivel at the waist more than 360°. He is designed to destroy machinery by entering the mechanism and cutting the internal electrical wiring with his claws. His size was greatly increased by accident when he was zapped by Jumba's growth ray. As a compromise given to maintain his increased size, his "one true place" is serving as a carnival ride. He was voiced by Nancy Cartwright.
- X-300/Spooky – A ghostly green blob-like experiment who is designed to scare people by transforming into their fears. His "one true place" is as a greeter for trick-or-treaters during Halloween, and at an old house believed to be haunted during the rest of the year. He was voiced in The Series by Frank Welker.
- X-303/Amnesio – A blue, beetle-like experiment who is designed to erase people's memory by zapping a red laser beam into their eyes. He was voiced in The Series by Tress MacNeille and in the anime by Travis Willingham.
- X-316/Morpholomew – A red blob-like experiment who is designed to transform others. His "one true place" is at a costume store, temporarily transforming people into the person or character of their choice. In the anime, Hämsterviel modifies him to morph his own body instead of others. He was voiced in The Series by Dee Bradley Baker and the anime by Dave Wittenberg.
- X-319/Spike – A large dark blue porcupine-like experiment whose spikes make people 99% silly (i.e. unintelligent) for 48 hours. Despite his initially grouchy demeanor, Spike is actually very affectionate, and his "one true place" is hugging—and thus taming—truant experiments after he is given armor to cover his spines. He was voiced in The Series by Frank Welker and in the anime by Keith Silverstein.
- X-322/Heckler – An orange experiment with short pointed ears, large fangs, and a shirt and bowtie imprint on his body. He is designed to verbally insult people. His insults can be defused by accepting that they are true. His one true place is sitting over a dunk tank where he provokes people to try and dunk him. He was voiced by Will Sasso.
- X-323/Hunkahunka – A small pink/purple hummingbird-like experiment who is designed to peck people, making them brainwashed into loving with the first person they see. The effect is reversed by being sprayed with water. He was voiced in The Series by Dee Bradley Baker and in the anime by Mary Elizabeth McGlynn.
- X-344/Dupe – A yellow monkey/lemur-like experiment with a brown-striped prehensile appendage protruding from his head that allows him to clone any object. The traits and abilities of the cloned object are divided between the original and the clones, making each duplicate less powerful than the original. His "one true place" is copying ice cones, making them low-calorie. In the anime, he was modified by Hämsterviel so that every duplicate he makes is stronger than the original. He was voiced in The Series by Tara Strong and in the anime by Troy Baker.
- X-345/Elastico – A green, monkey-like experiment who is designed to distract enemies by performing tricks with his elastic body. He was found already activated and in his "one true place": a circus. In the anime, he was modified by Hämsterviel to gain the ability to transform people and objects into circus-themed animals or objects. He was voiced in The Series by Jeff Bennett and in the anime by Wally Wingert.
- X-355/Swapper – A two-headed, lizard-like experiment who is designed to switch people's minds. Lilo and Stitch tame Swapper, but his "one true place" is not revealed. He was voiced in The Series by Frank Welker and in the anime by Ted Biaselli. In the anime, he can speak English, with both heads speaking simultaneously.
- X-360/Drowsy – A gray sheep-like experiment who is designed to put people to sleep by bleating, although the effect is near-permanent. His "one true place" is putting insomniacs to sleep.
- X-375/Phantasmo – A green phantom-like experiment who can become intangible and possess inanimate objects. His "one true place" is at the Macky Macaw's restaurant, possessing a previously non-functional Macky Macaw animatronic. He is voiced by Nancy Cartwright.
- X-383/Swirly – A turquoise koala-like experiment with a large head and an expressionless face with big black eyes. He is able to hypnotize anyone into obeying the next command they hear. His "one true place" is hypnotizing people at parties to provide harmless entertainment.
- X-397/Spats – A yellow squirrel/cat-like experiment who is designed to make individuals fight with each other by zapping them with a beam fired from his tail. His "one true place" is in Wizard Kelly's professional wrestling show, where he makes wrestlers fight more convincingly.
- X-501/Yin and X-502/Yang – Two experiments of opposite elements named after the concept of yin and yang in Taoism. Yin is a female, teal, octopus/squid-like experiment who sprays water at high pressures. Yang is a male, orange-red, weasel/lizard-like experiment who shoots lava. Their "one true place" is using their abilities to create islands. Both experiments were voiced by Frank Welker.
- X-505/Ploot – A blue-green, gastropod-like experiment who is designed to flood entire cities with sludge made from trash that he collects. His "one true place" is cleaning Lahui Beach. He was voiced in The Series by Frank Welker. In the anime, he was voiced by Steve Blum in his enlarged form and by Kari Wahlgren in his small form.
- X-509/Sprout – A plant-like experiment with a purple head who is designed to grow into an uncontrollable forest of destruction. Sprout appears in the anime under Hämsterviel's control, where he was modified with 627's DNA. He was voiced in The Series by Frank Welker. In the anime, he was voiced by Steve Blum in the second season episode "Son of Sprout" in both large and small sizes and the third season episode "Sprout 2.0" in large size only, while Mary Elizabeth McGlynn voiced him in small size in the latter episode.
- X-513/Richter – A purple Ankylosaurus-like experiment designed to cause earthquakes by slapping his tail on the ground. His "one true place" is making milkshakes at Lahui Beach's rental hut. He was voiced by Tress MacNeille.
- X-515/Deforestator – A purple wombat-like experiment with long blade-like claws who is designed to cut down entire forests. He was voiced by Frank Welker.
- X-520/Cannonball – A large pink experiment with a large posterior who is designed to jump into large bodies of water, generating massive tidal waves that can wash away entire planets. His "one true place" is at Lahui Beach where he can generate large waves for surfing. He was voiced by Tress MacNeille.
- X-521/Wrapper – A yellow experiment who is designed to wrap individuals with the roll on tape on his tail. He was initially adopted as one of Mrs. Hasagawa's "cats" in The Series, and later appeared in the anime transmutated by Hämsterviel to wrap people in nearly-indestructible boxes.
- X-523/Slushy – A blue, koala-like experiment who can generate ice. His "one true place" is making shaved ice, which Dupe later joins him in. He was voiced in The Series by Frank Welker and in the anime episode "Stitch Ahoy!" by Steve Blum.
- X-529/Digger – A tan meerkat-like experiment with a drill-like tail who is designed to drill through planets. He was activated at the end of Stitch! The Movie and appears sporadically in Lilo & Stitch: The Series.
- X-540/Phoon – A red elephant-like experiment who can create strong typhoon-like winds. Her "one true place" is creating winds for windsurfers on Lahui Beach. She was voiced by Grey DeLisle.
- X-544/Thresher – A small, rough, purple gastropod-like experiment with spiky mace-like tentacles. He is designed to thrash crops with his tentacles. He was voiced in the anime by Patrick Seitz.
- X-586/Tank – A round orange armadillo/bulldog-like experiment who is designed to eat metal; the more metal he consumes, the larger he grows. He was voiced by Frank Welker.
- X-600/Woops – A purple, Stitch-like experiment with a green-tipped tail. He has all of Stitch's powers, but is clumsy and tends to accidentally bumps into, accidentally knocks over and/or breaks anything he touches and only says, "Woops!" after doing so. His "one true place" is as a valued member of Pleakley's bowling team, since the one thing he can actually do well is knock things over, including bowling pins. He was voiced by Rob Paulsen.
- X-601/Kixx – A purple, four-armed Tasmanian Devil-like experiment who is designed to beat up other people. His "one true place" is teaching people how to kickbox. He was voiced in The Series by Frank Welker and in the anime by Steve Blum.
- X-602/Sinker – A purple shark-like experiment who is designed to destroy ships with his dorsal fin. His "one true place" is at a restaurant where he uses his fin to cut food. He was voiced in the anime by Ben Diskin.
- X-604/Houdini – A whitish-tan rabbit-like experiment with large round black eyes. He is designed to turn himself and others invisible by blinking. His "one true place" is as a Hollywood magician. Houdini was voiced in The Series by Rob Paulsen and Keith Silverstein in the anime.
- X-606/Holio – A small, red chipmunk-like experiment with a wide, large mouth who is designed to create a matter-sucking black hole when he opens his mouth. His "one true place" is working in construction sites, clearing up waste by sucking in unneeded matter.
- X-608/Slugger – A yellow Pterosaur-like experiment who is designed to deflect projectiles with his bat-like tail. His "one true place" is as a baseball coaching assistant.
- X-609/Heat – A small, red-orange vaguely dog-like experiment with a large black oval embedded in his forehead that can generate fire. He was voiced by Travis Willingham in the anime, in which he was mistaken for Splodyhead in the English dub.
- X-610/Witch – A purple bat-like experiment who is designed to have many supernatural abilities. These include the abilities of a ghost and being able to possess others to turn them into evil witches. She was introduced in the Stitch! anime, in which she was voiced by Mary Elizabeth McGlynn.
- X-613/Yaarp – A cyan lemur-like experiment with four arms, a spring-like tail, and megaphone-like antennae that can emit sonic blasts. His "one true place" is serving as an alien invasion alarm and a buzzer for the hula school.
- X-617/Plasmoid – A green scorpion-like experiment with a pincer-less tail. He is designed to shoot explosive balls of plasma from his tail.
- X-619/Splodyhead – Also known as "Splody" for short, he is a small, red-furred, dragon-like experiment with six legs who fires hot plasma blasts from his lone nostril. His "one true place" is lighting tiki torches at the local luau. He was voiced by Frank Welker. Splodyhead also makes a cameo appearance in Big Hero 6 as a pillow on Fred's bed.
- X-621/Chopsuey – A green, Stitch-like experiment who only appears in the PlayStation 2 video game Disney's Stitch: Experiment 626.
- X-624/Angel – A pink koala-like experiment who bears a great feminine resemblance to Stitch and is his love interest. She is designed to convert reformed beings, primarily experiments made before her, by singing a song. She is a highly-successful pop singer in the Stitch! anime.
- X-625/Reuben – A yellow koala/marmot-like experiment who has all of Stitch's abilities (plus greater English fluency), but is a lazy coward who prefers to make and eat sandwiches.
- X-626/Stitch – A blue koala-like experiment who was designed to cause chaos and destruction, but defied his destructive programming after being adopted by Lilo. Being the titular lead of the franchise, he is the only experiment to appear in all the franchise's films, television series, video games, and theme park attractions, among other works.
- Experiment 627 – A red koala-like experiment who is Jumba's first experiment made using the limited technology he has on Earth. He is more powerful than Stitch, with higher strength, greater durability, and more abilities without any of the same weaknesses as his predecessor.
- X-629/Leroy – A red koala-like experiment who looks like a rougher version of Stitch and was forcibly created by Jumba under the orders of Hämsterviel. He was made using Stitch's template and has all of his abilities, plus the ability to instantly regrow his fur and partially shapeshift to resemble Stitch. He is the titular antagonist of Leroy & Stitch.
- Skunkuna – A skunk-like experiment from the Stitch! anime who is able to shoot explosive pellets that release an unbearable stench upon impact. He was created by Hämsterviel and lacks a numerical designation. He was voiced by Dave Wittenberg.

== Characters introduced in Lilo & Stitch: The Series ==
=== Angel (X-624) ===
Angel
- First appearance: "Angel"; Lilo & Stitch: The Series; 2004
- Designed by: Jose Zelaya
- Voiced by: Tara Strong; Kate Higgins (Stitch! anime); Lo Lauren ("Glitter Glide")
- Alias: Experiment 624
- Nickname: Boojiboo (by Stitch)
- Species: Extraterrestrial genetic experiment
- Gender: Female
- Occupation: Singer (Stitch! anime)
- Abilities: Hypnotism through a siren song that affects the morality of listeners (primarily experiments made before her); Superhuman strength, durability, and agility; Tendril-like antennae; Adept at martial arts

Angel (Experiment 624) is a pink female experiment who is Stitch's love interest with a great feminine resemblance to him. Stitch is madly in love with her and she shares the same feeling; they call each other their "boojiboo", a word of endearment in their native Tantalog language that is analogous to "mate". Angel can hypnotize others (mainly experiments made before her) by singing a siren song that converts them from good to evil, or vice versa when she sings her song backward. However, she can not hypnotize experiments created after her, including Reuben (625) and Stitch. In the anime series Stitch!, she is a famous singer who triumphs worldwide. She is voiced by Tara Strong in Western-produced media, and by Kate Higgins in the anime's English dub. She was designed by Jose Zelaya, an El Salvador-born character designer working at Disney Television Animation.

In her eponymous debut episode, "Angel", she was introduced as a saboteur working for Gantu and Hämsterviel, having been found by the former prior to the episode's events. She causes Stitch to fall in love with her at first sight in order to trick him into bringing her into the Pelekais' home and using Jumba's computer to find rehabilitated experiments. However, she develops feelings for Stitch due to his kindness towards her and betrays Gantu to prevent him from bringing experiments to Hämsterviel, although he responds by capturing her and taking her away from Stitch. In her only other episode in The Series, "Snafu", which first aired just before finale film Leroy & Stitch premiered, Lilo and Stitch rescue Angel along with several other captured experiments in Gantu's spaceship, and she and Stitch begin dating as a couple.

Angel becomes a much more recurring character in the Stitch! anime series, having become a successful intergalactic pop singer since the events of Leroy & Stitch. She maintains a long-distance relationship with Stitch in the anime, visiting him during breaks in her extensive touring.

She also previously made an extremely brief, non-speaking cameo appearance in Stitch's Great Escape!.

Despite her limited appearances in Lilo & Stitch: The Series, Angel became one of the franchise's most popular characters. As a result of her popularity, she began making costumed character appearances in the Disney Parks in 2006, mostly at Tokyo Disney Resort and Disneyland Paris, usually appearing with Stitch. On February 14 (Valentine's Day), 2021, she began appearing at Disney's Aulani resort in Hawaii. Various merchandise featuring her likeness have been sold globally, including in the United States where the anime that she appears more frequently in aired only briefly on Disney XD; this has included merchandise with Walt Disney World and Disneyland branding, and a dedicated character page on the Disney Store website. She has also appeared in various video and mobile games, including Disney Tsum Tsum, Disney Tsum Tsum Festival, Disney Magic Kingdoms, Disney Getaway Blast, Disney Speedstorm, and Disney Heroes: Battle Mode, while a plush toy of the character appears in the third episode of Monsters at Work. Angel also makes a cameo appearance in the climax of the 2025 live-action film as a holographic image on a monitor in Jumba's ship. On February 6, 2026, Disney Music Group released a song inspired by Angel, "Glitter Glide", performed by Dara Reneé. This was accompanied by an animated music video featuring Angel and Stitch released to the Disney Music Vevo YouTube channel. Later that year, she made her debut in the touring ice show Disney on Ice. On June 24, 2026, also known as "624 Day" or "Angel Day" in reference to the character's numerical designation, Disney released a two-minute animated short to Disney+ and the Disney Kids YouTube channel called Stitch & Angel's Perfect Summer Day. Two days later, on "626 Day" or "Stitch Day" in reference to Stitch's codename, Disney released an episode of the short-form series How Not to Draw focusing on Angel. On August 14, 2026, during the biennial D23 Expo, it was revealed that Angel would be appearing in the sequel to the live-action film, Lilo & Stitch 2 (2028).

=== Experiment 627 ===
Experiment 627
- First appearance: "627"; Lilo & Stitch: The Series; 2003
- Last appearance: Lilo & Stitch; 2025 (cameo appearance)
- Voiced by: Chris Sanders (Lilo & Stitch: The Series); Ben Diskin (Stitch! anime)

In-universe information
- Species: Extraterrestrial (though made on Earth) genetic experiment
- Gender: Male
- Affiliation: Himself
- Abilities: Enhanced versions of all of Stitch's powers, including increased superhuman strength, speed, agility, and durability; Retractable claws, antennae, spines, two lower pairs of arms, and second head; Able to generate and fire hot plasma from his hands, mouth, or eyes; Ice breath; Telekinesis; Electrokinesis; Fire breath (in Stitch!); Generate and shoot sharp spikes from his body (in Stitch!); Rapidly rotate sharp claws like a sawblade (in Stitch!); Generate diamond-like crystals by biting (in Stitch!); Generate plasma-energized spider webs (in Stitch!); Generate illusions (in Stitch!)

After growing fed up with Stitch's constant bragging, Jumba decides to create Experiment 627, a red, koala-like, cone-headed experiment that possesses not only all of Stitch's abilities but also those of at least 20 other experiments and none of their weaknesses. Unlike the other experiments in the franchise (with the possible exception of Leroy), 627 was designed to be irredeemably evil with no possible way of turning good. Because of this, he was never given a name or a place where he belonged. He was voiced by Stitch's voice actors, Chris Sanders (in Lilo & Stitch: The Series) and Ben Diskin (in Stitch!).

After being activated, 627 immediately breaks out of Jumba's ship and flees into the surrounding jungles, eventually stumbling across Reuben and attacking him before stealing and eating his sandwich. Eventually coming into contact with Gantu, 627 became his second-in-command and quickly got to work on capturing the experiments whilst also repeatedly humiliating Stitch with his superior abilities. However, he is ultimately defeated as Stitch exploits a flaw in his programming; he has an "extra" sense of humor and will collapse if he laughs too much. He is then dehydrated into his pod form.

In 627's only anime episode, Hämsterviel acquires and reactivates 627, who is also reprogrammed to speak a wider vocabulary (he only said "Evil!" in his original Western appearance). He disguises him himself as a human duke to lure Angel to a fake castle and use her to lead Stitch into a trap. He nearly succeeds until Jumba recalls his original flaw, and Stitch and his friends exploit it again. He then saves Stitch and his friends from Hämsterviel's castle (which was also a rocket) and then Stitch and Angel from being crushed by Hämsterviel's spaceship, though only because, as 627 self-declares, that only he gets to destroy Stitch. He then leaves Earth by taking a space scooter meant for Gantu.

627 has also appeared as a costumed character in Disney Parks, usually with other experiments.

627 makes a cameo appearance in the climax of the 2025 live-action film as a holographic image on a monitor in Jumba's ship. The image shows him with more vicious fangs not seen in his original animated counterpart and with horns instead of antennae. Jumba also states to Stitch in said climax that he intends to upgrade the latter into an Experiment 627 by removing his capacity for love and empathy, though this fails when Lilo and Stitch defeat Jumba.

=== Victoria ===
Victoria
- First appearance: "Swapper"; Lilo & Stitch: The Series; 2004
- Last appearance: Leroy & Stitch; 2006
- Created by: Jess Winfield
- Voiced by: Alyson Stoner
- Occupation: Hula student

Victoria is a friend that Lilo meets in the second season of Lilo & Stitch: The Series. In her first episode, "Swapper", she had just moved into Kokaua Town, also joining Lilo's hula class. When she and Lilo were becoming friends, Mertle tried to befriend her so that she would not be Lilo's friend, claiming that she was weird. However, despite Mertle's best efforts, Victoria reveals that she also liked weird things and decided to become Lilo's best (human) friend, to which Mertle angrily responds by saying, "We would never tolerate with anyone who actually has fun with Lilo." Following the agreement from the other girls, Mertle then ditches Victoria who happily remains with Lilo.

Victoria's appearance in the series is very short. She then appears briefly in the episode "Slick" where she, Lilo, and the other girls compete against each other to sell the most candy bars for their hālau hula.

Then in "Snooty" (the only episode where she and Lilo are actually seen hanging out together), she becomes frightened of Experiment 277 (Snooty), a bat-like experiment who she mistakes for a vampire. After Lilo discovers it's an experiment she tries to convince Victoria not to slay it, but to catch it and try to make friends with it, pointing out that the experiments can be turned from bad to good. But after it puts Stitch out of commission, she refuses to believe Lilo and decides to team up with Gantu to slay the experiment. Later, however, after Lilo shows up and saves her from Gantu she realizes her mistake and saves Snooty from Gantu. Furthermore, when Snooty shows a notable ability to clear out Victoria's often-clogged sinuses, she decides to keep him as a pet.

In "Remmy", she appears with Mertle and the other hula girls in Lilo's dream where they all treat her nicely at first, but then she begins to treat her as badly as the other girls when the dream turns into a nightmare.

In "Wishy-Washy", she appears briefly at the end when she graduates to intermediate hula.

She then makes two cameo appearances in Leroy & Stitch, first when she gets a new haircut from Clip, and later when she is taking Snooty for a walk, prior to his capture by Leroy.

=== Other recurring characters ===
- Mr. Wong (voiced by Clyde Kusatsu): The owner of the rental hut on Lahui Beach and Nani's employer in early season one. He is quite demanding of her working at his hut when and how he wants her to, such as having her work on her day off when an earthquake messed up the hut, but he is otherwise understanding and forgiving when she has to deal with her personal troubles. Nani leaves his employ for unknown reasons and gets hired by Mr. Jameson to work at the Birds of Paradise Hotel partway through the season, causing Mr. Wong to be removed from the show except for the intro, although he briefly returns in "Woops" as part of Pleakley's domino toppling team, speaking only one line when Pleakley begins to monologue.
- Mrs. Edmonds (voiced by April Winchell): Mertle's mother. Unlike her daughter, she is kind to Lilo. However, she also spoils her daughter heavily, to the point where Mertle even gets to celebrate "half-birthday" parties. She makes a cameo appearance in the live-action film (credited as "Mertle's Mom"), in which she is portrayed by Isabelle Du. Unlike in the animated franchise, in which she is a single mother (possibly divorced from her unseen husband Karl), she is seen with and remains married to her husband (credited as "Mertle's Dad"), who is portrayed by Justin Martin. Both of Mertle's parents get Lilo expelled from her hālau hula at the beginning of the 2025 film after Lilo pushes Mertle off the stage during a recital, with their dialogue implying that Lilo had caused several past incidents there prior to the recital.
- Keoni Jameson (voiced by Shaun Fleming): A young, laid-back boy who enjoys skateboarding and on whom Lilo has a crush. Lilo constantly tries to vie for his affections. He had a crush on Pleakley, whom he knows as Lilo's "aunt", in the episode "Hunkahunka", but in "Nosy" he stated that he only had the crush for that one week.
- Mr. Jameson (voiced by Bryan Cranston): The father of Keoni and Nani's employer from midway through season one onward. He owns several businesses around Kauai, including the Birds of Paradise Hotel.
- Officer Kahiko (voiced by Kevin Michael Richardson): A police officer who knows Lilo well and occasionally tries to keep her out of trouble when she isn't accompanied by Nani.
- Aunt Stacy (voiced by April Winchell): Mertle's aunt. She's a Hollywood producer and she strangely cannot remember Mertle's name. She only appears in "Houdini" and "Spike".
- Charles and Mary: A vacationing couple who usually get messed with by the experiments in most of their appearances. Their appearances are based on executive producer Bobs Gannaway and his wife. Neither of them have a consistent voice actor, as they've had different voices in each of their speaking appearances.

== Characters introduced in Leroy & Stitch ==
=== Leroy (X-629) ===
Leroy
- First appearance: Leroy & Stitch; 2006
- Last appearance: Stitch & the Samurai; 2020
- Created by: Jess Winfield
- Voiced by: Chris Sanders
- Alias: Experiment 629
- Species: Extraterrestrial genetic experiment
- Gender: Male
- Abilities: Identical abilities to Stitch (see that character's infobox on his article for more information); Limited shapeshifting to resemble Stitch; Instant fur regrowth

Leroy (Experiment 629) is Stitch's evil twin brother who is created in Leroy & Stitch. He has red fur, frilly ears, yellow teeth, bent antennae, three bent spines on his back, a fluffy tail, and a slightly deeper voice as well as two extra, retractable arms and retractable claws on his front paws. Jumba started creating him from a template similar to Stitch until Dr. Hämsterviel captured him and forced him to make a "new version" of 626 (Stitch). He is designed to have all of Stitch's powers, but he also has the ability to disguise himself as Stitch by changing his fur from red to blue. He is voiced by Chris Sanders.

As of June 2020, Leroy's only other appearance in the Lilo & Stitch franchise proper has been in the second chapter of a two-chapter Disney Tsum Tsum-themed side story of the manga Stitch & the Samurai that was released via the Japanese version of the Disney Tsum Tsum mobile game for a limited time throughout that month. Notably, the manga was the first Disney media to number Leroy as Experiment 629, although the second chapter of the side story was not published in English; the number would be proclaimed for English-speaking audiences the following year through a Disney-licensed sticker book revolving around the franchise.

== Characters introduced in Stitch! ==
=== Yuna Kamihara ===
Yuna Kamihara
- First appearance: "Ichariba Chodei"; Stitch!; 2008
- Last appearance: Stitch! Perfect Memory; 2015
- Created by: Masami Hata
- Voiced by: Eden Riegel (English); Motoko Kumai (Japanese)
- Occupation: Student; Karate instructor (Madhouse seasons)

Yuna Kamihara (上原ユウナ, Kamihara Yūna) is a tomboyish 4th-grade (later 5th grade in the third season) student who lives on a fictional island off the shore of Okinawa in the Ryukyus called Izayoi Island. Living on Izayoi Island, she practices and teaches karate, having learned it from her grandfather. Her grandpa also did the honor of giving her a special type of moonsand as a good luck charm in her study of karate before he left.

During the Madhouse-produced first two seasons, she lives a rather normal cherished life with her grandmother. Her parents are absent in her life; her father is out at work a lot as a marine biologist around Okinawa, and her mother died when she was an infant. Her life remained normal yet happy until one day, after a varied coincidence, she meets Stitch, who crash-landed on her island after he got caught in a wormhole that sent him to Earth. From then and there when they met, the two became best friends and the duo went on various adventures on Stitch's quest in order to be "good". Yuna though, throughout the majority of the anime, finds friends like Taro, Sasha, JJ, Tombo, yōkai like Kijimunaa, and even in experiments like Angel. Her strong sense of justice is what makes her a tomboy, which shows against evildoers like Dr. Hämsterviel and against rivals like Penny and her gang of bullies.

In the Shin-Ei Animation-produced third season, she and Stitch move off Izayoi and onto the fictional Okinawan city of New Town to live with her cousin Tigerlily there, at the behest of Yuna's grandmother. (A flashback scene in the Japanese original version of the season's first episode states that it is mainly because Izayoi Elementary School is about to close down after one last school year.) She becomes a student at New Town Elementary School and continues to go on adventures with Stitch in the city.

The creators of the anime got Yuna's name from "yūna" (右納) one of the alternate Japanese names of sea hibiscus commonly used in Okinawa and Amami. Yuna's birthday is on February 25. Yuna's surname Kamihara wasn't unveiled until much later, although previous guesses were Chitama, after the dojo and the forest on Izayoi and Hanako, which was Yuna's previous name and design during the development of the anime.

=== Gramma ===
Gramma
- First appearance: "Ichariba Chodei"; Stitch!; 2008
- Last appearance: "A Very Stinky Christmas"; Stitch! ~Best Friends Forever~; 2010
- Created by: Masami Hata
- Voiced by: Gwendoline Yeo (English); Hisako Kyōda (Japanese)

Gramma (おばあ, Obaa) is Yuna's grandmother who raises her on Izayoi Island during the show's first two seasons. She is a kind, patient, elderly woman who is very knowledgeable about yōkai and the spiritual side of the island.

=== Kijimunaa ===
Kijimunaa
- First appearance: "Kijimunaa"; Stitch!; 2008
- Last appearance: Stitch! ~The Mischievous Alien's Great Adventure~ (2009)
- Created by: Masami Hata
- Voiced by: Colleen O'Shaughnessey (English); Kappei Yamaguchi (Japanese)
- Species: Yōkai (kijimuna)

Kijimunaa (キジムナー, Kijimunā) is a little yōkai, who is Yuna and Stitch's friend. He has long, bushy red hair that covers his eyes and large, round nostrils which can be mistaken for his eyes. He has a powerful sneeze that can knock others off their feet. He is kind of a coward, but with the help of his friends, he can find the courage to best whatever he can.

=== BooGoo ===
BooGoo
- First appearance: "BooGoo"; Stitch! ~The Mischievous Alien's Great Adventure~; 2009
- Last appearance: Stitch! Perfect Memory; 2015
- Voiced by: Steven Jay Blum (English); Hitomi Hase (Japanese)
- Species: Alien shapeshifting insect
- Gender: Female

BooGoo (ブーグー, Būgū) is a mysterious purple alien insect with some shapeshifting abilities who is introduced in the debut episode of the second season, becoming a pet to the alien side of Yuna and Stitch's family. She is considered cute and is beloved by everyone except for Stitch, who finds her to be a nuisance, especially since she tends to eat food off of him, often by tricking him into looking away while he's eating or about to eat.

In her debut, she was found by Dr. Hämsterviel, who sends her to Izayoi Island to mess with Stitch's good deed counter, causing it to count good deeds as "bad" (and thus removing "good deed" points) and bad deeds as "good" (and thus adding points). She was found by Pleakley, who mistakes her to be a kind of fruit fly, and was discovered by Jumba to have been enslaved by Hämsterviel using a controlling device, which Jumba then removes, freeing her. Afterward, Jumba repairs Stitch's good deed counter, and BooGoo joins Yuna and Stitch's family.

=== Tigerlily Sakai ===
Tigerlily Sakai
- First appearance: "Tigerlily"; Stitch! ~The Mischievous Alien's Great Adventure~; 2010
- Last appearance: Stitch and the Planet of Sand; 2012
- Voiced by: Laura Bailey (English); Rica Matsumoto (Japanese)
- Full name: Zuruko Sasuga (Japanese original)
- Occupation: Teacher

Tigerlily Sakai, named Zuruko Sasuga (さすがつるこ, Sasuga Zuruko) in the Japanese original, is Yuna's beautiful but mean and bullying cousin who appears midway through season 2. While she seems to be kind-hearted to others, she is harsh and cruel to Yuna for unknown reasons and constantly blackmails her into doing all the chores around the house (although she later claims that she's only trying to be a role model for Yuna). However, when Yuna and Stitch move off to live with her in season 3, she becomes more friendly with Yuna and treats her nicer, although she still forces her to do most of the house chores.

=== Delia ===
Delia
- First appearance: "New Town"; Stitch! ~Best Friends Forever~; 2010
- Last appearance: "Dark-End"; Stitch! ~Best Friends Forever~; 2011
- Created by: Tetsuya Endo
- Voiced by: Mary Elizabeth McGlynn (English); Romi Park (Japanese)
- Species: Alien
- Gender: Female

Delia (デリア, Deria) is an evil alien woman who appears in season 3. She is a tall, white-skinned, big-eared, humanoid alien woman with bright red hair and heterochromatic eyes, a red left eye and a green right eye, with blue sclerae. She has a previous history with both Jumba and Hämsterviel, and is in a partnership with the latter to get the Neo-PowerChip that is inside Stitch. Delia alters a majority of experiments, which causes them to become physically stronger and evil. Delia usually calls Dr. Hämsterviel by false names or pronunciations. When Dr. Hämsterviel's plans go wrong, she usually punishes him with various unusual forms of punishment.

In the final two episodes of the season, she eventually creates her own genetic experiment, Dark End, by stealing a prototype power cell from Jumba, and uses the experiment to begin an invasion of Earth. Although Dark End proves to be powerful, they are eventually defeated by Stitch, and Delia gets arrested by the Grand Councilwoman shortly thereafter along with Gantu, Hämsterviel, and Reuben and is imprisoned with them. She is not seen again afterwards, as she does not appear in either of the post-series specials Stitch and the Planet of Sand and Stitch! Perfect Memory despite the other three aliens appearing.

=== Dark End ===
Dark End
- First appearance: "Boss"; Stitch! ~Best Friends Forever~; 2011
- Last appearance: "Dark-End"; Stitch! ~Best Friends Forever~; 2011
- Voiced by: Roger Craig Smith (English)
- Species: Extraterrestrial genetic experiment
- Gender: Female (Japanese version); Male (English dub)

Dark End is an experiment made by Delia who is designed to be much stronger than Stitch. This experiment is female in the original Japanese version and male in the English dub. They are not among Stitch's cousins, as neither Jumba nor Hämsterviel made them.

=== Other characters ===
==== Seasons one and two (Madhouse) ====
- Yuna's father (ユウナの父): A marine biologist who is very dedicated to his work, he is mostly absent from his daughter Yuna's life. Despite his dedication to his job, he loves being with his daughter. He makes sporadic appearances in photographs during the first season but finally makes his first physical appearance in the second season. He is voiced by Kōichi Yamadera, Stitch's regular Japanese dub voice, in the Japanese original, and Keith Silverstein in the English dub.
- Taro (タロウ, Tarō): Yuna's karate student and classmate. He is voiced by Stephanie Sheh in the dubbed version.
- Suzuki (鈴木さん): A police officer and one of Yuna's karate students. He is voiced by Kirk Thornton in the dubbed version.
- Mr. Honda (本田さん, Honda-san): A mailman who is always exhausted from work. He is voiced by Dave Wittenberg in the dubbed version.
- Ms. Kawasaki (川崎先生, Kawasaki-sensei): The schoolteacher of Yuna, Penny, and Taro at Izayoi Elementary School during the first two seasons, until Tigerlily takes over their class. She is voiced by Kari Wahlgren in the dubbed version.
- J.J. / Jun (ジュン): A young boy who is one of Yuna's karate students. His parents, who run a dry cleaning business, are Midori (voiced by Kate Higgins in the dub) and Jack (ゲンタ, Genta; voiced by Travis Willingham in the dub), the latter who is strict and hard-working. J.J.'s English name is short for Jack Junior. He is voiced by Laura Bailey in the dubbed version.
- Tombo (トンボ): A young man who is one of Yuna's karate students. He is shown in "Angel's Flight" to be a glassblower, but by "Hull & Husk" he has a part-time job working at Penny's father's pineapple factory as a pineapple processor, saying that his glassblowing studio isn't lucrative enough. He is voiced by Dave Wittenberg in the dubbed version.
- Penny / Piko (ピコ): Penny is Yuna's rival in seasons 1 and 2. She is also a black-team karate leader. She is similar to Mertle Edmonds from the previous films and series. She is voiced by Meghan Strange in the dubbed version.
- Kenny / Kouji (こうじ, Kōji): Kenny is Penny's older brother who is always bossed around by her. He is voiced by Derek Stephen Prince in the dubbed version.
- Marvin / Masa (マサ): Kenny and Penny's friend who has short black hair. He is always bossed around by Penny. He is voiced by Laura Bailey in the dubbed version.
- Ted / Taka (タカ): Kenny and Penny's friend who wears a cap and has orange hair. He is always bossed around by Penny. He is voiced by Kari Wahlgren in the dubbed version.
- Sasha / Sae (さえ): A young girl about Yuna's age, 9-years-old, who is introduced in the second season. In the English dub, her given name is Sandra but she's known as "Sasha" for short. A transfer student from Kobe, she joins Yuna's class during the second season. She believes in good fashion and beauty, and is girly in spirit, often talking about fashion, love, and all. She's also quite ditsy at times. She believes Yuna has a good fashion sense and becomes good friends with her; as her fashion sense reminded her of her mother, a tropical fashion designer. Her father is a doctor. She not only has a rather brave personality, like Yuna; but she has a sweet and gentle personality too. Kenny has a crush on Sasha, unbeknownst to her, and Penny secretly dislikes Sasha but believes that Sasha dresses better than she does. Voiced by Melissa Fahn in the dubbed version.
- Experiment 000 (試作品000号, Shisaku-hin 000-gō; Prototype No. 000), a.k.a. Zero (ナンバーゼロ, Nanbā Zero; Number Zero): An evil experiment who is a cyborg version of Stitch. He only appears in the season two finale "Experiment Zero". He was designed for the same destructive purposes as Stitch after him, but he was too violent and unstable for Jumba to control. Jumba would suspend Zero and leave him on an icy planet. Zero would eventually escape, augment himself with cybernetics, and become a warlord of a cyborg army. He is voiced in the original Japanese version by Masao Komaya and in the English dub by Stitch's dub voice Ben Diskin.

==== Season three and post-series specials (Shin-Ei) ====
- Dolores / Ms. Toyoda (豊(とよ)田(だ)さん, Toyoda-san): An intelligent girl introduced in the third season who is Yuna's classmate in Okinawa New Town. She comes across as aloof towards others. She is voiced by Yumiko Kobayashi in the original Japanese version and Colleen O'Shaughnessey in the English dub, replacing Kijimunaa as the latter's regular voice role for this season.
- Hiroman / Takumi (タクミ): A boy from Okinawa New Town, introduced in the third season. A popular soccer player, and love interest of Jessica, he often acts cool and calm. He bears a secret of acting as a maid to his sisters and even dressing up in bishoujo-styled outfits for his sisters' enjoyment. His name obviously a play on "hero man". It is hinted that he and Yuna have feelings for each other since Yuna often saves him from trouble; in the episode "Dorkifier", it was shown that Yuna blushed at him. He is voiced by Hiroaki Miura in the Japanese original and Sam Riegel in the English dub.
- Mr. Matsuda: Yuna's schoolteacher at New Town Elementary during the third season and Hiroman's soccer coach. He is voiced by Travis Willingham in the dub.
- Ani: Lilo's daughter who looks identically to her mother when she was a child (to the point that Stitch initially mistook Ani for a de-aged Lilo). She is voiced by Sumire Morohoshi in the Japanese original and Melissa Fahn in the English dub; both individuals also voiced the young Lilo in the episode "Lilo".
- Jessica / Reika (レイカ): Jessica is Yuna's rival in season 3. She has a crush on Hiroman and friends who she bosses around. She, like Penny, likes to mock and deride Yuna and Stitch. She also bears a trait of saying rather dull jokes and puns, often met with a silent response until she forces others to laugh hysterically at them. She is voiced by Yoko Hikasa in the original Japanese version and Kate Higgins in the English dub.
- Toriko (トリ子(こ)) and Makiko (マキ子(こ)): Jessica's friends, who are forced to laugh at her bad jokes and puns. Toriko is taller, wears a teal vest, a green shirt, a teal skirt, a purple ribbon, and purple sneakers, and has one pigtail on her right side. Makiko is shorter, has short hair, and wears an orange dress, an orange hairband, blue shorts, orange shoes, and yellow knee-high socks. They are respectively voiced by Mai Katagari and Komatsuna Sakato in the Japanese original, and by Ali Hillis and Laura Bailey in the English dub.
- Mitsuki and Hazuki: The twin older sisters of Hiroman and good friends of Tigerlily. They use their beauty to take advantage of others. At home, they boss around their brother, making him do all the chores while they lazily relax. They are respectively voiced in the dubbed version by Ali Hillis and Michelle Ruff.
- Tila-3000 (ティーラ-3000): An information analyst android from the United Galactic Federation sent to Stitch in Stitch! Perfect Memory. She assigned to assist Stitch in stopping rockets that have been stealing resources from planets, one of which ends up stealing sand from Earth and sucking up Yuna and BooGoo in the process. She is voiced in the original Japanese version by Yū Aoi.

== Characters introduced in Stitch & Ai ==
=== Wang Ai Ling ===
Wang Ai Ling
- First appearance: "Hello - Goodbye"; Stitch & Ai; 2017
- Last appearance: "Monstrosity"; Stitch & Ai; 2017
- Voiced by: Erica Mendez (English); Jiang Sunwei (Mandarin)
- Occupation: Student

Wang Ai Ling (王安玲; Wáng Ānlíng) is a young Chinese girl who lives in the Huangshan mountains. Her aunt Daiyu wants to move her to the city, but she wants to stay in the mountains. In her series, Ai befriends Stitch, taking him in as her "dog", and quickly develops a close emotional attachment to him. She helps him ward off the space criminals that want him. She serves as Stitch & Ai's counterpart to Lilo Pelekai.

=== Wang Jiejie ===
Wang Jiejie
- First appearance: "Hello - Goodbye"; Stitch & Ai; 2017
- Last appearance: "Monstrosity"; Stitch & Ai; 2017
- Voiced by: Laura Post (English); Li Yan (Mandarin)
- Occupation: Tea shop clerk

Wang Jiejie (王婕婕; Wáng Jiéjié) is a young Chinese woman who is Ai's older sister. She tries to take care of her younger sister after their parents' death, but their aunt doesn't believe that Jiejie would be able to raise Ai well. Jiejie works at a tea shop for a man named Mr. Ding. She serves as this series's counterpart to Nani Pelekai.

=== Daiyu ===
Daiyu
- First appearance: "Hello - Goodbye"; Stitch & Ai; 2017
- Last appearance: "Nuo Opera"; Stitch & Ai; 2017
- Voiced by: Laura Post (English); Yan Lixuan (Mandarin)

Daiyu (姨妈) is Ai and Jiejie's aunt. After the deaths of her nieces' parents, Daiyu tries to get Ai to move from the mountains to the city, believing that Ai would be raised better over there. Although her belief that her actions are what's best for Ai are similar to how Cobra Bubbles (who also appears in this series) was considering what's best for Lilo in the original Lilo & Stitch film, Daiyu is otherwise unique to this series, having no counterpart from the original Western continuity.

=== Meiying ===
Meiying
- First appearance: "Hello - Goodbye"; Stitch & Ai; 2017
- Last appearance: "Brothers"; Stitch & Ai; 2017
- Voiced by: Cherami Leigh and Xanthe Huynh (both English)
- Occupation: Student

Meiying (美英; Měiyīng) is Ai's rival. Although she serves as this series's counterpart to Mertle Edmonds, she is considerably friendlier towards Ai than Mertle was towards Lilo.

=== Other characters ===
- Commander Wombat: The leader of the reptilian alien race the Jaboodies who desires to have Stitch in his control so that the Jaboodies could win their space war against the Woolagongs and subsequently take over the galaxy. He is voiced by Richard Epcar.
- Commander Platypus: The leader of the platypus-like alien race the Woolagongs who also wants Stitch so that the Woolagongs could win the space war against the Jaboodies and subsequently take over the galaxy. He is voiced by Lucien Dodge.
- Qian Dahu: (钱大胡; Qián dà hú) Jiejie's boyfriend and Ai's drum instructor. He serves as this series's counterpart to David Kawena, with an element of Moses Puloki with regards to his teachings of a local tradition. He is voiced by Lucien Dodge.
- Mr. Ding: Jiejie's employer who runs a tea shop. He is voiced in English by Richard Epcar.
- Sage: A wise, old, and mysterious sage who observes Stitch and Ai's journey, appearing to them, Jumba, and Pleakley at times. He hands ancient scrolls to them so that Jumba can use them to make ancient Chinese creatures. He is voiced in English by Lucien Dodge.
- Dim Long: An orange dragon-like experiment Jumba makes to beta test for future experiments the ability to fly using qi.
- Bao: A boy who is Ai's cousin, appearing in "The Phoenix" and "Nuo Opera". In the former episode, Daiyu brings him to Ai's home to get him to convince her how great the city is and thus motivate her to move to the city, he instead goes on an adventure with her and Stitch that causes him to love the mountains, much to Daiyu's dismay.
- Noo-Bing and Zi: Two alien bounty hunters who appear in "The Phoenix". Noo-Bing, who is small and has four arms, is the brains of the duo, while Zi is the large, muscular, unintelligible brawn who carries Noo-Bing in a compartment on his chest piece. They appear on Earth searching for and trying to capture the titular phoenix Jumba made in the episode to sell to collectors, but they eventually get stopped by Stitch, Ai, and Bao. In exchange for freeing them and the phoenix, Ai and Bao then convince the hunters to switch to photography to take and sell photos of rare creatures, with Ai giving them her camera.
- Skippity: A clumsy alien spy who appears in "Dream On", working for the Woolagongs. He likes to brag about himself in rhyme. He was sent to Earth by them to use a special raygun he invented called a "Dream Beam", which makes its victims' dreams come to life. He tries to incapacitate Stitch by making Stitch's bad dreams come to life, but he ends up shooting Ai by mistake. Stitch later captures him and he, Jumba, Pleakley, and Jumba's newly made mo have Skippity help them find Ai after she skips school. At the end of the episode, Jumba allows Skippity to live in the parallel dimension where he sends his recreated Chinese mythological creatures to live in.
- "Yong": A Jaboodie agent who disguises himself as a human boy and pretends to be Ai's new "brother" to distract her and prevent her from stopping Stitch's brainwashing and triggering of his metamorphosis program. However, the time he spent with Ai caused him to regret his actions. He is voiced in English by Jacob Craner, who was only credited as an additional voice on the series.
- Scratch: A shapeshifting alien who takes on the appearance of a Stitch-like creature with teal fur and notched ears. He was sent by the Jaboodies to trigger Stitch's destructive programming and metamorphosis program.

== Characters introduced in Lilo & Stitch (2025) ==
=== Tūtū ===
Tūtū
- First appearance: Lilo & Stitch (2025)
- Portrayed by: Amy Hill
- Family: David Kawena (grandson); Lilo Pelekai (foster granddaughter)

Tūtū is the grandmother of David Kawena and next-door neighbor of the Pelekais in the live-action film. She is portrayed by Amy Hill, who was previously the voice of Mrs. Hasagawa in the animated continuity.

=== Mrs. Kekoa ===
Mrs. Kekoa
- First appearance: Lilo & Stitch (2025)
- Portrayed by: Tia Carrere
- Occupation: Social worker

Mrs. Kekoa is the social worker for Lilo and Nani Pelekai in the live-action film, taking over the role from Cobra Bubbles (who later joins her by pretending to be a social director to investigate Stitch). She is portrayed by Tia Carrere, the original voice of Nani.
