= Daveigh Chase =

American actress (1990–2026)

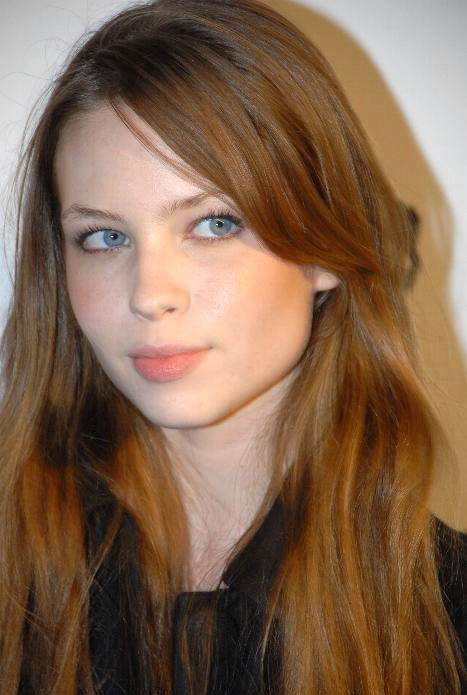
- Chase in 2007
- Born: Daveigh Elizabeth Chase-Schwallier; July 24, 1990; Las Vegas, Nevada, U.S.
- Died: June 16, 2026 (aged 35); Los Angeles, California, U.S.
- Other name: Daveigh Schwallier (Note: Variety mentions that Chase also used the surname "Schwallier", with the Los Angeles Coroner's Office using the name Daveigh Schwallier for her examination case.)
- Occupation: Actress
- Years active: 1998–2016
- Website: Official website (via Wayback Machine)

Daveigh Elizabeth Chase (/dəˈveɪ/ də-VAY; née Chase-Schwallier; July 24, 1990 – June 16, 2026) was an American actress. She began her acting career as a child, portraying Samantha Darko in the psychological thriller film Donnie Darko (2001) and Samara Morgan in the American remake of the horror film The Ring (2002). She also provided the United States American English dub voice of Chihiro Ogino in the Studio Ghibli film Spirited Away (2001), Lilo Pelekai in the Disney animated film Lilo & Stitch (2002) and its related media franchise, and Betsy in Betsy's Kindergarten Adventures (2008). She later took on adult roles, including in the HBO drama series Big Love (2006–2011) and independent films such as Yellow (2012) and Jack Goes Home (2016).

Chase received three awards from six nominations, including an Annie Award for Outstanding Achievement for Voice Acting and an MTV Movie Award for Best Villain.

Chase retired from acting in 2016 and died at the age of 35 from complications associated with AIDS on June 16, 2026.

== Early life ==
Daveigh Elizabeth Chase-Schwallier was born on July 24, 1990, in Las Vegas, Nevada, to Cathy Chase and John David Schwallier. She was young when her parents divorced. Each remarried, and she grew up with several half-siblings, including a younger half-brother named Cade. Chase later used her mother's maiden name professionally.

She subsequently relocated with her mother to Albany, Oregon, where she performed in local talent shows and pageants. Her early vocal performances were centered on country music, for which she won a national vocal competition during her childhood. During a stay in Los Angeles, Chase began attending casting calls and booking minor roles, including national television advertising spots at age seven for the Campbell's Soup Company.

Chase appeared in a regional theatrical production of the musical Utah! at the Tuacahn Amphitheatre in 1998, sharing the role of Norma Sanderson. She credited this stage experience with refining her live singing ability and performance presence.

== Career ==
=== 1998–2001: Early roles and breakthrough ===
Chase made her television debut in 1998, appearing in a minor guest role on Sabrina the Teenage Witch. She appeared in the 1999 television film Michael Landon, the Father I Knew, portraying a young Shawna Landon. Over the next two years, she secured a succession of episodic roles in Charmed, The Practice, ER and Family Law. Chase and her mother subsequently maintained a dual residency arrangement, splitting their time between their family home in Oregon and a temporary apartment in Los Angeles to accommodate her filming schedules.

In 2001, Chase secured her breakout role portraying Samantha Darko, the younger sister of the titular character (played by Jake Gyllenhaal), in the independent psychological thriller Donnie Darko. Although the film underperformed during its initial theatrical release, it quickly garnered a devoted cult following and received widespread critical acclaim.

=== 2002–2005: Lilo & Stitch, The Ring, and television success ===
Chase's international profile expanded significantly in 2002. She was cast as the voice of Lilo Pelekai, a quirky and lonely Hawaiian girl who befriends a destructive alien fugitive, in the Walt Disney Animation Studios feature Lilo & Stitch. The film was a critical and commercial triumph, grossing over $273 million worldwide. Chase's voice performance was highly praised for its emotional authenticity and comedic timing; she was subsequently awarded the Outstanding Voice Acting in an Animated Feature at the 30th Annie Awards in 2003. She reprised the role of Lilo in the direct-to-video film Stitch! The Movie (2003) and the subsequent television series Lilo & Stitch: The Series, which aired on the Disney Channel from 2003 to 2006. Another voice acting role followed that year in Hayao Miyazaki's acclaimed animated fantasy film Spirited Away, that had a Disney-produced English-language dub where Chase provided the voice for protagonist Chihiro Ogino. Spirited Away later won the Academy Award for Best Animated Feature.

Later in 2002, Chase starred as Samara Morgan in the supernatural horror film The Ring, a remake of the 1998 Japanese film Ring. Playing a malevolent, drowned child who curses a videotape, Chase required extensive prosthetic makeup and performed physically demanding stunt work in the role. Her portrayal gained wide notice in early 2000s pop culture, and the character of Samara became an iconic cinematic villain. At the 2003 MTV Movie Awards, Chase won the Best Villain award. For the 2005 sequel The Ring Two, Chase was credited due to the use of archival footage from the first film, although actress Kelly Stables performed all the new on-screen material and motion capture for Samara.

Between 2003 and 2004, Chase held a main cast role as Joyce, the quirky girlfriend of the title character, in the Fox period sitcom Oliver Beene. Her other notable credits during this period included the direct-to-video film Beethoven's 5th (2003) and the romantic comedy Carolina (2003), in which she played the younger version of Julia Stiles' character.

=== 2006–2016: Big Love and final roles ===
In 2006, Chase secured the role of Rhonda Volmer in Big Love, a critically acclaimed drama series on HBO which centered on a polygamist family in Utah led by patriarch Bill Henrickson (Bill Paxton). Chase's character, Rhonda, was introduced as the teenage child bride of the compound's ruthless prophet, Roman Grant (Harry Dean Stanton). Chase remained a recurring and main presence on the series until its conclusion in 2011, earning praise for her chilling depiction of a young woman corrupted by religious extremism. Also in 2006, Chase voiced Lilo for the final time in Leroy & Stitch, the conclusion to the Lilo & Stitch television series. In 2008, she took on the voice role of Betsy in the PBS Kids educational animated series Betsy's Kindergarten Adventures.

In 2009, Chase reprised her Donnie Darko role as Samantha in the sequel S. Darko. Set seven years after the events of the original film, the narrative follows an 18-year-old Samantha on a cross-country road trip to Los Angeles, where she becomes plagued by bizarre visions and time anomalies. Unlike its predecessor, S. Darko received overwhelmingly negative reviews from critics. Having been made without the approval of (nor input from) the original film's creator, Richard Kelly, the sequel shares minimal continuity with its predecessor.

During the 2010s, Chase appeared primarily in independent thriller and horror films. She played a supporting role in the drama Yellow (2012) and starred in the independent thriller Killer Crush (2015). In 2016, she co-starred in the thriller American Romance, and had a supporting role in the psychological horror film Jack Goes Home. Also in 2016, she provided the English voice of Kiwako Seto in the video game Let It Die. American Romance, Jack Goes Home and Let It Die served as her final acting credits.

== Personal life ==
Beginning in 2016, Chase retired from the entertainment industry. According to Chase's former manager John Ryan, Chase had a scheduled meeting with director Rob Reiner for a film project in November 2015, but failed to appear at the venue. Ryan cited this as the start of her "disappearance"; Chase had no contact with any of her family and friends after the failed meeting.

In her final years, Chase was reportedly living on the streets of Skid Row and downtown Los Angeles. According to her mother, Chase had suffered from drug addiction since about 2016, when she was prescribed painkillers after a motorcycle accident severely injured her back. However, her father claimed that Chase had suffered from drug addiction since the age of 13 (around 2003 or 2004).

In November 2017, Chase was arrested in Los Angeles on a felony charge after being found riding as a passenger in a vehicle that had been reported stolen. Eight months earlier in February 2017, Chase was detained by LAPD detectives and questioned after she was seen leaving an unresponsive man at a local hospital, who was subsequently pronounced dead of a suspected drug overdose.

In August 2018, Chase was arrested by the LAPD on a misdemeanor charge of drug possession and spent a short time in a Hollywood jail before being released on a $1,000 bond. By November 2018, she was charged with two misdemeanor counts stemming from these incidents: possession of a controlled substance without a valid prescription and possession of drug paraphernalia. Chase's mother stated that she last saw her daughter when visiting her in jail in October 2019, and that they had lost contact entirely after Chase failed to meet her as planned upon her release.

For a decade Chase was reclusive and her family and friends could not reach her. Her former manager John Ryan began producing a documentary about his search for Chase, to be titled Finding Lilo; it was in progress by the time of Chase's death.

== Illness and death ==
On June 4, 2026, Chase was found in the back seat of a vehicle where she was suffering from a headache, weakness, confusion and right thumb pain with a meth pipe nearby. She was admitted to the Los Angeles General Medical Center for treatment of severe malnutrition following a period of extreme weight loss. During her hospitalization, her condition became increasingly critical after she was diagnosed with bacterial meningitis, several bloodstream infections, and AIDS. Doctors stated that she did not have much time left to live.

To help manage rising medical expenses and support Chase in regaining stability, her alleged boyfriend, Roy Hernandez, created a GoFundMe crowdfunding campaign. In the campaign description, Hernandez said that Chase had faced significant personal difficulties in her post-acting life, including systemic bullying, a painful estrangement from her family, and ongoing housing instability in downtown Los Angeles.

Chase died hours after the fundraising page was launched on June 16, from organ failure caused by her infections, substance abuse and AIDS. She was 35. A secondary cause of death was chronic polysubstance use. Hernandez publicly announced her death through TMZ the following day, June 17, stating that her bloodstream infections had led to septic complications that caused her body to shut down.

Following her death, a dispute emerged regarding her final arrangements and the crowdfunding campaign, which Hernandez claimed was intended to help fund her cremation. Chase's former manager, John Ryan, and her father, John Schwallier, publicly denounced the fundraiser, advising fans not to donate. Ryan stated that Chase's family was independently handling all funeral and cremation arrangements.

Chase left behind $400,000 in personal property.

== Tributes ==
Fans and colleagues in the entertainment industry paid tribute after Chase's death was announced. Co-workers, fans, and publications similarly paid tribute by commemorating her film and television roles. Lilo & Stitch co-directors Chris Sanders and Dean DeBlois paid tribute to Chase with artwork featuring Stitch, Scrump, and Pudge.

The animated Lilo & Stitch short film Lilo & Scratch, which was released in November 2026, was dedicated to Chase.

== Filmography ==
=== Film ===
Year	Title	Role	Notes	Ref.
2001	Donnie Darko	Samantha Darko		
2001	A.I. Artificial Intelligence	Child Singer	Deleted scenes	
2001	Spirited Away	Chihiro Ogino	Voice; English dub	
2002	Lilo & Stitch	Lilo Pelekai	Voice	
2002	The Ring	Samara Morgan		
2003	Haunted Lighthouse	Annabel	Short film	
2003	Carolina	Georgia Mirabeau (young)		
2003	Stitch! The Movie	Lilo Pelekai	Voice; direct-to-video	
2003	Beethoven's 5th	Sara Newton	Direct-to-video	
2005	The Ring Two	Samara Morgan	Archive footage	
2009	S. Darko	Samantha Darko		
2012	Yellow	Mary Holmes (young)		
2012	Little Red Wagon	Kelley Bonner		
2016	Jack Goes Home	Shanda		
2016	American Romance	Krissy Madison	Final film role	

=== Television ===
Year	Title	Role	Notes
1998	Sabrina the Teenage Witch	Little Girl	Episode: "Christmas Amnesia"
1999	Michael Landon, the Father I Knew	Shawna Landon (age 8)	Television film
2000	Charmed	Christina Larson (young)	Episode: "Pardon My Past"
2000	The Practice	Jennifer Wakefield	Episode: "Appeal and Denial"
2000	ER	Taylor Walker	Episode: "The Greatest of Gifts"
2000	From Where I Sit	Anna	Television film
2000	Edgar MaCobb Presents	Sally	Television film
2001	Yes, Dear	Brooke	Episode: "The Big Snip"
2001	The Lot	Peggy Franklin	Episode: "Kids"
2001	That's Life	Mary-Ellen	Episode: "Boo!"
2001	Touched by an Angel	Heather Albright	Episode: "Heaven's Portal"
2001	Inside Schwartz	Randi Johnson	Episode: "Comic Relief Pitcher"
2001	Say Uncle	Lucy Janik	Television film
2002	Family Law	Jamie Garibaldi	Episode: "Blood and Water"
2002	The Rats	Amy Costello	Television film
2003	Fillmore!	Joyce Summitt / Tracy Mabini	Voice; episodes: "Of Slain Kings on Checkered Fields" (Joyce Summitt) & "Links in a Chain of Honor" (Tracy Mabini)
2003	Oliver Beene	Joyce	Main role; 23 episodes
2003–2006	Lilo & Stitch: The Series	Lilo Pelekai	Voice; lead role; 65 episodes
2004	CSI: Crime Scene Investigation	Tessa Press	Episode: "Turn of the Screws"
2004	Cold Case	Ariel Shuman	Episode: "The Sleepover"
2006	Leroy & Stitch	Lilo Pelekai	Voice; television film
2006–2011	Big Love	Rhonda Volmer	Main role; 32 episodes
2008	Betsy's Kindergarten Adventures	Betsy	Voice; lead role; 58 episodes
2008	Without a Trace	Diana Reed	Episode: "A Bend in the Road"
2009	Mercy	Ashley Jeffries	Episode: "I'm Not That Kind of Girl"
2015	Killer Crush	Paige York	Television film

=== Music videos ===
Year	Title	Artist(s)	Role	Note	Ref.
2001	"What About Us?"	Ministry	Child Singer	Cameo	

=== Video games ===
Year	Title	Voice role	Ref.
2002	Disney's Lilo & Stitch	Lilo Pelekai	
2002	Lilo & Stitch: Trouble in Paradise	Lilo Pelekai	
2002	Lilo & Stitch: Hawaiian Adventure	Lilo Pelekai	
2016	Let It Die	Kiwako Seto (English dub)	

== Awards and nominations ==
Year	Nominated work	Award	Category	Result	Ref.
2002	Touched by an Angel	Young Artist Award	Best Performance in a TV Drama Series: Guest Starring Young Actress	Nominated	
2003	The Ring	Phoenix Film Critics Society Awards	Best Performance by a Youth in a Leading or Supporting Role: Female	Nominated	
2003	The Ring	MTV Movie & TV Awards	Best Villain	Won	
2003	Lilo & Stitch	Annie Awards	Outstanding Voice Acting in an Animated Feature Production	Won	
2003	Lilo & Stitch	Phoenix Film Critics Society Awards	Best Performance by a Youth in a Leading or Supporting Role: Female	Nominated	
2003	Lilo & Stitch	Young Artist Award	Best Performance in a Voice-Over Role: Age 10 or Under	Won	
