= Ikigai =

Giving a sense of purpose (Japanese)

Ikigai (生き甲斐, lit. 'a reason for being') is a Japanese concept of an individual's definition of the meaning of their life.

Ikigai can be having a sense of purpose in life, as well as being a source of motivation. According to a study by Michiko Kumano, feeling ikigai as described in Japanese is usually the sense of accomplishment and fulfillment that follows when people pursue their passions. Activities that generate the feeling of ikigai are not imposed on an individual; they are perceived as spontaneous and undertaken willingly, making them personal and dependent on a person's inner self.

According to Japanese psychologist Katsuya Inoue, ikigai is a concept that consists of two aspects: "sources or objects that bring value or meaning to life" and "a feeling that one's life has value or meaning because of the existence of its source or object". Inoue classifies ikigai into three categories – social ikigai, non-social ikigai, and anti-social ikigai – from a social perspective. Social ikigai are forms accepted by society, such as volunteer activities and community activities. A non-social ikigai is not directly related to society, such as faith or self-discipline. Anti-social ikigai is the basic motivation for living through dark emotions, such as the desire to hate someone or something or to continue having a desire for revenge.

== Meaning and etymology ==
The Oxford English Dictionary defines ikigai (/ˈikiˌɡaɪ/) as "a motivating force; something or someone that gives a person a sense of purpose or a reason for living". More generally, it may refer to something that brings pleasure or fulfillment.

The term compounds two Japanese words: iki (生き, meaning 'life; alive') and kai (甲斐, meaning 'effect'), which, when combined and sequentially voiced as gai, result in the meaning 'a reason for living [being alive]; a meaning for [to] life; what [something that] makes life worth living; a 'raison d'être'.

In their book, Ikigai: The Japanese Secret to a Long and Happy Life, Héctor García and Francesc Miralles explain, "This Japanese concept, which translates roughly as 'the happiness of always being busy,' is like logotherapy, but it goes a step beyond." In 2022, the Japanese government posted an article on their official website stating, "A broad concept, it [ikigai] refers to that which brings value and joy to life: from people, such as one's children or friends, to activities including work and hobbies."

== Diagram ==
An example of an Ikigai diagram

In their book, García and Miralles include an Euler diagram created by Marc Winn, which in turn was likely inspired by the "purpose" diagram created in 2011 by Andrés Zuzunaga, replacing "purpose" with "ikigai." This diagram includes four elements: what a person likes, what a person is good at, what the world needs, and what can be rewarded. When these four elements overlap, that person has found their ikigai.

The diagram does not originate in Japan, and has been described as an "unrealistic ideal" that is "catchy but misleading".

== Early popularization ==
Ikigai was first popularized by the Japanese psychiatrist and academic Mieko Kamiya in her 1966 book, On the Meaning of Life (生きがいについて, ikigai ni tsuite). Mieko Kamiya is a Japanese psychiatrist who treated leprosy patients at Nagashima Aiseien Sanatorium. She is known for translating books on philosophy into Japanese.

== Importance ==
In the 1960s, 1970s, and 1980s, ikigai was thought to have two primary forms of manifestation: either in terms of the betterment of society ("subordinating one's own desires to others") or the improvement of oneself ("following one's own path").

According to anthropologist Chikako Ozawa-de Silva, for an older generation in Japan, their ikigai was to "fit this standard mold of company and family", whereas the younger generation reported their ikigai to be about "dreams of what they might become in the future".

== Relation to health ==
Studies have shown no evidence of any correlation with development of malignant tumors and that people who do not experience ikigai are more likely to suffer from cardiovascular diseases.

National Geographic reporter Dan Buettner suggested that ikigai may be one of the reasons for the longevity of the people of Okinawa. According to Buettner, Okinawans have less desire to retire and they continue doing their favorite job as long as they remain healthy. Moai, a close-knit group of friends, is also considered an important factor behind Okinawans' longevity.

An Ikigai scale has been constructed to measure the effects on mental and physical health effects on those people who practice it.

== See also ==
- Eudaimonia – related concept in ancient Greek philosophy
- Joie de vivre
- Logotherapy
- Meaning-making
- Motivation § Types
- Raison d'être
