= Disney's Stitch: Experiment 626 =

2002 prequel video game tie-in to Lilo & Stitch

- NTSC cover art
- Developer: High Voltage Software
- Publisher: Sony Computer Entertainment
- Producer: Jeffrey S. Marks
- Designer: Laralyn McWilliams
- Programmer: Jerome Karaganis
- Artist: Damion J. J. Davis
- Series: Lilo & Stitch
- Platform: PlayStation 2
- Release: NA: June 19, 2002; EU: September 27, 2002
- Genres: Platform, third-person shooter, action-adventure
- Mode: Single-player

Disney's Stitch: Experiment 626 is a 2002 action-adventure video game developed by High Voltage Software and published by Sony Computer Entertainment for the PlayStation 2. The game serves as a prequel to the 2002 Disney film Lilo & Stitch. The game was released on June 19, 2002, two days before the theatrical release of the original film.

== Gameplay ==
Disney's Stitch: Experiment 626 is a basic platform game, with an environment for exploring, item finding, and fighting enemies. Plasma guns are the standard armaments. With his four arms, Stitch, known during the game's events as Experiment 626, can equip up to four at once, but only two when climbing or holding an object. There are two special weapons: a "Big Gun" that fires guided rockets that do massive damage and a Freeze Ray which coats enemies in ice. The game includes collectibles that the player must equip and find to progress throughout the game. Stitch is under the control of Jumba at the time of the game, and he orders Stitch to find DNA samples, which assist him in performing more experiments. Blue DNA count as one sample, while red DNA count as five samples. Squid bots allow the player to try and garner a "movie reel"; these 105 reels are used to buy various scenes from the film as well as previews. Stitch also can find gadgets to assist him in navigating the environment. Grapple guns are provided to allow Stitch to swing over hazardous substances or to reach difficult spots. A jet pack is also featured which can allow Stitch limited flight time.

The game has many enemies in Stitch's dangerous quest for DNA. These include United Galactic Federation soldiers, frogbots, heavy soldiers, Gantu's elite frogbots, mutant "greemas", and buzzers. Bosses include Dr. Habbitrale in his giant robot, Experiment 621 (after being mutated), and Gantu.

== Plot ==
The game is set before the events of Lilo & Stitch, with Experiment 626 being known as a galactic fugitive before he was put on trial.

The game begins with Jumba Jookiba showcasing his latest experiment: 626, who is proven to be superior compared to other experiments such as 621. Jumba assigns 626 to collect enough DNA from the world of the Greemas to create his 700 series of experiments. This catches the attention of the evil Dr. Habbitrale, a rival of Jumba who's been mutating Greemas. Dr. Habbitrale uses a gigantic mech to squish 626 but fails and is sent out through the airlock inside a hamster ball.

Now that the 700-series experiments are complete, 626 decides to get more DNA to power teleportation devices and get the United Galactic Federation soldiers out of Jumba's lab. As 626 feels that his quest for collecting DNA is complete, he and Jumba see 621 putting himself and the DNA in the mutator to prove his superiority. As a result, it enlarges 621 with a deformed body. After 626 defeats 621, Captain Gantu arrives and arrests the three.

Inside the prison, 626 rescues Jumba and they get inside Captain Gantu's ship. Inside the shaft of the ship, he encounters Gantu and defeats him. 626 and Jumba then steal a police cruiser ship that arrives and use it to escape. As Gantu, having recovered from his fight with 626, sees them escape. He vows to catch the "little trog" as 626 and Jumba fly off into space.

== Development ==
The game was originally planned to be titled Experiment 626: Stitch on the Loose and it was promoted under that title in Disney Adventures prior to its release.

== Reception ==
Disney's Stitch: Experiment 626

Aggregate scores
Aggregator	Score
GameRankings	63.59%
Metacritic	59/100

Review scores
Publication	Score
Computer and Video Games	5/10
Electronic Gaming Monthly	5.5/10
Game Informer	6/10
GameRevolution	C
GameSpot	5.7/10
GameSpy	3/5
GameZone	6.5/10
IGN	6/10
Official U.S. PlayStation Magazine	2.5/5

Edit on Wikidata

The game was met with mixed reception upon release; GameRankings gave it an aggregated review score of 63.59%, while Metacritic gave it 59 out of 100.
