= Unitus Labs =

Non-profit company providing microcredit in India

- Company type: Not-for profit company
- Industry: Financial services
- Predecessor: Unitus Inc.
- Founded: 2001; 24 years ago
- Headquarters: Seattle, Washington, United States
- Area served: India and South East Asia
- Services: Consulting to microcredit institutions
- Website: unitus.com

Unitus Labs is an American microcredit organization that worked to provide credit lines to aid in development, especially in India. It is structured as a non-profit. Unitus largely works as a consultant organization, working with other organizations that are microcredit providers.

It was the successor of Unitus Inc. and was heavily involved with SKS Microfinance. It is headquartered in Seattle, Washington with office in Bengaluru, India.

== History ==
It was originally organized in 2001.

In 2010, they also helped launch Patamar Capital (formerly known as Unitus Impact) to invest in companies to increase incomes and improve the lives of low-income communities in South and Southeast Asia using innovative business models.

In 2011, they launched Unitus Seed Fund which works to back businesses in India, one of which is a school system providing education to the rural poor in India.
