= Blowhorn =

Indian logistic company

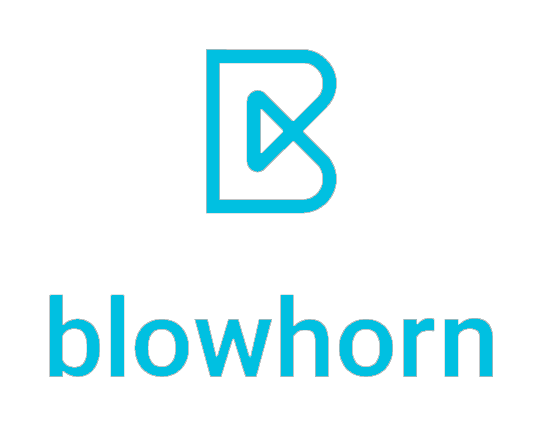
- Company type: Private
- Available in: English
- Founded: July 2014
- Headquarters: Bengaluru
- Area served: India
- Founders: Mithun Srivatsa, Nikhil Shivaprasad
- Key people: Mithun Srivatsa (CEO); Santosh Desai (CTO)
- Industry: Transportation and Logistics
- Services: Intra-city logistics; Mini-truck for hire
- Employees: 150 - 200
- Website: blowhorn.com
- Current status: Online
- Native clients on: Android, IOS

Blowhorn is an intra-city logistics provider headquartered in Bengaluru, India. It was founded in 2014 and currently operates in Bengaluru, Chennai, Hyderabad, Delhi NCR and Mumbai. The company connected customers with mini-truck drivers for intra-city, sub two-ton deliveries via its website and mobile app. In March 2017, Blowhorn secured series A round funding of Rs 25 crore from IDG Ventures India and the Michael & Susan Dell Foundation.

== History ==
Blowhorn was co-founded by Mithun Srivatsa and Nikhil Shivaprasad who have collectively worked in the logistics and technology space for more than a decade. In 2014, they founded Blowhorn to address what they believed to be a grossly unorganized sector in India - the mini-truck drivers. The mini-truck transportation market in India is estimated to be between Rs 30,000 to 60,000 crore ($6.8 to 9.6 billion) annually. The company has scaled to 160 employees and has aggregated 1.8 million mini-trucks in urban centres.

The company closed its series A round of venture capital funding in March 2017, raising Rs 25 crore ($3.65 million) from IDG Ventures India, the Michael & Susan Dell Foundation and existing investors Draper Associates and Unitus Seed Fund. The funds will be used in expanding Blowhorn's operations to eight other cities in the next 24 months, namely Kolkata, Kanpur and Indore, while aggregating 25,000 active drivers on a daily basis.

Blowhorn was the delivery partner for OnePlus mobile phones campaign in Bangalore wherein once the order for the handset placed through the Blowhorn mobile app was accepted, the handsets would be delivered to the customers within 60 minutes. The company has also worked in partnership with Uber.

Blowhorn has a customer service training program for its mini-truck drivers, aimed at unemployed youth in India.

== Recent financing ==
In November 2024, Catbus Infolabs Private Limited—the parent company behind Blowhorn—secured structured venture bridge financing through the private placement of unsecured, redeemable non-convertible debentures. The early-stage venture capital fund managed by Capria Ventures Advisors LLP subscribed to the issuance.
