= Spontaneous =

Spontaneous may refer to:

- Spontaneous abortion or miscarriage
- Spontaneous bacterial peritonitis
- Spontaneous combustion
- Spontaneous declaration
- Spontaneous emission
- Spontaneous fission
- Spontaneous generation
- Spontaneous human combustion
- Spontaneous Music Ensemble
- Spontaneous order
- Spontaneous process
- Spontaneous remission
- Spontaneous symmetry breaking
- Spontaneous (album) by William Parker & the Little Huey Creative Music Orchestra
- Spontaneous (film), an American romantic black comedy horror film

== See also ==
- Revolutionary spontaneity, also known as spontaneism, the belief that social revolution can and should occur spontaneously without the aid or guidance of a vanguard party.
