= Ohana =

Hawaiʻian cultural concept of kinship

ʻOhana is a Hawaiian term meaning "family" (in an extended sense of the term, including blood-related, adoptive or intentional). The term is cognate with the Māori word kōhanga, meaning "nest".

The root word ʻohā refers to the root or corm of the kalo (taro) plant, the staple "staff of life" in Hawaii, which Kanaka Maoli consider their cosmological ancestor.

== Usage ==
=== In Hawaii ===
- In contemporary Hawaiian real estate jargon, an "ʻohana unit" is a type of secondary suite. It may be part of a house or a separate structure on the same lot, and is intended to house a relative; it may not be rented to the general public.
- The Roman Catholic Diocese of Honolulu's Office for Social Ministry runs a food and housing program for vulnerable individuals and families called "ONE ʻOHANA: Food and Housing for All".

=== In popular culture ===
The word was popularised by Disney's 2002 film Lilo & Stitch and serves as the central theme throughout its franchise: "ʻOhana means family. Family means nobody gets left behind—or forgotten."

ʻOhana is used again in the 2025 live-action adaptation of Lilo & Stitch. In this film, the concept extends beyond biological family to include supporting characters David Kawena and his grandmother Tūtū, who eventually adopt Lilo themselves. Their adoption is referred to as "hānai" or "hānai-ohana", a form of adoptive relationship in Hawaiian tradition, as referenced by the character Mrs. Kekoa.

== See also ==
- Aloha
- Lānai
- Moai (social support groups)
- Tiki bar
- ʻAiga
- Whānau
