= Unitus Seed Fund =

Venture fund in Karnataka, India

Unitus Ventures
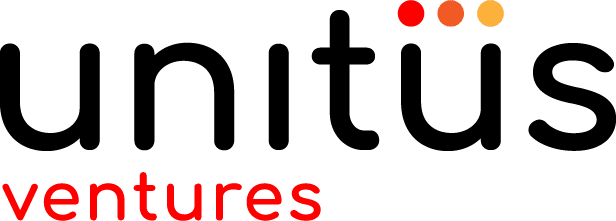
- Formerly: Unitus Seed Fund
- Type: Venture Capital Firm
- Industry: Finance, Investment
- Founded: 2012
- Headquarters: Bengaluru, Karnataka, India and Seattle, Washington U.S.
- Area served: India
- Key people: Srikrishna Ramamoorthy, Surya Manta
- AUM: USD 50 million
- Website: unitus.vc

Unitus Seed Fund (now Unitus Ventures) is a venture fund based in Bangalore and Seattle that supports early-stage tech startups with India scale and global potential. It funds early-stage Indian technology startups, primarily in the healthcare, education and financial sectors. As an impact investment fund, its focus is on startups that serve low and middle-income consumers.

== History ==
Unitus Seed Fund (now Unitus Ventures) was started in 2012 by Unitus Group, a financial services group founded in 2000 with the goal of making money while reducing global poverty. In the summer of 2012, Unitus Seed Fund spun out of Unitus Group as a separate venture investment management company and fund in order to scale-up investing operations. Its first fund was US$23 million and in 2016 it started raising a second fund with a target of US$50 million. Its early investors included Bill Gates, Vinod Khosla, and the Michael and Susan Dell Foundation.
