= Lilo & Stitch: Trouble in Paradise =

2002 video game

- North American cover art for the Windows version
- Developer: Blitz Games
- Publishers: Sony Computer Entertainment (PS); Disney Interactive (PC)
- Director: Craig Desjardins
- Producer: Team Enigma
- Designers: Tony Cartwright; Leigh Griffiths; Simon Little
- Programmers: Ian Bird; Kieren Bloomfield; Neil Campbell
- Artists: Chris Hamilton; Richard Jones; Robert Price
- Composer: John Guscott
- Platforms: PlayStation, Microsoft Windows
- Release: NA: June 18, 2002; EU: September 20, 2002 (PC); EU: September 27, 2002 (PS)
- Genres: Action, platformer
- Mode: Single-player

Disney's Lilo & Stitch: Trouble in Paradise (titled Disney's Lilo & Stitch for the American PlayStation release) is a 2002 action-platform video game developed by Blitz Games for PlayStation and Microsoft Windows. The game is a tie-in to and based on the Walt Disney Feature Animation film, Lilo & Stitch. The PlayStation version was published by Sony Computer Entertainment, while the Windows version was published by Disney Interactive Studios.

== Gameplay ==
The player controls either Lilo Pelekai or Stitch around Kauaʻi . Players must avoid and/or attack enemies and obstacles while traversing moving platforms and elaborate environments. Some levels require the player to collect a number of photographs, vinyl records, or communication devices before finishing them. In other levels, Lilo or Stitch must run away from Mertle Edmonds on her tricycle, Cobra Bubbles, or Jumba Jookiba and Pleakley.

Both characters can run, jump, and attack by jumping then slamming the ground. Lilo can also lift and carry red explosive pots and use voodoo spells to attack enemies, while Stitch can attack enemies by spitting or spinning. In addition, both characters can collect certain items that will allow them to use more powerful attacks; Lilo can find a "voodoo spoon" to summon a tourist from the sky to land on top of enemies, while Stitch can roll into enemies if he fills his "Bad-o-Meter" by drinking twenty cups of coffee.

== Reception ==
Reception

Aggregate scores
Aggregator	Score
GameRankings	PC: 62% PS1: 58%
Metacritic	PS1: 54/100

Review scores
Publication	Score
AllGame	3/5
GameSpot	3.8/10
GameSpy	3.5/5
GameZone	8.5/10
IGN	5/10
Official U.S. PlayStation Magazine	3.5/5

Edit on Wikidata

Trouble in Paradise was met with mixed reception. Review aggregator sites GameRankings and Metacritic gave the PlayStation version scores of 57.73% based on fifteen reviews and 54 out of 100 based on seven reviews, respectively. GameRankings gave the Windows version a 62% based on a single review.
