= Moai (social support groups) =

Japanese social support groups

Moais (模合, Mo-ai) are social support groups that form in order to provide varying support from social, financial, health, or spiritual interests. Moai means "meeting for a common purpose" in Japanese and originated from the social support groups in Okinawa, Japan. The concept of Moais have gained contemporary attention due to the Blue Zone research popularized by Dan Buettner. According to research, Moais are considered one of the leading factors of the longevity of lifespan of the Okinawan people, making the region among the highest concentration of centenarians in the world.

== See also ==
- Community
- Ohana
- Friendly society
