= List of Lilo & Stitch: The Series episodes =

Lilo & Stitch: The Series is an American animated television series produced by Walt Disney Television Animation that aired for 65 episodes over two seasons. Bookended by the animated films Stitch! The Movie (2003) and Leroy & Stitch (2006), it first aired between the ABC Kids programming block and Disney Channel from 2003 to 2006. It is the first television series in the Lilo & Stitch franchise and a sequel to the 2002 animated film Lilo & Stitch. In this series, Hawaiian girl Lilo Pelekai and her alien best friend and adopted "dog" Stitch adventure around the island of Kauai searching for, naming, and rehabilitating Stitch's predecessor "cousins", who are his creator Dr. Jumba Jookiba's 625 other genetic experiments.

Note that Stitch, Experiment 626, appears in every episode, so he is not included in the "Experiments mentioned" list. Experiments' numbers are based on those seen in the list of experiments shown in the credits of Leroy & Stitch. In addition, Reuben, Experiment 625, wasn't named until Leroy & Stitch and was only referred to as "625" throughout the show; his later-given name is only shown in the "Experiments mentioned" list for convenience. Some experiments were given incorrect numbers in certain episodes; these and other discrepancies are noted below.

The production codes and air dates are sourced from the United States Copyright Office unless otherwise stated.

== Series overview ==
Season	Episodes	Originally released		
Season	Episodes	First released	Last released	Network
Pilot film		August 26, 2003		Direct-to-video
1	39	September 20, 2003	February 28, 2004	Toon Disney; Disney Channel; ABC (ABC Kids)
2	26 (Note: 28 segments; episodes 23 and 24 ("Mrs. Hasagawa's Cats / Ace" and "Glitch / Woops") each contain two 11-minute segments)	November 5, 2004	July 29, 2006	Toon Disney; Disney Channel; ABC (ABC Kids)
Finale film		June 23, 2006		Disney Channel

== Pilot film ==
Title	Directed by	Written by	Direct-to-video release date
Stitch! The Movie	Tony Craig & Roberts Gannaway	Roberts Gannaway & Jess Winfield	August 26, 2003
Dr. Jumba Jookiba is kidnapped by Gantu on behalf of his former partner, Dr. Jacques von Hämsterviel, who desires the remaining 625 experiments which he helped finance. Lilo and Stitch discover the dehydrated pods containing the experiments, and after freeing one of them, they must search around the island to reclaim it to rescue Jumba.: Experiments mentioned (except those only seen as experiment pods): Jam (202), Sparky (221), Slimy (390), Mary (455), Huggo (489), Digger (529), Reuben (625), and 627

== Episodes ==
=== Season 1 (2003–2004) ===
No. overall	No. in season	Title	Directed by	Written by	Original release date	Prod. code
1	1	"Richter"	Victor Cook	Thomas Hart	September 20, 2003	106
An earthquake rocks the island, prompting Pleakley to study earthquake safety. When it is discovered that the earthquakes were caused by an experiment, Lilo and Stitch must travel underground to catch it before it cracks the Earth in half (and before Gantu catches it).: Experiments mentioned: Richter (513) and Reuben (625).
2	2	"Phantasmo"	Don MacKinnon	Henry Gilroy	September 27, 2003	110
Stitch wins an oyster containing a hidden experiment pod at a restaurant crane game. When the pod gets wet, however, the ghostly experiment possesses Scrump the doll and causes all sorts of mischief. When Stitch is blamed, he must prove himself innocent by catching the experiment in the act.: Experiment mentioned: Phantasmo (375).
3	3	"Clip"	Victor Cook	Kevin D. Campbell	October 4, 2003	112
After causing chaos at a beauty salon, Lilo and Stitch meet the hair-eating experiment that made Jumba nearly bald. However, when they try to use it to get revenge on Mertle for her cruel words, the hairball gets loose and threatens to eat up all the hair on the island. Meanwhile, Jumba regrows an afro and Gantu gets stuck dancing at a luau.: Experiment mentioned: Clip (177).
4	4	"Mr. Stenchy"	Victor Cook	Madellaine Paxson	October 11, 2003	107
Lilo rescues an irresistibly cute experiment, and Jumba warns her that the new experiment will release a terrible odor soon. However, Lilo discovers her hula classmates' affection towards the experiment, allowing her to be invited to Mertle's FHGH (Future Hawaiian Girls of Hawaii) tea party. Stitch is jealous of the attention received by "Mr. Stenchy" and allows Gantu to capture him, who in turn then develops his own affection for it.: Experiments mentioned: Mr. Stenchy (254) and Reuben (625).
5	5	"Spooky"	Don MacKinnon	Madellaine Paxson	October 12, 2003	102
Experiment 300 is discovered on Halloween, which can morph into a person's worst fear, so Lilo and Stitch must overcome their own in order to capture it.: Experiment mentioned: Spooky (300).
6	6	"Holio"	Don MacKinnon	Jim Peronto	October 12, 2003	116
Mertle receives a charm bracelet for her birthday, but one of the charms is actually an experiment pod. Lilo and Stitch must try to retrieve it before she gets it wet, or else the universe will be sucked into a black hole. Meanwhile, Nani must prepare for a company inspection.: Experiments mentioned: Holio (606).
7	7	"Cannonball"	Don MacKinnon	Kevin D. Campbell	October 13, 2003	104
A tsunami-creating experiment appears with the threat of endangering the entire world if it reaches the ocean. Lilo and Stitch must use the newly designed X-Buggy to capture it before Gantu does. Meanwhile, Lilo's hula halau participates in a sand-sculpting contest.: Experiments mentioned: Cannonball (520) and Reuben (625).
8	8	"Yapper"	Don MacKinnon	Catherine Lieuwen	October 13, 2003	108
Mertle gets a pet dog named "Gigi" and enters her in a dog show in Honolulu, so Lilo enters Stitch in the same dog show in hopes of beating Mertle and winning her friendship. Meanwhile, Jumba and Pleakley go sightseeing around the city and run into Gantu who is trying to capture an experiment in the area.: Experiments mentioned: Gigi (007) and Reuben (625).
9	9	"Yin-Yang"	Don MacKinnon	Henry Gilroy	October 17, 2003	105
Two experiments activate at the same time while Lilo and Stitch are arguing. Lilo and Stitch insist that they each can catch an experiment without the other. Meanwhile, Jumba and Pleakley make a bet to see whether Lilo or Stitch will capture an experiment first, and Gantu forces 625 to help him catch them both. The race is on as Jumba theorizes that if the two elementally opposing experiments touch each other, they will destroy the Earth.: Experiments mentioned: Yin (501), Yang (502), and Reuben (625).
10	10	"Kixx"	Victor Cook	Catherine Lieuwen	October 20, 2003	103
An experiment causes trouble by bullying people around the island, and a chemical reaction from a bad snack combination results in Stitch losing his ability to fight. Lilo must retrain him so that he can defeat "Kixx" before Gantu does.: Experiments mentioned: Kixx (601) and Reuben (625).
11	11	"Splodyhead"	Victor Cook	Henry Gilroy	October 24, 2003	117
In order to catch an experiment, Lilo, Stitch, Jumba, Pleakley, Gantu, and 625 travel to the island of Niʻihau. After becoming stranded on the beach under the threat of being blasted by "Splodyhead", the two opposing teams are forced to work together to survive.: Experiments mentioned: Splodyhead (619) and Reuben (625).
12	12	"Amnesio"	Don MacKinnon	Catherine Lieuwen	October 27, 2003	118
It is Lilo's birthday, but no one seems to remember. While handing out invitations for her party, Lilo and Stitch encounter an experiment that gives people amnesia, which causes them, plus Gantu, to lose their memories of each other. Now thinking that her name is Martha, Stitch is an escaped convict, and Gantu is her partner cop named Lenny, Lilo teams up with Gantu to hunt down Stitch and find clues to their lost memories.: Experiments mentioned: Gigi (007), Nosox (204), Poxy (222), Amnesio (303), Nodessertro (340), Sprout (509), and Kixx (601).
13	13	"Swirly"	Victor Cook	Brian Swenlin	November 3, 2003	129
A popular television show comes to Hawaii, just as a hypnotizing experiment is activated. Lilo dislikes the show, but under the experiment's spell, she is instructed to be more like Mertle, who happens to love the show. Stitch is also hypnotized and wants to be on the show. Hamsterviel orders Gantu to go on the show and use the experiment to hypnotize the audience, bringing them under Hamsterviel's power.: Experiments mentioned: Swirly (383), Cannonball (520), and Reuben (625).
14	14	"Fibber"	Don MacKinnon	Catherine Lieuwen	November 7, 2003	113
Pleakley's mother calls to inform him of his arranged marriage, so he lies that he is engaged to an Earth girl. When his family comes for the wedding, though, Pleakley must pretend that Nani is his fiancée. However, this proves trouble as Lilo and Stitch had just captured an experiment that loudly buzzes anytime it hears a lie.: Experiments mentioned: Fibber (032), Poxy (222), Sprout (509), Kixx (601), and Reuben (625).
15	15	"Tank"	Victor Cook	Madellaine Paxson	November 10, 2003	120
Lilo wins tickets to the Elizabethan Fair and invites the hula girls to join her. Mertle refuses to go, and Stitch is not allowed inside because no dogs are admitted, so they reluctantly team up to catch a metal-eating experiment.: Experiments mentioned: Tank (586) and Reuben (625).
16	16	"Sprout"	Victor Cook	Madellaine Paxson	November 14, 2003	111
Lilo makes a bet with Mertle to win the orchid competition at the Kokaua Town fair and steals a dangerous plant experiment against Jumba's warnings, while Pleakley grows a giant "Pinormous" pineapple, and Stitch practices being a cowboy for the rodeo. However, when the experiment gets loose and spreads its roots all over the fairgrounds, Stitch must defeat it cowboy-style.: Experiment mentioned: Sprout (509).
17	17	"Elastico"	Victor Cook	Cate Lieuwen	November 17, 2003	132
Lilo ignores Stitch while working on a new hula dance. Stitch finds an experiment performing as a circus entertainer and when he attempts to capture "Elastico", he is adopted as a circus performer himself.: Experiments mentioned: Topper (025), Clip (177), Sparky (221), Elastico (345), Yin (501), Yang (502), Richter (513), Cannonball (520), Slushy (523), Kixx (601), Yaarp (613), and Reuben (625).
18	18	"Yaarp"	Victor Cook	John Wray	November 21, 2003	122
Lilo's idea for an alien invasion alarm to improve the hula school is rejected, so she tries to write a letter to the mayor about it. Meanwhile, a loud experiment causes Stitch to temporarily lose his hearing, so the earless Pleakley is given the job of capturing the experiment himself. While Pleakley is off looking for "Yaarp", Gantu captures Stitch and will not let him free without a trade.: Experiment mentioned: Yaarp (613).
19	19	"627"	Don MacKinnon	Henry Gilroy	November 24, 2003	123
Stitch becomes egotistical after beating his experiment catching record, so Jumba decides to put him in his place by activating his brand new experiment, 627. Being more powerful than 626 with none of his weaknesses, Stitch may meet his match when 627 escapes Jumba's custody and falls into the hands of Gantu.: Experiments mentioned: Slimy (390), Deforestator (515), Eva (567), Zap (603), Launch (607), Reuben (625), 627, and 628.
20	20	"The Asteroid"	Victor Cook	Laura McCreary	December 1, 2003	109
Lilo and Stitch visit a planetarium and overhear Cobra Bubbles' warning of an asteroid set to impact Earth. With no one believing them or bothering to seek shelter, Stitch formulates a plan to go into outer space and destroy it to save the planet. However, when they discover that the asteroid itself is home to an alien, Lilo and Stitch must decide which home they must sacrifice for the sake of the other.: Experiments mentioned: Hammerface (033), (Note: Hammerface was misnumbered 124 in Stitch! The Movie and referred to as "Hammerhead" by Pleakley in "The Asteroid".) Sparky (221), Spooky (300), Swirly (383), Richter (513), Digger (529), and Kixx (601).
21	21	"Topper"	Don MacKinnon	Thomas Hart	December 5, 2003	114
It is Christmas Eve, and Lilo is trying to teach Stitch how Hawaiians celebrate Christmas. However, when Gantu has an experiment pod giftwrapped for Dr. Hämsterviel, everyone mistakes Stitch's hunt for the box as a selfish attempt to hoard presents for himself.: Experiments mentioned: Topper (025) and Reuben (625).
22	22	"Melty"	Don MacKinnon	Madellaine Paxson	December 8, 2003	134
While trying to catch a fire-breathing experiment, Lilo falls into a puddle of mud in front of her crush, Keoni. To erase her embarrassment, she uses Jumba's time-traveling invention to redo the encounter. Each time she tries to change the past, however, it creates a progressively worse future.: Experiments mentioned: Melty (228) and Reuben (625).
23	23	"Houdini"	Don MacKinnon	Brian Swenlin & John Wray	December 12, 2003	119
Stitch and Pleakley are hired to do a magic show at Mertle's "half-birthday" party. After their act turns out to be horrible, Lilo secretly activates an experiment that turns things invisible to help make the show a success. After they are hired to do their trick on national television, "Houdini" runs away, leaving Stitch invisible, so Lilo has to find them both. Meanwhile, 625 discovers the pod for the doomsday experiment 611, which Gantu takes the credit for.: Experiments mentioned: Fudgy (054), (Note: Mis-numbered 119 in the episode.) Yin (501), Yang (502), Cannonball (520), Kixx (601), Houdini (604), El Fin (611), Splodyhead (619), and Reuben (625).
24	24	"Sinker"	Victor Cook	Ken Koonce & Robert Martin	December 15, 2003	124
A small, purple shark-like experiment is destroying and sinking enemy ships with its large dorsal fin, so Lilo and Stitch must find a way to stop it before it destroys the cruise liners.: Experiments mentioned: Sinker (602) and Reuben (625).
25	25	"Nosy"	Don MacKinnon	Cate Lieuwen	December 19, 2003	128
Nani invites her prospective boss home to demonstrate the spirit of Ohana; Lilo also has a crush on the boss' son and is hoping to impress too. Unfortunately, before the visit, they find a new experiment who is designed to snoop around and dig up dirt on others, erupting chaos during the event.: Experiments mentioned: Nosy (199) and Reuben (625).
26	26	"Finder"	Don MacKinnon	Madellaine Paxson	December 22, 2003	130
Stitch becomes jealous of a new experiment with the ability to find anything when Lilo takes him to show-and-tell instead of Stitch. Meanwhile, Dr. Hämsterviel escapes from prison and travels to Earth, where he is "adopted" by Mertle. While the Grand Councilwoman offers to reinstate Gantu's position for the capture of Dr. Hämsterviel, Stitch strives to upstage "Finder" by finding him first.: Experiments mentioned: Finder (158), (Note: Mis-numbered 458 in the episode.) Yin (501), Yang (502), Richter (513), Cannonball (520), and Reuben (625).
27	27	"Slushy"	Victor Cook	Henry Gilroy	December 26, 2003	127
A blizzard-creating experiment chills the weather in Lilo's town during a very hot day, making it so cold that it starts to snow. After initially capturing "Slushy", they decide to take advantage of the new winter wonderland, which backfires once Slushy escapes.: Experiments mentioned: Slushy (523), Splodyhead (619), (Note: Mistakenly referred to as 515, the number of Deforestator, in the episode.) and Reuben (625).
28	28	"Dupe"	Victor Cook	Madellaine Paxson	December 29, 2003	126
Lilo hosts a slumber party, but none of her classmates from hula school come. When she finds an experiment that creates duplicates, she tries to duplicate herself, but Stitch saves her, and is duplicated instead. Stitch is weakened by the duplication when his strength is divided among all the clones, which Gantu takes advantage of, using a team of experiments to capture him.: Experiments mentioned: Hammerface (033), Dupe (344), Yin (501), Yang (502), Richter (513), Cannonball (520), Thresher (544), Heat (609), Plasmoid (617), and Reuben (625).
29	29	"Short Stuff"	Don MacKinnon	Henry Gilroy	January 2, 2004	133
Lilo takes Stitch to a carnival, but Stitch is too short for the rides. Meanwhile, a small crablike experiment that fouls up machinery is activated. Pleakley uses Jumba's invention to make Stitch grow, but he becomes giant-sized. The crab experiment too becomes a giant, threatening to wreak havoc on the carnival.: Experiments mentioned: Shortstuff (297) and Reuben (625).
30	30	"Angel"	Don MacKinnon	Cate Lieuwen	January 5, 2004	125
Stitch falls in love with the newest experiment they've encountered, 624, a female experiment dubbed "Angel", who Lilo is suspicious of. Unbeknownst to them, she is working with Gantu and possesses the ability to turn any previous experiment back to evil with her singing.: Experiments mentioned: Kernel (014), Sparky (221), Yin (501), Yang (502), Richter (513), Cannonball (520), Slushy (523), Kixx (601), Angel (624), and Reuben (625).
31	31	"Felix"	Don MacKinnon	Kevin D. Campbell	January 9, 2004	131
Lilo discovers a cleaning experiment that she names "Felix", initially becoming good friends with Pleakley, and proving to be incredibly useful around the house. However, Felix becomes so mad with cleaning he thinks everything around him is "dirty" and tries to destroy everyone.: Experiments mentioned: Felix (010), Cannonball (520), and Reuben (625).
32	32	"Poxy"	Victor Cook	Thomas Hart	January 11, 2004	101
A small microbe-like experiment is unintentionally eaten by Pleakley, causing a peculiar illness that gives him purple pimples, a swollen eye, extremely smelly feet, and uncontrollable burping. Lilo and Stitch must capture the experiment and remove it from within Pleakley by shrinking to microscopic size.: Experiments mentioned: Poxy (222) and Reuben (625).
33	33	"Hunkahunka"	Don MacKinnon	Chad F. Rogers	January 11, 2004	121
It is Valentine's Day, and Lilo uses an experiment that makes people fall in love to make Keoni fall in love with her. However, when it gets loose over the island, Stitch must catch the experiment before Gantu does.: Experiments mentioned: Hunkahunka (323).
34	34	"Sample"	Don MacKinnon	Thomas Hart	January 11, 2004	139
Stitch is afraid of going to the vet and ends up meeting an experiment that can repeat any sound. At the same time, two alien hunters grow suspicious of Stitch and the other aliens and attempt to capture them.: Experiments mentioned: Sample (258) and Reuben (625).
35	35	"Baby-Fier"	Victor Cook	Cate Lieuwen & Kevin D. Campbell	January 12, 2004	136
An experiment that turns people into babies activates and turns Stitch, Nani, Jumba, Pleakley, and Gantu into babies. With Lilo the only "adult", she struggles having to take care of all of them, while also developing an antidote, with Baby Stitch and Baby Gantu battling for the experiment.: Experiments mentioned: Babyfier (151) and Reuben (625).
36	36	"Bonnie & Clyde"	Don MacKinnon	Henry Gilroy	January 16, 2004	135
After being grounded for being rowdy, Lilo and Stitch sneak out of their room and meet a criminal experiment duo, who urges them to do whatever they want. They initially embrace this reckless lifestyle alongside "Bonnie" and "Clyde", until they begin to realize the consequences of their actions, and attempt to try and capture the crooks to redeem themselves.: Experiments mentioned: Bonnie (149), (Note: Mis-numbered 349 in the episode.) Clyde (150), (Note: Mis-numbered 350 in the episode.) and Reuben (625).
37	37	"Slugger"	Victor Cook	Madellaine Paxson	January 26, 2004	138
Lilo's baseball team loses to Mertle's team, due to Pleakley's lack of competence. Later, Lilo and Mertle make a bet for another game and that whoever wins will get the other player's personal items. A yellow, pterosaur-like experiment activates that is designed to deflect projectiles with his tail shaped like a baseball bat, so Lilo decides to place him on their team in Pleakley's place, in hopes of beating Mertle's team. However, in retaliation, Mertle places Gantu on their team, and instead changes it to a basketball game.: Experiments mentioned: Yin (501), Yang (502), Richter (513), Kixx (601), Slugger (608), Splodyhead (619), and Reuben (625).
38	38	"Bad Stitch"	Victor Cook	Jan Strnad	January 30, 2004	115
Nani has been receiving a lot of bills for Stitch's destruction, so she gets Lilo to try and train him to be more civilized (otherwise he would be thrown out of the ʻohana). When Lilo's attempts prove to be unsuccessful, Stitch decides to leave and ends up being kidnapped by Dr. Hämsterviel, who plans to turn him evil again.: Experiment mentioned: Reuben (625).
39	39	"Drowsy"	Victor Cook	Thomas Hart & John Wray	February 28, 2004	137
Stitch uses an experiment to get a restless Lilo to sleep, but cannot wake her up the next day. While he is forced to use her sleeping body as a puppet to complete her responsibilities, Gantu is instructed to capture the experiment and kidnap the vacationing Regis Philbin.: Experiments mentioned: Stopgo (102), (Note: Mis-numbered 239 in the episode; this experiment does not appear until Leroy & Stitch.) Finder (158), Nosox (204), Alexander (274), Drowsy (360), Sinker (602), Houdini (604), and Reuben (625).

=== Season 2 (2004–2006) ===
No. overall	No. in season	Title	Directed by	Written by	Original release date	Prod. code
40	1	"Spike"	Tony Craig	John Wray	November 5, 2004	201 (Note: The U.S. copyright registrations of "Spike" and "Frenchfry" both list their production codes as 201, with the registration for "Spike" not showing the episode's title. It is presumed that 201 applies only to "Spike" while the production code for "Frenchfry" is actually 204 unless further evidence proves otherwise.)
Lilo wants to beat Mertle at the "‘Ohana Rama" family trivia contest, but loses confidence when Stitch is poked by a porcupine-like experiment whose quills makes people 99% goofy and 1% clever. Meanwhile, Pleakley starts a therapy group named "E.A.R.W.A.X" to rehabilitate experiments.: Experiments mentioned: Fibber (032), Spot (099), Squeak (110), Bonnie (149), Clyde (150), Nosy (199), Spike (319), Slushy (523), Yaarp (613), and Splodyhead (619).
41	2	"Frenchfry"	Victor Cook	Madellaine Paxson	November 12, 2004	204
After Nani bans junk food, Lilo and Stitch encounter an experiment that cooks delicious cuisine. Little do they know, they will be unable to stop eating because his food never fills people up, no matter how much they eat, as he is actually trying to fatten them up so that he can eat them himself.: Experiments mentioned: Frenchfry (062) and Reuben (625).
42	3	"Swapper"	Victor Cook	Madellaine Paxson	November 19, 2004	202
Lilo meets a new friend named Victoria who also joins Lilo's hula class. Mertle tries to stop her from befriending the "weird" Lilo, so Lilo puts on a party to prove she isn't. However, an experiment appears that switches people's minds, which results in Lilo and Stitch, and Jumba and Pleakley switching bodies. From Stitch's body, Lilo must make sure the party is successful, while Stitch has to pretend to be her.: Experiments mentioned: Swapper (355) and Reuben (625).
43	4	"Shoe"	Tony Craig	Kevin D. Campbell	December 10, 2004	203
When Nani ends up short on cash, the rest of the ‘ohana decide to start a "Bed and Not Breakfast" to bring in extra money. An experiment designed to bring bad luck threatens to ruin the business, until Jumba remembers that its effect can be reversed to turn very bad luck into very good luck.: Experiments mentioned: Poki (036), Backhoe (040), Shoe (113), Yin (501), Deforestator (515), Kixx (601), and Reuben (625).
44	5	"Slick"	Rob LaDuca	Heather Lombard & Evan Gore	January 7, 2005	205
Lilo and Stitch compete with Mertle to sell the most candy bars for their hula halau. The competition turns fierce when a slick-talking experiment appears that has the ability to sell anything, which both parties attempt to take advantage of.: Experiments mentioned: Slick (020) and Reuben (625).
45	6	"Skip"	Victor Cook	John Wray	February 11, 2005	206
Tired of childhood restrictions, Lilo uses an experiment that skips time ahead ten years in the future to turn herself into a teenager, and then into an adult. However, while she and Stitch disappear for those twenty years, Dr. Hämsterviel captures the experiments and takes over the world.: Experiments mentioned: Clink (086), Skip (089), Shoe (113), Clog (143), Finder (158), Cheney (205), Sparky (221), Connie (396), Brad (499), Strata (532), and Reuben (625).
46	7	"Checkers"	Rob LaDuca	Cate Lieuwen	March 4, 2005	207
Lilo's hula halau is building a Merrie Monarch parade float, and Lilo is upset that the others do not like her ideas. However, when a crown-shaped experiment sits on her head, which she calls "Checkers", its power causes everyone to treat her like a Queen. She eventually realizes her power-hungry approach, only for Gantu to then take the power for himself.: Experiments mentioned: Checkers (029), Backhoe (040), Clip (177), Sparky (221), Spooky (300), Elastico (345), Yin (501), Richter (513), Deforestator (515), Cannonball (520), Digger (529), Kixx (601), Holio (606), Splodyhead (619), and Reuben (625).
47	8	"PJ"	Rob LaDuca	Kevin D. Campbell	April 1, 2005	209
When Lilo is blamed for pranking her strict substitute hula teacher, she decides to use a practical-jokester experiment to get revenge and impress Mertle. Stitch must stop them before the jokes go too far.: Experiments mentioned: Gigi (007), PJ (133), and Drowsy (360).
48	9	"Ploot"	Victor Cook	Heather Lombard & Evan Gore	April 22, 2005	217
Lilo tries to clean Pudge's grotto for Earth Day, but meets an experiment that eats trash and later redistributes it across the island as pollutant goo. When Stitch gets sick from eating trash, Lilo must find a way to stop "Ploot" by herself.: Experiments mentioned: Slick (020), Babyfier (151), Finder (158), Sparky (221), Drowsy (360), Ploot (505), Richter (513), Deforestator (515), Kixx (601), and Sinker (602).
49	10	"Snooty"	Rob LaDuca	Madellaine Paxson	May 13, 2005	213
Victoria becomes afraid of an experiment after it attacks her and thinks that it is a vampire. Lilo tries to explain that she can capture it and turn it good, but after it puts Stitch out of commission, Victoria decides to team up with Gantu to "slay" the experiment.: Experiments mentioned: Snooty (277), Phantasmo (375), and Reuben (625).
50	11	"Retro"	Rob LaDuca	Story by : Dana Landsberg; Teleplay by : John Behnke & Rob Humphrey	May 20, 2005	214
Nani's middle school friends return to Kaua‘i and, thinking that Nani is vice president of the business she works for, invites her and her ʻohana on a yacht cruise. Meanwhile, Stitch encounters an experiment that reverts objects, animals, and even people to a primitive state, as well as turning Lilo and the others into cavemen.: Experiment mentioned: Retro (210).
51	12	"Belle"	Rob LaDuca	David Warick & Amy Debartolomeis	June 3, 2005	216
While out trying to prove the existence of the Nightmarchers (an ancient Hawaiian legend), Lilo, Stitch, Mertle, Jumba, and Pleakley tell each other scary stories. Meanwhile, Gantu is in pursuit of an experiment.: Experiment mentioned: Belle (248).
52	13	"Morpholomew"	Victor Cook	Brandon Sawyer	July 1, 2005	227
Keoni is going away for the weekend, so Lilo uses a shape-shifting experiment to transform into him, to try and win the island's skateboarding competition's grand prize. At the same time, Jake, Trixie, Spud, Gramps, and Fu Dog visit the island to check out reports that "magical creatures" are running rampant, with Jake then being confused for the shapeshifting experiment.: Experiment mentioned: Morpholomew (316), Jacob (446), and Reuben (625).; Note: This is a crossover between Lilo & Stitch: The Series and American Dragon: Jake Long.
53	14	"Spats"	Victor Cook	Heather Lombard & Evan Gore	August 12, 2005	210
The Proud Family comes to visit Hawaii and stay in the "Bed and Not Breakfast" for their visit. However, an experiment which causes people to argue with each other runs loose, disrupting the relaxation attempts, as Lilo and Penny team up to catch it.: Experiment mentioned: Spats (397) and Reuben (625).; Note: This is a crossover between Lilo & Stitch: The Series and The Proud Family.
54	15	"Heckler"	Victor Cook	Laura McCreary	August 22, 2005	218
Nani is having trouble organizing a charity dinner, so Pleakley offers to help entertain by providing stand-up comedy. However, when an experiment designed to mock people appears and leads Lilo down the wrong path, she and Stitch have to stop him before his heckling ruins the event.: Experiments mentioned: Heckler (322) and Reuben (625).
55	16	"Wishy-Washy"	Victor Cook	Madellaine Paxson	August 23, 2005	222
It is nearly graduation for hula school, and everyone needs to have a picture with their parents, but Lilo does not have parents. When she meets an experiment designed to make wishes, she decides to use it to try to get Nani and David married, only for its wishes to increasingly backfire.: Experiments mentioned: Wishy-Washy (267) and Reuben (625).
56	17	"Phoon"	Victor Cook	Brandon Sawyer	August 24, 2005	211
Lilo quits experiment hunting to go to Hula Hip Hop Fusion school. Meanwhile, a windblasting experiment is unleashed, and Jumba's new device causes it to mutate into a giant monster, which Stitch must defeat. Meanwhile, due to a bad blow to the head, Gantu thinks that 625 and Hämsterviel are just figments of his imagination.: Experiments mentioned: Phoon (540) and Reuben (625).
57	18	"Bugby"	Victor Cook	Thomas Hart	August 25, 2005	224
Lilo builds a town called Bugapolis for her new friends in her bug collection, but Stitch keeps trying to eat the citizens. One of them turns out to be an experiment with the ability to turn others into bugs, turning Lilo, Stitch, Jumba, and Pleakley into ones. With the help of bugs named Chaps, Manny, and Sperk, they have to find a way to change themselves back soon, because Nani has called an exterminator.: Experiment mentioned: Bugby (128).
58	19	"Rufus"	Victor Cook	Jim Peronto	August 26, 2005	208
When Stitch is kidnapped by Dr. Drakken, Pleakley calls on the help of Kim Possible to rescue him. Although they initially both want the other to step aside, Lilo and Kim must work together to accomplish this goal. Meanwhile, Jumba believes Ron's pet mole rat Rufus is actually the dangerous reality warping Experiment 607.: Experiment mentioned: Launch (607).; Note: This is a crossover between Lilo & Stitch: The Series and Kim Possible.
59	20	"Shush"	Rob LaDuca	Jim Peronto	August 26, 2005	223
An experiment designed to collect private enemy conversations through its tail is accidentally activated by Lilo. She eavesdrops on Mertle, believing she hates her friends, causing them to stop hanging out. In retaliation, Mertle decides to willingly help catch experiments for Hämsterviel.: Experiments mentioned: Shush (234) and Reuben (625).
60	21	"Lax"	Rob LaDuca	Mark Drop	January 16, 2006	219
The Recess gang visits Kauaʻi so Gretchen can use a telescope to examine what she believes is a new planet. Meanwhile, an experiment designed to make people stop working zaps Stitch, Jumba, and Pleakley with its lazy beam. Lilo must now team up with the students to try and catch the experiment, before they are all effected by the ray.: Experiments mentioned: Lax (285) and Reuben (625).; Note: This is a crossover between Lilo & Stitch: The Series and Recess.
61	22	"Remmy"	Victor Cook	Jim Peronto	April 14, 2006	215
It is the anniversary of Lilo's parents' death, and Lilo takes a nap to deal with her sadness about losing them. However, when an experiment enters her dreams and tries to dissolve them into nightmares, Stitch, Jumba, and Pleakley go in after it to capture it before she wakes up. Meanwhile, Nani tries to find a way to make Lilo feel happy again.: Experiments mentioned: Felix (010) Slick (020), Hamlette (024), Fibber (032) Hammerface (033), Poki (036), Backhoe (040), Frenchfry (062), Squeak (110), Shoe (113), Carmen (123), Sparky (221), Melty (228), Remmy (276), Dupe (344), Elastico (345), Drowsy (360), Yin (501), Yang (502), Deforestator (515), Cannonball (520), Slushy (523), Thresher (544), Houdini (604), Heat (609), Yaarp (613), Angel (624), Reuben (625), and 627.
62	23	"Mrs. Hasagawa's Cats"	Rob LaDuca	Heather Lombard & Evan Gore	May 19, 2006	220
62	23	"Ace"	Rob LaDuca	John Wray	May 19, 2006	221
After trying to help Mrs. Hasagawa out with several jobs, Lilo and Stitch discover that her house is filled with stray experiments which she believes are "cats", so try to gather them all.: Experiments mentioned in "Mrs. Hasagawa's Cats": Doubledip (002), Hamlette (024), Gotchu (031), Forehead (044), Hocker (051), Zawp (077), Fetchit (090), Mulch (111), Shredder (134), Geigenstein (201), Pix (214), Snooty (277), Boomer (288), Manners (358), Woody (507), Wrapper (521), Blowhard (533), Derrick (566), and Reuben (625).; The leader of the Evil Genius Organization (EGO) believes that Jumba has turned good and wants to revoke his membership, but Lilo convinces him to visit Earth so that they can prove that Jumba is still worthy of membership. As they construct an elaborate facade to trick him, however, a failed non-evil experiment is activated.: Experiments mentioned in "Ace": Ace (262), Yin (501), Yang (502), Sprout (509), Richter (513), Deforestator (515), Slushy (523), Kixx (601), Holio (606), Splodyhead (619), Reuben (625), and 627.
63	24	"Glitch"	Rob LaDuca	John Wray	June 23, 2006	225
63	24	"Woops"	Rob LaDuca	Heather Lombard & Evan Gore	June 23, 2006	226
Lilo is tired of doing chores and asks Jumba to build a machine to help her, so he ends up upgrading the entire house to do the chores itself. However, when an experiment designed to turn technology against its user enters the computer control system, Stitch must fight the house to rescue everyone.: Experiments mentioned in "Glitch": Glitch (223) and Slugger (608).; A clumsy experiment causes Dr. Hämsterviel to nearly be caught by his prison guards, so he returns all the captured experiments to Gantu for safekeeping. However, when he gives the trouble-making experiment to Lilo and Stitch, it threatens to ruin Pleakley's chance at a domino championship.: Experiments mentioned in "Woops": Felix (010), Gotchu (031), Fibber (032), Hammerface (033), Forehead (044), Zawp (077), Mulch (111), Nosy (199), Retro (210), Boomer (288), Amnesio (303), Blowhard (533), Woops (600), and Reuben (625).
64	25	"Snafu"	Victor Cook	Jess Winfield	June 23, 2006	228
When Lilo and Stitch learn from Nosy that all the experiments captured by Gantu are imprisoned in his ship (as a result of the events of "Woops"), the two plan a rescue mission to free them. However, they accidentally activate an experiment designed to destroy complex plans. As Lilo and Stitch form a rescue team regardless, Jumba and Pleakley try to understand the meaning of love, and Gantu tries to use Angel's song to turn the experiments evil again.: Experiments mentioned: Felix (010), Fibber (032), Hammerface (033), Fudgy (054), Stamen (103), Snafu (120), Bonnie (149), Clyde (150), Finder (158), Nosy (199), Nosox (204), Sparky (221), Poxy (222), Sample (258), Tickle-Tummy (275), (Note: Tickle-Tummy did not have her number stated in either Lilo & Stitch: The Series or Leroy & Stitch, and was accidentally left off the experiments list in the latter. The Stitch! anime series has since confirmed that the experiment's number is 275, while Wormhole, who was initially given 275 in Leroy & Stitch and also later appeared in the anime, is now numbered 272.) Amnesio (303), Hunkahunka (323), Dupe (344), Slimy (390), Slushy (523), Thresher (544), Tank (586), Woops (600), Zap (603), Houdini (604), Holio (606), Heat (609), Plasmoid (617), Angel (624), and Reuben (625).
65	26	"Link"	Rob LaDuca	John Behnke & Rob Humphrey	July 29, 2006	212
When Lilo and Mertle are forced to work together to find buried treasure, an experiment appears that binds together uncooperative people with indestructible, rubberlike slime. Mertle is forced to help Lilo catch the experiment, while Stitch becomes stuck to Nani, and Jumba becomes stuck to Pleakley.: Experiments mentioned: Link (251), Char (412), Botulator (413), Crusty (414), Patter (415), and Reuben (625).

== Television finale film ==
Title	Directed by	Written by	Original release date	DVD release date
Leroy & Stitch	Tony Craig & Roberts Gannaway	Roberts Gannaway & Jess Winfield	June 23, 2006	June 27, 2006
Lilo, Stitch, Jumba, and Pleakley have finally caught all of Jumba's genetic experiments and found the one true place where each of them belongs. Stitch, Jumba, and Pleakley are offered positions in the Galactic Alliance, turning them down so that they can stay on Earth with Lilo. However, Lilo realizes that her alien friends have places where they belong, and it is finally time to say "aloha". Meanwhile, Gantu has left Earth and broken Dr. Jacques von Hämsterviel out of prison, who is planning to create and clone a new experiment named "Leroy", one that will allow him to take over the galaxy.: Experiments mentioned: Shrink (001) through 627, and Leroy (629) (Note: Leroy was not given a number in his debut. He was eventually given the number 629 in June 2020 via a Disney Tsum Tsum-themed side story of the manga Stitch & the Samurai.)
