= Leroy & Stitch =

2006 film by Tony Craig and Bobs Gannaway

- DVD and digital distribution cover
- Directed by: Tony Craig; Bobs Gannaway
- Written by: Bobs Gannaway; Jess Winfield
- Based on: Characters by Chris Sanders; Dean DeBlois
- Produced by: Igor Khait (line producer); Kurt Weldon (line producer); Jess Winfield (executive producer); Tony Craig (executive producer); Bobs Gannaway (executive producer)
- Starring: Chris Sanders; Daveigh Chase; David Ogden Stiers; Jeff Bennett; Kevin Michael Richardson; Kevin McDonald; Rob Paulsen
- Edited by: Tony Mizgalski
- Music by: J. A. C. Redford
- Production company: Walt Disney Television Animation
- Distributed by: Buena Vista Home Entertainment (Note: Released through the Walt Disney Pictures banner.)
- Release dates: June 23, 2006 (TV); June 27, 2006 (DVD)
- Running time: 73 minutes
- Country: United States
- Language: English

Leroy & Stitch (Note: Titled as Disney's Leroy & Stitch on its title card and stylized as Leroy ~~Lilo~~ & Stitch on its cover art.) is a 2006 American direct-to-video animated science fiction comedy film produced by Walt Disney Television Animation. It was written by Bobs Gannaway and Jess Winfield, the latter of whom additionally served as producer alongside Igor Khait, and directed by Gannaway and Tony Craig. It is the fourth feature film in the Lilo & Stitch franchise and the third and final sequel feature film to the 2002 film, serving as the finale to Lilo & Stitch: The Series, concluding the franchise's main animated continuity with Lilo Pelekai as a main character and Hawaii as the main setting. The film debuted on Disney Channel on June 23, 2006, and was also aired on Toon Disney on June 26, 2006.

== Plot ==
With their mission to capture and repurpose Jumba's experiments completed, (Note: As depicted in Lilo & Stitch: The Series (2003–2006)) Lilo, Stitch, Jumba, and Pleakley are honored as heroes by the Galactic Alliance. Jumba is offered to return to his old laboratory, Pleakley is offered a post as chairman of Earth Studies at Galactic Alliance Community College, Stitch is made the Captain of the Galactic Armada and commander of the Big Red Battleship 9000 (BRB-9000) and Lilo is made the Galactic Federation's ambassador to Earth and the experiments' guardian. The aliens initially decline the offers for Lilo's sake, but she later lets them go after seeing how much they long for their new adventures. Before they leave, Lilo gives Jumba her favorite Elvis Presley record, Pleakley a small rock to use as a paperweight and Stitch a necklace with a Kū tiki.

While they enjoy what they are honored for, the quartet begin to feel sad due to their separation. Meanwhile, their arch-nemesis Gantu, having failed to capture Jumba's experiments, decides to break his boss Dr. Jacques von Hämsterviel out of prison, abandoning Experiment 625 in the process. Once freed, Hämsterviel enlists Gantu to help him with his newest scheme to take over the galaxy upon learning of Jumba's current status. He starts off by intruding the lab, where he captures Jumba and forces him to create a new Stitch-like experiment that he dubs Leroy. Stitch, on assignment to recapture Hämsterviel, arrives and duels Leroy, but is defeated and imprisoned in a capsule just as Pleakley arrives to visit Jumba, only to be captured by Hämsterviel as well. Hämsterviel then clones Leroy for an army to conquer the Galactic Alliance. Before leaving for Turo, Hämsterviel continues with his plan in which he sets up a deathtrap for Stitch, Jumba and Pleakley by locking them in Pleakley's vehicle and sending it toward a black hole.

On Earth, Lilo arrives at Gantu's ship, where finds 625 and asks to use the videophone to contact Stitch, but it is not functional. Lilo, upon seeing 625 emotionally hurt, consoles and names him "Reuben" before he repairs the videophone. Lilo contacts the BRB-9000 to reach Stitch. Leroy, now in control of the ship, impersonates Stitch, but Lilo sees through his ruse upon noticing he is not wearing Stitch's tiki necklace, much to the delight of Hämsterviel, who thinks his plan is working perfectly. After Gantu reminds Hämsterviel of the threat of the other 624 experiments, he adds a brand new part of his plan by commanding Leroy to capture them as soon as possible so he can destroy all of them. Realizing Stitch is in danger, Lilo and Reuben work together to repair Gantu's ship and fly to Turo, but learn that Hämsterviel is responsible for Stitch's current predicament and has already put his plan to take over the galaxy into action. He then orders Gantu to imprison the duo.

As the G.A.C.C. vehicle heads towards the black hole, Stitch escapes his capsule and frees Jumba and Pleakley. He then throws Pleakley's rock into the black hole, disrupting its event horizon and enabling them to escape. On Earth, Leroy obtains Lilo's scrapbook of the experiments (Note: The scrapbook was first seen in the Lilo & Stitch: The Series episode "Snafu", which first aired just before Leroy & Stitch premiered.) and captures them and Lilo's rival, Mertle Edmonds, and reports it to Hämsterviel afterwards. Admiring Leroy's potential, Hämsterviel fires Gantu before setting off to Earth to finish his plan by destroying the 624 experiments. After having a change of heart, Gantu helps Lilo and Reuben escape and they return to Earth in the G.A.C.C. vehicle. Leroy and Hämsterviel gather the experiments at Aloha Stadium and prepare to destroy them with the BRB-9000's cannon. The heroes arrive and destroy the cannon, but Hämsterviel unleashes the Leroys, who overwhelm the other experiments in a massive battle. Jumba then remembers that he programmed a secret shutdown command into Leroy during his creation that can be activated when he hears Elvis Presley's rendition of "Aloha ʻOe". They soon interrupt the battle to perform the song, triggering the Leroys' command and incapacitating them all.

As the team is again honored by the alliance for their victory, Stitch, Jumba and Pleakley ask to return to Earth with Lilo. The Grand Councilwoman grants this and reinstates Gantu as the captain of the Armada and new commander of the BRB-9000. Gantu names Reuben his new galley officer. Back on Earth, Lilo sets up for one last ʻohana photo with her family and Mertle to complete her scrapbook. In a final scene, a re-incarcerated Hämsterviel is shown with the Leroys in cells surrounding his. During the credits, a nearly-full list of Jumba's experiments is shown. (Note: The list shows only the experiments from Experiment 001, Shrink, to Experiment 626, Stitch. It does not include Experiment 627 (who is mentioned when Jumba suggests that Hämsterviel just numbers Leroy as 627, only for Gantu to remind Jumba that 627 was already created), Experiment 628 (who only appeared at the end of the episode "627" in pod form), 629/Leroy (who wasn't officially numbered 629 until 2020 through a special one-off chapter of the manga Stitch & the Samurai), Skunkuna (an unnumbered experiment from Stitch! who is said to have been made by Hämsterviel, contradicting Jumba being the experiments' creator) and Experiment 000 (an experiment who was introduced in Stitch! as the predecessor to all of the other experiments). Furthermore, 275/Tickle-Tummy, an experiment who was introduced in "Snafu", was accidentally left off the list; her number in the list was taken by Wormhole, an experiment who was later introduced in Stitch! and is actually numbered as Experiment 272.)

== Voice cast ==
- Chris Sanders as the titular characters:
  - Stitch (Experiment 626): A blue koala-like genetic experiment designed to cause mischief who becomes a captain of the Galactic Armada in the United Galactic Federation (referred to as the "Galactic Alliance" in this film and the preceding series) as a reward for capturing and rehabilitating his "cousins" (Jumba's other experiments).
  - Leroy (Experiment 629): (Note: Leroy wasn't numbered in the film; he was later designated Experiment 629 via a Disney Tsum Tsum-based side story of Stitch & the Samurai released in June 2020, nearly fourteen years after the release of this film.) A red koala-like genetic experiment, effectively Stitch's twin brother, made by Jumba from Stitch's template while under threat from Hämsterviel and Gantu. Serving as Hämsterviel's new lackey, he gets cloned after creation to give Hämsterviel a personal army.
- Daveigh Chase as Lilo Pelekai: The Hawaiian girl who adopted Stitch and reformed the other experiments along with him. Designated as the experiments' caretaker and Earth's ambassador in the UGF, she is forced to say "aloha" (as in goodbye) to the main alien members of her ʻohana, but must reunite with them after discovering Hämsterviel's escape from prison. This film marks Chase's final performance as Lilo before her death in 2026.
- David Ogden Stiers as Dr. Jumba Jookiba: The Kweltikwan mad scientist who created Stitch and the other genetic experiments. He was given back access to his laboratory as a reward for capturing and rehabilitating his experiments, but later gets forced by Hämsterviel and Gantu to make a new experiment.
- Jeff Bennett as:
  - Dr. Jacques von Hämsterviel: A rodent-like alien who was Jumba's former partner-in-crime. He gets freed from Galactic Prison by his henchman Gantu and forces Jumba to create an experiment who is subservient to him, leading to Leroy's creation. He uses the new experiment to take over the UGF and capture the first 624 experiments to destroy them.
  - The following genetic experiments:
    - Fibber (Experiment 032), a red, big-headed, living lie detector experiment.
    - Slick (Experiment 020), a purple, Southern U.S.-accented salesman experiment.
    - Ace (Experiment 262), a red superheroic experiment.
    - Remmy (Experiment 276), a blue, dream-eating and nightmare-inducing experiment.
- Kevin Michael Richardson as Gantu: A giant and whale-like alien who was formerly the captain of the Galactic Armada and is Hämsterviel's henchman. He frees Hämsterviel from prison and helps him force Jumba to create Leroy, but gets fired after Hämsterviel finds the experiment to be more effective.
- Kevin McDonald as Wendy Pleakley: The Plorgonarian "Earth expert" and former UGF agent who is rewarded the role of chairman of Earth studies at Galactic Alliance Community College for helping capture and rehabilitate Jumba's experiments.
- Rob Paulsen as:
  - Reuben (Experiment 625): A yellow marmot and koala-like genetic experiment who has the same powers of his predecessor Stitch (plus better English fluency) and loves sandwiches. After his partner Gantu abandons him, he helps Lilo in reuniting with Stitch, Jumba, and Pleakley and saving the galaxy from Hämsterviel and Leroy.
  - The following other genetic experiments:
    - Felix (Experiment 010), a green-furred cleaning experiment.
    - Squeak (Experiment 110), a red, talkative and mouse-like experiment.
    - Forehead (Experiment 044), a pink and four-headed barbershop quartet experiment.
- Zoe Caldwell as the Grand Councilwoman: The leader of the United Galactic Federation/Galactic Alliance.
- Tia Carrere as Nani Pelekai: Lilo's older sister and legal guardian.
- Ving Rhames as Cobra Bubbles: A former CIA agent. He only cameos as a voice message in this film.
- Liliana Mumy as Mertle Edmonds: Lilo's hula classmate and rival and the owner of Gigi (Experiment 007).
- Tara Strong as:
  - Angel (Experiment 624): A pink koala-like experiment who can sing a siren song that changes predecessor experiments' morality and is Stitch's girlfriend.
  - Babyfier (Experiment 151), a pink experiment who can convert beings into infants.
  - Belle (Experiment 248), a teal experiment who can scream loudly.
  - Dupe (Experiment 344), an orange-furred cloning experiment. (He was not used for cloning Leroy.)
  - Pleakley's unnamed G.A.C.C. assistant
- Frank Welker (uncredited) as:
  - Sparky (Experiment 221), a yellow electrokinectic experiment.
  - Sprout (Experiment 509), a large Venus flytrap-like experiment.
  - Mr. Stenchy (Experiment 254), a cute pink experiment who can produce a foul stench, which is considered a delicacy by Plorgonarians.
  - Kixx (Experiment 601), a strong, purple and four-armed experiment.
  - Skip (Experiment 089), a purple experiment with an hourglass body who can "skip" those who use him ten years into the future.
  - Holio (Experiment 606), a red-furred, chipmunk-like experiment who can produce black holes.
  - Finder (Experiment 158), a red, shrew-like experiment who can find anything on request.
  - Deforestator (Experiment 515), a purple experiment who has long and sharp spinning claws.
  - Yin (Experiment 501), a teal cephalopod experiment who can spray water at high pressure.
  - Yang (Experiment 502), an orange, lizard-like experiment who can shoot lava.
  - Tank (Experiment 586), an orange, bulldog and armadillo-like experiment who grows bigger upon eating metal.
  - Checkers (Experiment 029), a yellow and centipede-like experiment who gives those who wear him the ability to control others.
  - Slugger (Experiment 608), a yellow and Pteranodon-like experiment who can deflect projectiles with his baseball bat-like tail.
  - Splodyhead (Experiment 619), a red-furred and six-limbed experiment who can fire hot plasma balls from his lone nostril.
- Tress MacNeille as:
  - Bonnie (Experiment 149), a green and koala-like experiment who is designed to steal things and is Clyde's partner.
  - Gigi (Experiment 007), a Shih Tzu-like experiment who is Mertle's pet "dog". The film reveals that she is capable of speech.
  - Houdini (Experiment 604), a cream-colored, timid and rabbit-like experiment who can turn anything invisible, including himself.
  - Topper (Experiment 025), a yellow and star-shaped experiment who can glow brightly.
  - Melty (Experiment 228), a small, red and dragon-like experiment who can breath a blue fire that melts objects.
  - Amnesio (Experiment 303), a teal, insect-like and amnesia-inducing experiment.
  - Cannonball (Experiment 520), a pinkish and rotund experiment who can creating large waves when jumping into water.
  - Richter (Experiment 513), a purple Ankylosaur-like experiment who can produce earthquakes with a slap of his tail.
  - The G.A.C.C. vehicle's navigational computer
- Nancy Cartwright (uncredited) as:
  - Shortstuff (Experiment 297), an orange and crab-like experiment who was originally small but had his size enhanced in his debut episode of The Series.
  - Phantasmo (Experiment 375), a green and ghost-like experiment who can possess inanimate objects.
- Bobcat Goldthwait as Nosy (Experiment 199): A red experiment with a big nose who is designed to uncover secrets but usually exposes gossip.
- Rocky McMurray as Clyde (Experiment 150): A brownish and bear-like experiment with a cybernetic left arm who is designed to steal things and is Bonnie's partner.
- Lili Ishida as Yuki: One of Lilo's hula classmates and Mertle's friends.
- Jillian Henry as Elena: Another one of Lilo's hula classmates and Mertle's friends.
- Kali Whitehurst as Teresa: Another one of Lilo's hula classmates and Mertle's friends.
- Debra Rogers as First Officer Ombit: A grey-colored alien with an armadillo-like appearance who is an officer of the Galactic Armada and becomes part of Stitch's crew on the BRB-9000.
- Doug Stone as Navigator Ensign Gecto: A green alien who is an officer of the Galactic Armada.

David Kawena also makes a cameo appearance at the end of the film, appearing for the family photo.

== Production ==
According to writer-producer Jess Winfield, Leroy & Stitch was produced alongside the second season of Lilo & Stitch: The Series and finished production in 2005. The film was originally set for a direct-to-video release in spring 2006. The animation production was outsourced to Wang Film Productions, a Taiwanese studio that previously worked on The Series.

The film marks the third film in the Lilo & Stitch franchise without any involvement from creators Chris Sanders and Dean DeBlois (besides Sanders providing the voices of Stitch, Leroy, and the latter's clones), as they would leave Disney for DreamWorks Animation to write and direct How to Train Your Dragon.

== Release ==
Leroy & Stitch debuted on Disney Channel on June 23, 2006, and also aired on Toon Disney on June 26, 2006. It was released on DVD in the United States on June 27, 2006, under Walt Disney Pictures. Bonus features of the DVD include a then-unaired episode of Lilo & Stitch: The Series titled "Link" and a set-top game The Big Red Battleship Flight Simulator. Distributed by Buena Vista Home Entertainment, DVD sales in the United States earned a total of $16,672,732 as of September 2021.

=== Critical reception ===
Leroy & Stitch received mixed reviews. On the review aggregator website Rotten Tomatoes, 43% of 7 critics' reviews are positive, with an average rating of 4.8/10.

Skyler Miller of AllMovie gave the film a rating of three and a half out of five stars, (Note: After AllMovie removed professional reviews from the site in 2024, AllMovie's rating for the film was changed to 2 out of 5 stars; it has since been changed again to 2½ out of 5 stars as of March 2025.) praising the voice acting, Elvis Presley songs, and "[the] fast-moving plot that mixes frenetic action, sentimentality, and a few laughs." Miller wrote, "While [Leroy & Stitch is] not nearly as engaging or emotionally rich as the original [Lilo & Stitch] film that inspired it [...] all in all, Leroy & Stitch is a fitting wrap-up to an enjoyable animated series".

Edward Perkis of CinemaBlend gave the film a rating of one out of five stars, stating it is "just another direct-to-video sequel of Disney with no unusual stuff in it", and further uplifted and preferred the original film.

Common Sense Media (CSM) gave the film's quality four out of five stars, applicable for ages five and above, based on ten reviews from both parents and children.

The film was nominated for the 2007 Golden Reel Award by the Motion Picture Sound Editors, which ultimately went to Disneytoon's direct-to-video film The Fox and the Hound 2.

In 2019, Petrana Radulovic of Polygon ranked Leroy & Stitch 9th out of 26 films on her list of direct-to-video sequels, prequels, and "mid-quels" to Disney animated films, one rank higher than Stitch! The Movie. Despite criticizing Leroy & Stitch for focusing more on the aliens and space over the "charming" characters like with Stitch! The Movie, she ranked the finale film higher than the pilot film because of all the now-united 626 experiments' "wacky and really specific powers", stating that "[w]e get to see what they've all been up to after acclimating to life on Hawaii[...], and see them in action in the final battle." In a similar list in 2020, Lisa Wehrstedt of Insider ranked Leroy & Stitch 7th out of 25 films on her list. Werhstedt wrote, "For fans who were really involved with the series [...], this film acts like the perfect finale." However, she also criticized it for "los[ing] a bit of the human charm of the original and the previous [released] sequel".

== Soundtrack ==
Lilo & Stitch Hawaiian Album

Soundtrack album by Various artists
- Released: 2006
- Recorded: 2005–2006
- Genres: Rock, country rock, pop
- Label: Walt Disney

Lilo & Stitch music chronology
Lilo & Stitch 2: Island Favorites (2006)	Lilo & Stitch Hawaiian Album (2006)	Stitch!: Original Soundtrack (2010)

Lilo & Stitch Hawaiian Album is the soundtrack to Disney's Leroy & Stitch. The majority of the Leroy & Stitch soundtrack are Elvis Presley records, while other parts of the soundtrack include music inspired by Gustav Holst's "The Planets". The soundtrack also contains score pieces from the original Lilo & Stitch film (which was composed by Alan Silvestri) and from Lilo & Stitch: The Series's pilot film Stitch! The Movie (which was composed by Michael Tavera, who was also the composer for The Series).

=== Track listing ===
No.	Title	Writer(s)	Performer(s)	Length
1.	"Aloha ʻOe"	Queen Liliuokalani	Elvis Presley
2.	"I'm So Lonesome I Could Cry"	Hank Williams	Presley
3.	"Hawaii Five-O Theme"	Morton Stevens
4.	"Jailhouse Rock"	Jerry Leiber and Mike Stoller	Presley
5.	"Don't Be Cruel (Everlife version)"	Otis Blackwell, Elvis Presley	Everlife
6.	"Aloha, E Komo Mai"	Danny Jacob and Ali Olmo	Jump5
7.	"Aloha ʻOe"	Queen Liliuokalani	Lilo, Stitch, and Reuben (Daveigh Chase, Chris Sanders, and Rob Paulsen)
8.	"Shouldn't Have Yelled (Lilo & Stitch)"	Alan Silvestri
9.	"What's Best for Lilo (Lilo & Stitch)"	Silvestri
10.	"Ugly (Lilo & Stitch)"	Silvestri
11.	"Rescue (Lilo & Stitch)"	Silvestri
12.	"The Big Battle (Stitch! The Movie)"	Michael Tavera

== See also ==
- Lilo & Stitch: The Series, an animated television spin-off of the animated feature film Lilo & Stitch that preceded this film
  - List of Lilo & Stitch: The Series episodes
- Stitch!, an anime spin-off of Lilo & Stitch that succeeded this film
