= Lilo & Stitch: The Series =

American animated television series

- Also known as: Disney's Lilo & Stitch
- Genre: Science fiction; Fantasy; Action-adventure; Comedy
- Based on: Lilo & Stitch by: Chris Sanders and; Dean DeBlois
- Developed by: Bobs Gannaway; Jess Winfield
- Voices of: Chris Sanders; Daveigh Chase; David Ogden Stiers; Kevin McDonald; Tia Carrere; Jeff Bennett; Kevin Michael Richardson; Rob Paulsen; Liliana Mumy; Dee Bradley Baker
- Opening theme: "Aloha, E Komo Mai", Music by Danny Jacob and Mark Hammond; lyrics by Danny Jacob and Ali B Olmo; performed by Jump5
- Ending theme: "Aloha, E Komo Mai" (instrumental)
- Composer: Michael Tavera
- Country of origin: United States
- No. of seasons: 2
- No. of episodes: 65 (67 segments), (Note: Most episodes (63) are 22-minute full-length segments; season two's "Mrs. Hasagawa's Cats / Ace" and "Glitch / Woops" are each split into two 11-minute half-length segments.) plus pilot and finale films (list of episodes)

Production
- Executive producers: Jess Winfield; Tony Craig; Bobs Gannaway
- Producer: Victor Cook (season 2)
- Running time: 22 minutes
- Production company: Walt Disney Television Animation

Original release
- Network: Toon Disney; Disney Channel; ABC (ABC Kids)
- Release: September 20, 2003 – July 29, 2006

Related
- Lilo & Stitch (2002); Stitch! The Movie (2003); Lilo & Stitch 2: Stitch Has a Glitch (2005); Leroy & Stitch (2006); Stitch! (2008–2015); Stitch & Ai (2017)

Lilo & Stitch: The Series (titled simply as Disney's Lilo & Stitch on its title card and on American copyright registrations) is an American animated television series produced by Walt Disney Television Animation. It premiered on ABC on September 20, 2003, as part of ABC Kids, with a delayed premiere on Disney Channel on October 12, 2003. The series ended on July 29, 2006, after airing 65 episodes in two seasons.

A sequel spin-off of the 2002 feature film on which it was based, and the follow-up to the direct-to-video pilot film Stitch! The Movie, it was the first of three television series produced in the Lilo & Stitch franchise, and the only one to retain the same setting as the original film. It aired on Disney Channel worldwide but has only been released on DVD in full in Japan, in four box sets. A follow-up film, Leroy & Stitch, was released in 2006 and served as a finale to both the television series and the original Lilo & Stitch canon. (Note: Three succeeding works in the franchise—Japanese anime series Stitch!, Chinese animated series Stitch & Ai, and Japanese manga Stitch & the Samurai—replace Lilo with different humans who become Stitch's new best friend and change the setting to other regions on Earth.)

== Plot ==
Continuing where Stitch! The Movie left off, Lilo and Stitch are given the task of collecting the rest of Jumba's 623 missing experiments, changing them from bad to good, and finding the one place where they truly belong. Meanwhile, the former Captain Gantu and his reluctant partner, Experiment 625 (later named Reuben), try to capture the experiments for the imprisoned Dr. Hämsterviel.

Running for two seasons, it had a total of 65 episodes. The storyline of the series concluded with the Disney Channel broadcast of the television film Leroy & Stitch on June 23, 2006.

== Episodes ==
Season	Episodes	Originally released		
Season	Episodes	First released	Last released	Network
Pilot film		August 26, 2003		Direct-to-video
1	39	September 20, 2003	February 28, 2004	Toon Disney; Disney Channel; ABC (ABC Kids)
2	26 (Note: 28 segments; episodes 23 and 24 ("Mrs. Hasagawa's Cats / Ace" and "Glitch / Woops") each contain two 11-minute segments)	November 5, 2004	July 29, 2006	Toon Disney; Disney Channel; ABC (ABC Kids)
Finale film		June 23, 2006		Disney Channel

=== Crossover episodes ===
During its second season, Lilo & Stitch: The Series had crossovers with four other shows from Walt Disney Television Animation, three of which were airing during its run and one of which had already ended before the show's production began. According to executive producer Jess Winfield, these episodes were inspired by the four "Inter-Stitch-al" teaser trailers that were made for the original Lilo & Stitch film, which featured Stitch invading scenes of various Disney Renaissance (The Little Mermaid, Beauty and the Beast, Aladdin, and The Lion King) films and ruining them.

- "Morpholomew" (season 2, episode 13) features characters from American Dragon: Jake Long.
- "Spats" (season 2, episode 14) features characters from The Proud Family.
- "Rufus" (season 2, episode 19) features characters from Kim Possible.
- "Lax" (season 2, episode 21) features characters from Recess.

== Characters ==
=== Main ===
- Stitch (voiced by Chris Sanders), also known as Experiment 626, (Note: Most experiment numbers are pronounced by digit (e.g. Stitch is "Experiment Six-Two-Six"), with the only known exceptions being Spooky (Experiment 300) and Woops (Experiment 600), whose numbers are pronounced as whole numbers (i.e. "Experiment Three Hundred" and "Experiment Six Hundred"), and Splodyhead (Experiment 619), whose number was pronounced "Six Nineteen" by Jumba. Separately, "X-" is the official abbreviation for "Experiment" when referring to a specific one of such (e.g. "X-626" for Stitch).) is one of the two lead characters. After finding out about his 625 other experiment "cousins", he and Lilo set out to find them, reform them to good, and have them join their ever-expanding ʻohana. He also learns more about life on Earth along the way.
- Lilo Pelekai (voiced by Daveigh Chase) is the other lead character. She is Stitch's owner and best friend. She assists Stitch in finding his "cousins", naming them, and finding them a "one true place" where they can use their abilities for good.
- Dr. Jumba Jookiba (voiced by David Ogden Stiers) is the creator of the many genetic experiments, which include Stitch and Reuben. He lives with the Pelekai ʻohana after being exiled to Earth in the original film alongside Pleakley. He plays the role of Lilo and Nani's "uncle" in the ʻohana and wears a human disguise in public. He frequently assists Lilo and Stitch in capturing the experiments, usually by providing them with expositions on his experiments and various tools he creates.
- Pleakley (voiced by Kevin McDonald) is a former agent for the United Galactic Federation. He lives with the Pelekai ʻohana after being exiled to Earth in the original film alongside Jumba. He plays the role of Lilo and Nani's "aunt" in the ʻohana and frequently cross-dresses in the role. He also assists Lilo and Stitch in capturing the experiments but to a lesser extent. He normally helps Nani out in maintaining the household. Being a self-proclaimed "Earth expert", he always tries to experience what Earth has to offer based on his obscure, mass media-based research. In the episode "Fibber", it was revealed that his first name is Wendy.
- Gantu (voiced by Kevin Michael Richardson) is Hämsterviel's henchman who was forcibly retired from his position by the Grand Councilwoman as captain of the Galactic Armada at the end of the original film. He fights against Lilo and Stitch in capturing the experiments but is frequently defeated due to his arrogance, clumsiness, and Stitch's superior abilities.
- Nani Pelekai (voiced by Tia Carrere) is Lilo's older sister and legal guardian, and caretaker of the household that they live in. She is always busy and burned out, and constantly has to deal with Lilo and Stitch's shenanigans. She works in a surfboard and beach equipment rental hut on Lahui Beach in early season one but switches her employment to the rental wing of the Birds of Paradise Hotel midway through the season.
- X-625 (voiced by Rob Paulsen) is Gantu's sidekick in capturing experiments. He is a genetic experiment who has all the abilities of Stitch but is a fluent speaker of the English language. However, he is a lazy coward who prefers to make sandwiches rather than fight. He is referred to by his experiment number throughout The Series; he was not given a name until Leroy & Stitch, where Lilo baptizes him as "Reuben", although Lilo calls him "Sandwich Boy" once in the episode "627".
- Dr. Jacques von Hämsterviel (voiced by Jeff Bennett) is Jumba's former lab partner who seeks to capture the genetic experiments he helped to create through financing, hiring Gantu for help. He works from his "prison cell" which he set up as a laboratory. His name is usually mispronounced much to his chagrin, usually as "Hamsterwheel" or "Hamsterveal".

=== Recurring ===
- Mertle Edmonds (voiced by Liliana Mumy) is Lilo's classmate and rival. She appears in many episodes of the series, usually causing conflicts for the title duo.
- David Kawena (voiced by Dee Bradley Baker) is Nani's boyfriend who is a local surfer and fire performer, and is aware of the existence of aliens. He appears in "Richter", "Cannonball", "Yin-Yang", "Splodyhead", "Fibber", "Amnesio", "Poxy", "Hunkahunka", and "Wishy-Washy". He is mentioned in "Mr. Stenchy", "Finder" and "Angel".
- X-624/Angel (voiced by Tara Strong) is Stitch's main girlfriend/love interest. Angel is a pink female experiment who was designed to turn the good experiments evil with a siren song. She was caught by Gantu at the end of her episode and was later rescued in "Snafu". She only appeared in those two episodes along with a cameo in "Remmy".
- X-007/Gigi (voiced by Tress MacNeille) is Mertle's pet. Gigi is a Shih-Tzu like experiment and her "one true place" is with Mertle as her pet. She first appeared in "Yapper" (which focused on her and is named after the nickname Lilo gave her) and later appeared in "Amnesio" and "PJ".
- X-221/Sparky (voiced by Frank Welker) is the first of Stitch's cousins that Stitch met. Sparky is a yellow experiment designed to create electric energy. His place where he truly belongs is in the old lighthouse to utilize his electric skills to generate light. He appeared in "Elastico", "The Asteroid", "Angel", "Skip", "Checkers", "Ploot", "Remmy", and "Snafu".
- Cobra Bubbles (voiced by Kevin Michael Richardson) is a mysterious government agent who is working as a social worker and the only known human aside from Lilo's family who is aware of the aliens and experiments. He appeared in "Amnesio", "The Asteroid", and "Shush", while the title experiment of the episode "Spooky" (Experiment 300) changed into Bubbles to trick and frighten Nani (Ving Rhames, who played Cobra in the original film and Stitch! The Movie, was also credited in this episode alongside Richardson).
- Elena (voiced by Jillian Henry), Teresa (voiced by Kali Whitehurst), and Yuki (voiced by Lili Ishida) are classmates of Mertle and Lilo who form a posse with the former. They usually travel in a group and seldom say anything other than a sarcastic "Yeah!" in unison when agreeing with Mertle on something. They appeared in several episodes of The Series.
- Mr. Wong (voiced by Clyde Kusatsu) is the owner of the rental hut on Lahui Beach and Nani's employer in early season one. He appears in "Richter" and "Holio", and is mentioned in "Cannonball".
- Mrs. Edmonds (voiced by April Winchell) is Mertle's mother, who is kinder than her daughter. She appeared in "Clip", "Holio", "Houdini", "Finder", "Babyfier", "Bonnie & Clyde", "Spike", "Belle", and "Shush".
- Grand Councilwoman (voiced by Zoe Caldwell) is the leader of the United Galactic Federation, she is the one who banished Stitch in the first film. She later agrees to let Lilo and Stitch become official experiment hunters in order to retrieve all of the remaining experiments. She only appeared in "Finder".
- Keoni Jameson (voiced by Shaun Fleming) is a young, laid-back boy on whom Lilo has a crush. Lilo constantly tries to vie for his affections. He had a crush on Pleakley, whom he knows as Lilo's 'aunt', in the episode "Hunkahunka", but in "Nosy" he stated that he only had the crush for that one week. His father owns several businesses on Kauai. He has a friend who just happens to be a girl (not a girlfriend, though). He also appeared in "Kixx", "Amnesio", "Swirly", "Melty", "Sinker", and "Morpholomew".
- Mr. Jameson (voiced by Bryan Cranston) is the father of Keoni and Nani's employer from "Melty" and "Nosy" onward. He owns several businesses around Kauai, including the Birds of Paradise Hotel. He appeared in "Cannonball", "Melty", "Nosy", "Babyfier", "Checkers", and "Link".
- Moses Puloki (voiced by Kunewa Mook) is the hula teacher of Lilo's hālau hula, where he teaches Lilo, Victoria, Mertle, Yuki, Elena, and Teresa how to hula. He is very patient with his students and tolerates their antics. Lilo and her friends often call Moses, "Kumu", Hawaiian for teacher. He appeared in several episodes of The Series.
- Officer Kahiko (voiced by Kevin Michael Richardson) is a police officer who knows Lilo well and occasionally tries to keep her out of trouble when she isn't accompanied by Nani. He appeared in the episodes "Holio", "Bonnie & Clyde", "Snooty", and "Shush".
- Victoria (voiced by Alyson Stoner) is Lilo's new (human) best friend in the second season, whom she meets in the episode "Swapper". Throughout the episode, Lilo tries to prove to her she wasn't weird. However, Victoria reveals she likes weird stuff so she and Lilo become best friends. Victoria is also in Lilo's hula class and owns Snooty (Experiment 277) as a pet. She appeared in "Swapper", "Snooty", "Slick", "Remmy", and "Wishy-Washy".
- Mrs. Lynne Hasagawa (voiced by Amy Hill) is a little old lady who owns Kokaua Town's fruit stand. As seen in the first segment of "Mrs. Hasagawa's Cats/Ace", several experiments live with her. She appeared in several episodes of The Series.
- Ice Cream Man (voiced briefly by Frank Welker) – This unnamed character is a running gag throughout the Lilo & Stitch franchise. Whenever he appears, he drops his ice cream (usually a mint-flavored ice cream, presumably from its color) from its cone before he can finish it. This character has no speaking parts in The Series except saying "Whoa!" when he tripped over a pod. He also cries after suffering from X-151 (Babyfier)'s effects. His real eyes can be seen in the episode "Swirly".

== Production ==
In July 2002, Thomas Schumacher, then-president of Walt Disney Feature Animation, announced that Disney was developing a television series sequel to the film for Disney Channel in fall 2003 under the working title of Stitch! The TV Series. The series was announced alongside the direct-to-video film, Stitch! The Movie. Television animation directors Tony Craig and Bobs Gannaway, who both worked on Disney animated series such as House of Mouse and The Lion King's Timon & Pumbaa, and television screenwriter Jess Winfield, who wrote for Teacher's Pet and Buzz Lightyear of Star Command, served as executive producers of the show. Victor Cook and Don MacKinnon directed for the show's first 39 episodes, which comprised the first season. For the remaining 26 episodes, which comprised the second season, Rob LaDuca replaced MacKinnon as the other main director alongside Cook, while Craig directed two episodes, "Spike" and "Shoe". A majority of the voice cast from the original film reprised their roles in the series.

During a Goof Troop panel with Jim Cummings and April Winchell at a fan convention in Las Vegas in 2021, voice actor Rob Paulsen claimed that he was initially supposed to be replaced by a celebrity voice actor as the voice of Experiment 625 after the first thirteen episodes. However, the production team later decided to keep Paulsen as the character's voice throughout The Series's run.

== Release ==
=== Broadcast ===
The series aired as part of the ABC Kids block on ABC from September 20, 2003, to September 2, 2006, Disney Channel from October 12, 2003, to 2010, again as part of the Disney Replay block from August 20, 2014, to January 1, 2015, during Stitch Day on June 26, 2025, (which was being aired to commemorate the success of the live action film), and Toon Disney from January 16, 2006 to February 8, 2009, days before the network rebranded to Disney XD, which eventually reran the series from March 11 to July 29, 2018, and again on June 26, 2025. The show also aired as a launch program on the Disney Junior channel from March 23, 2012, to September 3, 2013, marking this the first Disney Channel original series to air on that network.

=== Home media ===
Only a few episodes of Lilo & Stitch: The Series were released on home media in the United States. The episodes "Clip" and "Mr. Stenchy" were bonus features for a DVD board game called Lilo & Stitch's Island of Adventures that was released on November 11, 2003. Another two episodes, "Slushy" and "Poxy", were released on separate Game Boy Advance Video compilations of Disney Channel series. Finally, the final episode "Link" was a bonus feature on the Leroy & Stitch DVD that was released on June 27, 2006, a month before the episode aired on television.

=== Streaming ===
Lilo & Stitch: The Series was available on the now-defunct DisneyLife streaming service in the United Kingdom.

The first American digital streaming release for The Series was via the TV Everywhere service DisneyNow in 2018, while the show reran on Disney XD, although it was later removed from the service in August that year. It was later made digitally available in the United States again and in other countries on Disney+ when that service launched on November 12, 2019, alongside all four feature-length animated Lilo & Stitch films.

== Reception ==
In a since-deleted review for the finale film Leroy & Stitch, AllMovie's Skyler Miller called Lilo & Stitch: The Series a "high quality" television series, stating that it "was a pleasant surprise to fans of the 2002 film, continuing its good-natured, offbeat spirit while introducing the ingenious plot device of having the titular duo capture and rehabilitate Stitch's 625 'cousins.'"

Betsy Wallace of Common Sense Media gave the show's quality 3 out of 5 stars, applicable for ages 6 and above. Wallace noted that "Lilo frequently demonstrates compassion to creatures" but ultimately deemed the series' humor to be its "strong point", pointing out that the show "even makes fun of [its own] scant educational content".

In his 2018 book The Encyclopedia of American Animated Television Shows, author David Perlmutter wrote that the show's concept was "saddled [...] with formulaic and derivative elements" that were not found in the original film, though he praised Kevin McDonald's vocal performance as Pleakley, calling said performance "clever and amusing" and "the show's central [sic] grace".

=== Awards and nominations ===
Year	Nominee / work	Award	Result
2004	Jason Oliver & Steve Dierkens for episode "Sprout"	Motion Picture Sound Editors Award for Best Sound Editing in Television Animation: Music	Nominated
2005	Michael Tavera	Daytime Emmy Award for Outstanding Music Direction and Composition	Nominated

== See also ==
- Stitch!, an anime series that serves as the second television series in the Lilo & Stitch franchise, taking place years after Lilo & Stitch: The Series
- Stitch & Ai, a Chinese animated series that serves as the third television series in the franchise, which was partially worked on by some of the same production crew as Lilo & Stitch: The Series
