= Hitomi Hase =

Japanese voice actress

Hitomi Hase 長谷 瞳
- Born: May 10, 1979 (age 47); Hokkaido, Japan
- Occupation: Voice actress

Hitomi Hase (長谷 瞳, Hase Hitomi; born May 10, 1979 in Hokkaido) is a Japanese voice actress affiliated with Mausu Promotion.

== Filmography ==
=== Anime television series ===
- Tales of Agriculture - Mother
- Stitch! - Taka, Boogoo

=== Games ===
- Metal Gear Solid 4: Guns of the Patriots - MGO Soldiers

== Dubbing Roles ==
=== Live Action Films ===
- The Suite Life Movie - Cody Martin (Cole Sprouse)

==== Live Action Television ====
- Cold Case - Young Ariel Shuman (Daveigh Chase)
- The Suite Life of Zack & Cody - Cody Martin (Cole Sprouse)
- The Suite Life on Deck - Cody Martin (Cole Sprouse)

==== Theatrical Animation ====
- Arthur and the Invisibles - Additional Voice
- Kung Fu Panda - Mother of Rabbits
