= Underground hard-rock mining =

Mining techniques used to excavate hard minerals and gems

A 3D diagram of a modern underground mine with shaft access

Underground hard-rock mining refers to various underground mining techniques used to excavate "hard" minerals, usually those containing metals, such as ore containing gold, silver, iron, copper, zinc, nickel, tin, and lead. It also involves the same techniques used to excavate ores of gems, such as diamonds and rubies. Soft-rock mining refers to the excavation of softer minerals, such as salt, coal, and oil sands.

== Mine access ==
=== Underground access ===
Accessing underground ore can be achieved via a decline (ramp), inclined vertical shaft or adit.

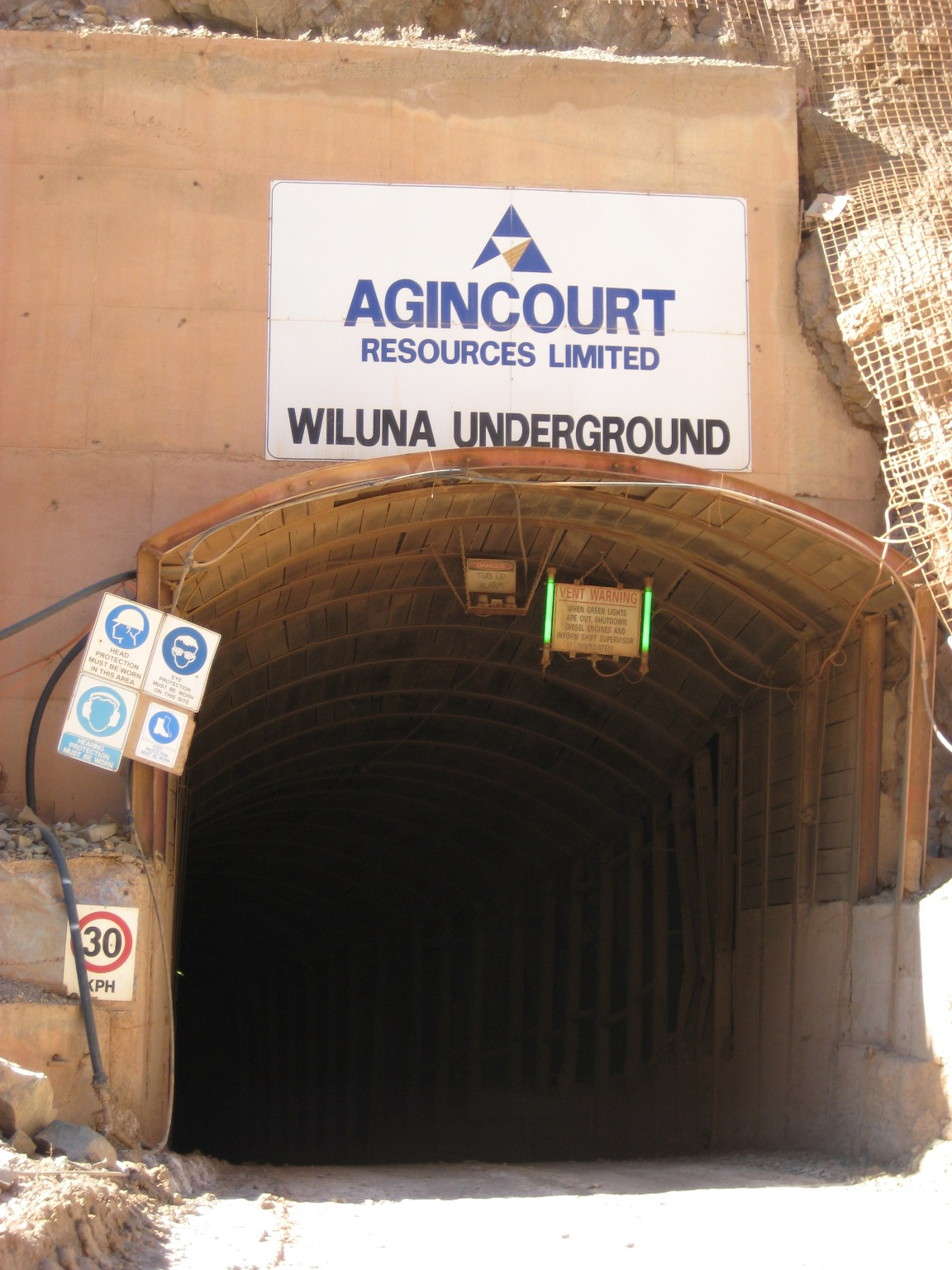
Decline portal

- Declines can be a spiral tunnel which circles either the flank of the deposit or circles around the deposit. The decline begins with a box cut, which is the portal to the surface. Depending on the amount of overburden and quality of bedrock, a galvanized steel culvert may be required for safety purposes. They may also be started into the wall of an open cut mine.
- Shafts are vertical excavations sunk adjacent to an ore body. Shafts are sunk for ore bodies where haulage to surface via truck is not economical. Shaft haulage is more economical than truck haulage at depth, and a mine may have both a decline and a ramp.
- Adits are horizontal excavations into the side of a hill or mountain. Adits are used for horizontal or near-horizontal ore bodies where there is no need for a ramp or shaft.

Declines are often started from the side of the high wall of an open cut mine when the ore body is of a payable grade sufficient to support an underground mining operation, but the strip ratio has become too great to support open cast extraction methods. They are also often built and maintained as an emergency safety access from the underground workings and a means of moving large equipment to the workings.

=== Ore access ===
Levels are excavated horizontally off the decline or shaft to access the ore body. Stopes are then excavated perpendicular (or near perpendicular) to the level into the ore.

== Development mining vs. production mining ==
There are two principal phases of underground mining: development mining and production mining.

Development mining is composed of excavation almost entirely in (non-valuable) waste rock in order to gain access to the orebody. There are six steps in development mining: remove previously blasted material (muck out round), scaling (removing any unstable slabs of rock hanging from the roof and sidewalls to protect workers and equipment from damage), installing support or/and reinforcement using shotcrete or other supports, drill face rock, load explosives, and blast explosives. To start the mining, the first step is to make the path to go down. The path is defined as 'Decline' as describe above. Before the start of a decline, all pre-planning of the power facility, drilling arrangement, de-watering, ventilation and, muck withdrawal facilities are required.

Production mining is further broken down into two methods, long hole and short hole. Short hole mining is similar to development mining, except that it occurs in ore. There are several methods of long hole mining. Typically, long hole mining requires two excavations within the ore at different elevations below surface (15 to 30 metres or 50 to 100 feet). Holes are drilled between the two excavations and loaded with explosives. The holes are blasted, and the ore is removed from the bottom excavation.

== Ventilation ==
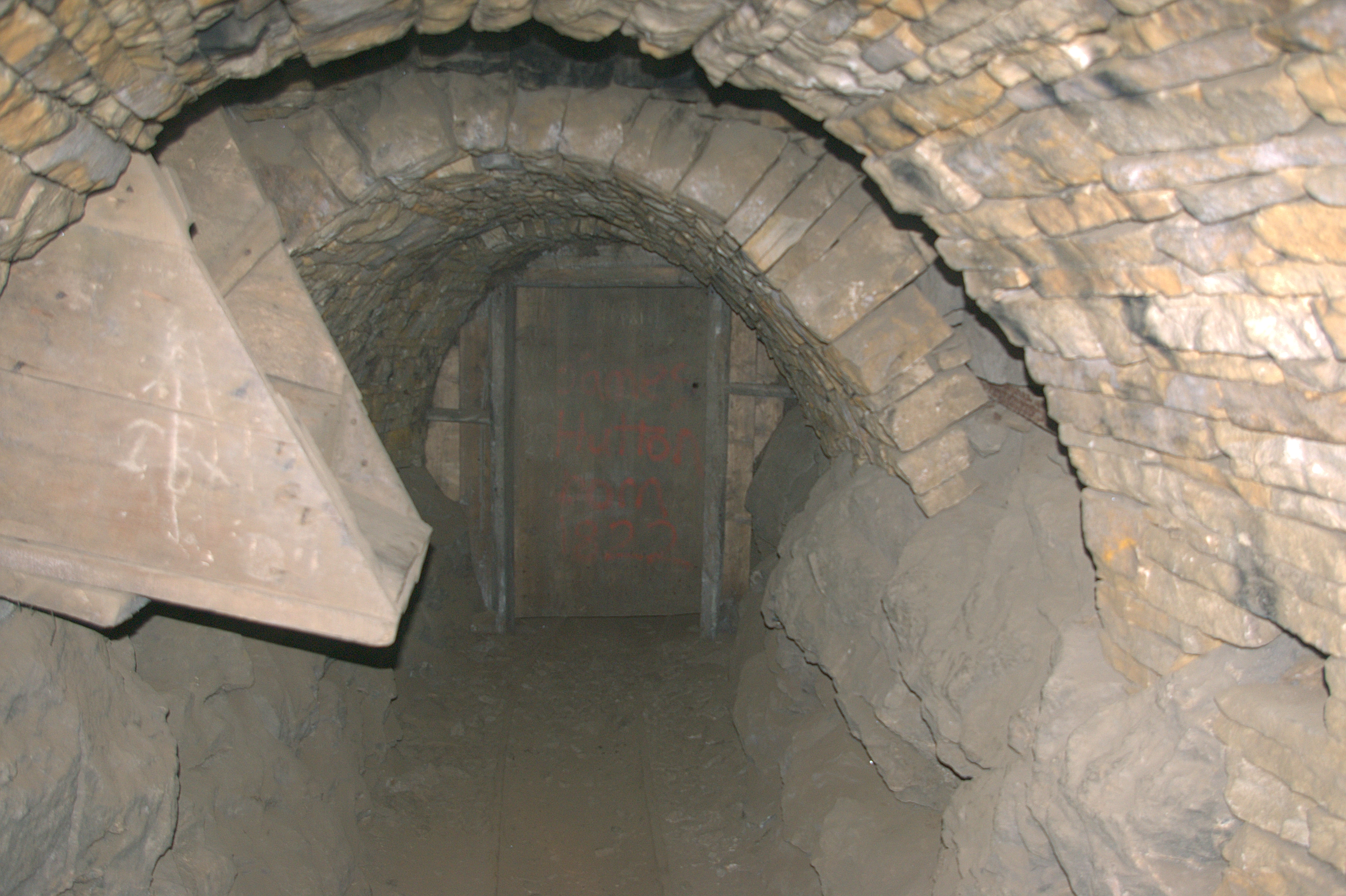
Door for directing ventilation in an old lead mine. The ore hopper at the front is not part of the ventilation.

One of the most important aspects of underground hard rock mining is ventilation. Ventilation is the primary method of clearing hazardous gases and/or dust which are created from drilling and blasting activity (e.g., silica dust, NOx), diesel equipment (e.g., diesel particulate, carbon monoxide), or to protect against gases that are naturally emanating from the rock (e.g., radon gas). Ventilation is also used to manage underground temperatures for the workers. In deep, hot mines ventilation is used to cool the workplace; however, in very cold locations the air is heated to just above freezing before it enters the mine. Ventilation raises are typically used to transfer ventilation from surface to the workplaces, and can be modified for use as emergency escape routes. The primary sources of heat in underground hard rock mines are virgin rock temperature, machinery, auto compression, and fissure water. Other small contributing factors are human body heat and blasting.

== Ground support ==
Some means of support is required in order to maintain the stability of the openings that are excavated. This support comes in two forms; local support and area support.

=== Area ground support ===
Area ground support is used to prevent major ground failure. Holes are drilled into the back (ceiling) and walls and a long steel rod (or rock bolt) is installed to hold the ground together. There are three categories of rock bolt, differentiated by how they engage the host rock. They are:

==== Mechanical bolts ====
- Point anchor bolts (or expansion shell bolts) are a common style of area ground support. A point anchor bolt is a metal bar between 20 mm – 25 mm in diameter, and between 1 m – 4 m long (the size is determined by the mine's engineering department). There is an expansion shell at the end of the bolt which is inserted into the hole. As the bolt is tightened by the installation drill the expansion shell expands and the bolt tightens holding the rock together. Mechanical bolts are considered temporary support as their lifespan is reduced by corrosion as they are not grouted.

==== Grouted bolts ====
- Resin grouted rebar is used in areas which require more support than a point anchor bolt can give. The rebar used is of similar size as a point anchor bolt but does not have an expansion shell. Once the hole for the rebar is drilled, cartridges of polyester resin are installed in the hole. The rebar bolt is installed after the resin and spun by the installation drill. This opens the resin cartridge and mixes it. Once the resin hardens, the drill spinning tightens the rebar bolt holding the rock together. Resin grouted rebar is considered a permanent ground support with a lifespan of 20–30 years.
- Cable bolts are used to bind large masses of rock in the hanging wall and around large excavations. Cable bolts are much larger than standard rock bolts and rebar, usually between 6 and 25 metres long. Cable bolts are grouted with a cement grout.

==== Friction bolts ====
- Friction stabilizer (frequently called by the genericized trademark Split Set) are much easier to install than mechanical bolts or grouted bolts. The bolt is hammered into the drill hole, which has a smaller diameter than the bolt. Pressure from the bolt on the wall holds the rock together. Friction stabilizers are particularly susceptible to corrosion and rust from water unless they are grouted. Once grouted the friction increases by a factor of 3–4.
- Swellex is similar to Friction stabilizers, except the bolt diameter is smaller than the hole diameter. High pressure water is injected into the bolt to expand the bolt diameter to hold the rock together. Like the friction stabilizer, swellex is poorly protected from corrosion and rust.

=== Local ground support ===
Local ground support is used to prevent smaller rocks from falling from the back and ribs. Not all excavations require local ground support.

- Welded Wire Mesh is a metal screen with 10 cm x 10 cm (4 inch) openings. The mesh is held to the backs and walls using friction stabiliser bolts, point anchor bolts, or resin grouted rebar.
- Shotcrete is fibre-reinforced spray-on concrete which coats the back and ribs preventing smaller rocks from falling. Shotcrete thickness can be between 50 mm – 100 mm.
- Latex Membranes can be sprayed on the backs and ribs similar to shotcrete, but in smaller amounts.

== Stope and retreat vs. stope and fill ==
=== Stope and retreat ===
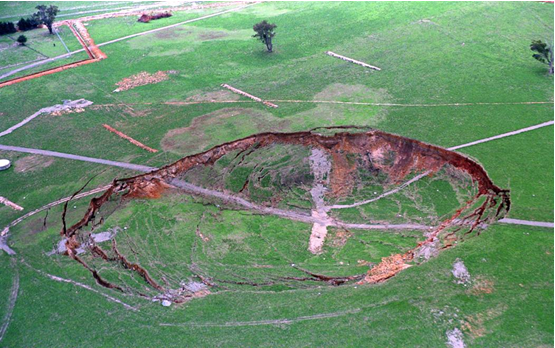
Sub-Level Caving Subsidence reaches surface at the Ridgeway underground mine.

Using this method, mining is planned to extract rock from the stopes without filling the voids; this allows the wall rocks to cave in to the extracted stope after all the ore has been removed. The stope is then sealed to prevent access.

=== Stope and fill ===
Where large bulk ore bodies are to be mined at great depth, or where leaving pillars of ore is uneconomical, the open stope is filled with backfill, which can be a cement and rock mixture, a cement and sand mixture or a cement and tailings mixture. This method is popular as the refilled stopes provide support for the adjacent stopes, allowing total extraction of economic resources.

== Methods ==
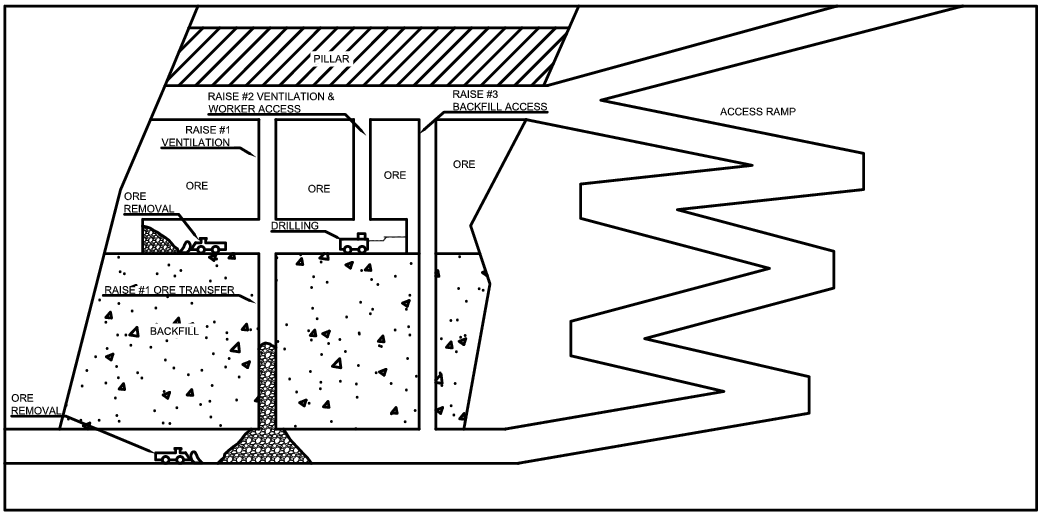
Schematic diagram of cut and fill mining

The mining method selected is determined by the size, shape, orientation and type of orebody to be mined. The orebody can be narrow vein such as a gold mine in the Witwatersrand, the orebody can be massive similar to the Olympic Dam mine, South Australia, or Cadia-Ridgeway Mine, New South Wales. The width or size of the orebody is determined by the grade as well as the distribution of the ore. The dip of the orebody also has an influence on the mining method for example a narrow horizontal vein orebody will be mined by room and pillar or a longwall method whereas a vertical narrow vein orebody will be mined by an open stoping or cut and fill method. Further consideration is needed for the strength of the ore as well as the surrounding rock. An orebody hosted in strong self-supporting rock may be mined by an open stoping method and an orebody hosted in poor rock may need to be mined by a cut and fill method where the void is continuously filled as the ore is removed.

=== Selective mining methods ===
- Cut and fill mining is a method of short-hole mining used in steeply dipping or irregular ore zones, in particular where the hanging wall limits the use of long-hole methods. The ore is mined in horizontal or slightly inclined slices, and then filled with waste rock, sand or tailings. Either fill option may be cemented with binders to add cohesion to the matrix or left uncemented. Cut and fill mining is an expensive but selective method, with the advantages of low ore loss and dilution.
- Drift and fill is similar to cut and fill, except that it is used in ore zones, which are wider than the method of drifting will allow to be mined. In this case, the first drift is developed in the ore, and is backfilled using consolidated fill. The second drift is driven adjacent to the first drift. This carries on until the ore zone is mined out to its full width, at which time the second cut is started atop of the first cut.
- Shrinkage stoping is a short-hole mining method which is suitable for steeply dipping orebodies. This method is similar to cut and fill mining with the exception that after being blasted, broken ore is left in the stope where it is used to support the surrounding rock and as a platform from which to work. Only enough ore is removed from the stope to allow for drilling and blasting the next slice. The stope is emptied when all of the ore has been blasted. Although it is very selective and allows for low dilution, since most of the ore stays in the stope until mining is completed, there is a delayed return on capital investments.
- VRM/ VCR: Vertical retreat mining (VRM) also known as Vertical crater retreat (VCR) is a method where mine is divided in vertical zones with depth of about 50 meters using open stoping, bottom-up mining. Long-hole large-diameter holes are drilled vertically into the ore body from the top using in-the-hole (ITH) drills, and then blasting horizontal slices of the ore body into an undercut. Ore blasted in retrieval taken in phase. This retrieval is done from bottom of the section developed. Last cleaning of ore is done through remote controlled LHD machines. A system of primary and secondary stopes is often used in VCR mining, where primary stopes are mined in the first stage and then backfilled with cemented fill to provide wall support for the blasting of successive stopes. Side chambers will be mined in pre-planned sequence after the fill has solidified.

=== Bulk mining methods ===
- Block caving is used to mine massive steeply dipping orebodies (typically low grade) with high friability. An undercut with haulage access is driven under the orebody, with "drawbells" excavated between the top of the haulage level and the bottom of the undercut. The drawbells serve as a place for caving rock to fall into. The orebody is drilled and blasted above the undercut, and the ore is removed via the haulage access. Due to the friability of the orebody the ore above the first blast caves and falls into the drawbells. As ore is removed from the drawbells the orebody caves in, providing a steady stream of ore. If caving stops and removal of ore from the drawbells continues, a large void may form, resulting in the potential for a sudden and massive collapse and potentially catastrophic windblast throughout the mine. Where caving does continue, the ground surface may collapse into a surface depression such as those at the Climax and Henderson molybdenum mines in Colorado. Such a configuration is one of several to which miners apply the term "glory hole".

Orebodies that do not cave readily are sometimes preconditioned by hydraulic fracturing, blasting, or by a combination of both. Hydraulic fracturing has been applied to preconditioning strong roof rock over coal longwall panels, and to inducing caving in both coal and hard rock mines.

- Room and pillar : Room and pillar mining is commonly done in flat or gently dipping bedded ore bodies. Pillars are left in place in a regular pattern while the rooms are mined out. In many room and pillar mines, the pillars are taken out starting at the farthest point from the stope access, allowing the roof to collapse and fill in the stope. This allows for greater recovery as less ore is left behind in pillars.
- Sublevel caving
- Raise caving : This is a method designed for high-angle orebodies at depth where regional stresseses are high. In raise caving the rock masses are de-stressed by establishing slots parallel to the dip of the orebody. It is a new method under development by LKAB in northern Sweden.

== Ore removal ==
In mines which use rubber-tired equipment for coarse ore removal, the ore (or "muck") is removed ("mucked out" or "bogged") from the stope using center articulated vehicles. These vehicles are referred to as "boggers" or LHD (Load, Haul, Dump machines). These pieces of equipment may operate using diesel engines or electric motors, and resemble a low-profile front end loader. Electrically powered LHD utilize trailing cables which are flexible and can be extended or retracted on a reel.

In shallower mines the ore is then dumped into a truck to be hauled to the surface. In deeper mines, the ore is dumped down an ore pass (a vertical or near vertical excavation) where it falls to a collection level. On the collection level, it may receive primary crushing by a jaw or cone crusher, or by a rockbreaker. The ore is then moved by conveyor belts, trucks or occasionally trains to the shaft to be hoisted to the surface in buckets or skips and emptied into bins beneath the surface headframe for transport to the mill.

In some cases the underground primary crusher feeds an inclined conveyor belt which delivers ore via an incline shaft direct to the surface. The ore is fed down ore passes, with mining equipment accessing the ore body via a decline from the surface.

== Deepest mines ==
- The deepest mines in the world are the Mponeng and TauTona (Western Deep Levels) gold mines in the Witwatersrand region of South Africa, which are currently working at depths exceeding 3,900 m (12,800 ft).
- The deepest inactive mine in Asia is the Kolar in the Karnataka region of India. Closed in 2001, the main shaft had reached a depth of 10,560 ft (3,220 m).
  This region is also the location of the harshest conditions for hard rock mining, with air temperatures of up to 45 °C (113 °F). However, massive refrigeration plants are used to bring the temperature down to around 28 °C (82 °F).
- The deepest inactive hard rock mine in North America is the Empire mine in Grass Valley California. Closed in 1956 the main shaft had reached an incline depth of 11,007 ft (3,355 m). The combined length of all shafts is 367 miles (591 km).
- The deepest active hard rock mine in North America is Kidd Mine in Canada, which mines zinc and copper in Timmins, Ontario. At the maximum depth of 9,889 feet (3,014 m) this mine is the deepest base metal mine in the world, and its low surface elevation means that the bottom of the mine is the deepest accessible non-marine point on earth.
- LaRonde's Penna shaft (#3 shaft) is believed to be the deepest single lift shaft in the Western Hemisphere. The new #4 shaft bottoms out at 2,840 m (9,320 ft) down. LaRonde mine expansion was completed in June 2016 at the depth of 3,008 m (9,869 ft), the deepest longhole open stopes in the world.
- The deepest active mine in Eurasia and in Asia is Skalisty Mine of Nornickel, located in Talnakh. In September 2018 it reaches depth of 2,056 m (6,745 ft) below surface.
- The deepest mine in Europe is the Shaft 16 of the uranium mines in Příbram, Czech Republic at 1,838 m (6,030 ft).
- The deepest hard rock mines in Australia are the copper and zinc lead mines in Mount Isa, Queensland at 1,800 m (5,900 ft).
- The deepest platinum-palladium mines in the world are on the Merensky Reef, in South Africa, with a resource of 203 million troy ounces, currently worked to a depth of approximately 2,200 m (7,200 ft).
- The deepest borehole is the Kola Superdeep Borehole in Murmansk Oblast, Russia. At 12,262 m (40,230 ft), it is the deepest artificial extreme point of Earth.

== See also ==
- Adit
- Gold mining
- Mining
- Pinge
- Shaft sinking
- General Mining Act of 1872
- Stoping
