= Igor Khait =

American animator

- Born: August 2, 1963
- Died: March 28, 2016 (aged 52); Los Angeles, California, U.S.
- Education: UC Santa Cruz; California Institute of the Arts
- Occupations: Animator; animation producer

Igor Khait (August 2, 1963 – March 28, 2016) was an American animator and animation producer.

After graduating from UC Santa Cruz with a Bachelor of Arts in fine art, and an additional BA in film graphics and animation from the California Institute of the Arts, Khait started his career in 1989, working at Amblin Entertainment. While there, he took part in the production of the short-lived CBS series Family Dog, which was produced by Steven Spielberg and Tim Burton, as well as the short A Wish for Wings That Work.

Throughout the 1990s, Khait worked as a production manager on Bebe's Kids and Quest for Camelot, as well as Atlantis: The Lost Empire in the 2000s before working as an animation producer on projects such as Brother Bear, Leroy & Stitch, Everyone's Hero, Gnomeo & Juliet and The Lego Movie. Prior to his death, Khait was working on the animated film Sing.

Khait died on March 28, 2016, after a year-long battle with pancreatic cancer at the age of 52. The end credits of Sing are dedicated to him.
