= Jess Winfield =

American author, screenwriter, and voice actor

- Born: Jesse Morris Borgeson; March 8, 1961 (age 65); Los Angeles County, California, U.S.
- Occupations: Novelist; author; screenwriter; voice actor; editor
- Spouse: Sandra Thomson (m. 1993)
- Writing career
- Years active: 1981–2017 (theatre and television); 2015–present (magazine editor)

Jesse Morris Winfield (né Borgeson; born March 8, 1961) is an American novelist, self-help author, television writer, voice actor, and magazine editor who is a founding member of The Reduced Shakespeare Company. His books include: What Would Shakespeare Do (2000) and My Name Is Will (2008). He wrote for and served as an executive producer of a number of animated television series, including Teacher's Pet and Lilo & Stitch: The Series. He also served as the voice actor for Jumba Jookiba in the latter series' franchise in the English versions of the anime Stitch! and the Chinese animated series Stitch & Ai, the latter being his last animated television work to date.

According to his personal LinkedIn profile, he currently works as a freelance editor for American Road magazine.

== Early life ==
Jess Winfield was born Jess Borgeson, and changed his surname to Winfield in 1993 after marrying his wife, Sandra Thomson; his works prior to 1993 refer to him under his original surname.

== Theatrical work ==
In 1981, Winfield joined writer-performer Adam Long and actor Daniel Singer to found the Reduced Shakespeare Company, a collective dedicated to the writing and performing of Shakespearean parodies. In 1987, the Company presented The Complete Works of William Shakespeare (Abridged), which became an international hit and, eventually, the longest-running comedy production in London's West End, where it was nominated for a Laurence Olivier Award for Best New Comedy in 1997. He contributed to the editing and adapting of The Complete Works for publication and television performance.

== Television ==
After departing from The Reduced Shakespeare Company, Winfield served as a writer for the Daytime Emmy Award-winning series Teacher's Pet (starring Nathan Lane and Jerry Stiller). He worked extensively for Disney's Lilo & Stitch franchise, writing the animated features Stitch! The Movie and Leroy & Stitch (also serving as a dialogue director), executive producing Lilo & Stitch: The Series, and voicing Jumba Jookiba in the English versions of Stitch! and Stitch & Ai, taking over the role from David Ogden Stiers (who later died in March 2018, the month after Stitch & Ai's original English version first aired). He has also written scripts for several other television series such as Mickey Mouse Works, All-New Dennis the Menace, House of Mouse, The Penguins of Madagascar, The Legend of Tarzan, Buzz Lightyear of Star Command, 101 Dalmatians: The Series, The Savage Dragon, The Incredible Hulk and Hercules.

== Author ==
Winfield is the author of What Would Shakespeare Do (Ulysses Press, 2000), a self-help book that employs Shakespearean drama as a basis for advice. In 2008, he published the novel My Name Is Will (Twelve/Hachette Book Group, 2008). The work uses a historically plausible story of William Shakespeare's young adulthood in conjunction with a comic modern plot to explore themes of religious persecution, authorial intent, and human sexuality. It has been stated that the modern portion of the novel's plot has been based, in part, on Winfield's years studying Shakespeare in Santa Cruz and Berkeley.

== Credits ==
=== Television ===
Year	Title	Writer	Producer	Voice actor	Notes
1993	Adventures of Sonic the Hedgehog	Yes			Episodes: "Big Daddy", "King Coconuts", "The Robots' Robot"; Credited as Jess Borgeson
1993	The All-New Dennis the Menace	Yes			Episode: "Pig Out"
1994–1996	Biker Mice from Mars	Yes			Ten episodes
1995	Action Man	Yes			Episodes: "The Outside Edge" and "Space Wars"
1996	The Incredible Hulk	Yes			Episode: "Raw Power"
1996	The Savage Dragon	Yes			Episode: "Star"
1996	Beast Wars: Transformers	Yes			Episodes: "Chain of Command" and "Double Jeopardy"; Credited as Jesse Winfield
1997–1998	101 Dalmatians: The Series	Yes			Episodes: "Two for the Show", "Watch for Falling Idols", "Smoke Detectors", "Lobster Tale", "The Good-Bye Chick", "The Making Of..."
1998	Disney's Hercules: The Animated Series	Yes			Episodes: "Hercules and the Big Kiss", "...River Styx", "...Hostage Crisis", "...Big Games", "...Falling Stars", "...Twilight of the Gods"
1999	Mickey Mouse Works	Yes			Episodes 7, 9–12
2000	Buzz Lightyear of Star Command	Yes			Unknown episodes
2001, 2003	The Legend of Tarzan	Yes			Episodes: "Tarzan and the New Wave", "Tarzan and the Flying Ace" (also teleplay)
2001–2002	House of Mouse	Yes			Reused cartoons from Mickey Mouse Works
2002	Teacher's Pet	Yes	Executive		Wrote two episodes: "Double Dog Dare" and "A Breed Apart"; Executive produced season two
2003–2006	Lilo & Stitch: The Series	Yes	Executive	Yes	Wrote one episode: "Snafu"; Executive produced all episodes Provided additional voices in select episodes
2009–2013, 2014, 2016	Stitch!		Co-producer	Yes	International re-version of anime series Credited as co-producer for the first two seasons and as "reversion consulting producer" in the third season English dub voice of Dr. Jumba Jookiba
2011	The Penguins of Madagascar	Yes			Episode: "Operation: Break-speare"
2017	Stitch & Ai			Yes	English-language-produced Chinese animated series (English version released 2018); English voice of Dr. Jumba Jookiba

=== Film ===
Year	Title	Writer	Producer	Voice actor	Notes
2002	Tarzan & Jane	Yes			Film uses "Tarzan and the Flying Ace"
2003	Stitch! The Movie	Yes	Yes	Yes	Voice credit under "With the Voice Talents Of"
2006	Leroy & Stitch	Yes	Yes		Also dialogue director

=== Stage theater ===
- The Complete Works of William Shakespeare (Abridged) (1987)
