= Box cut =

Mine entrance type

A box cut (box pit) is a small open cut built to supply a secure and safe entrance as access to a slope to an underground mine. Generally the box cut is sunk until sufficiently unweathered rock is found to permit the development of the decline. The portal is generally made safe with rock bolts, wire mesh, and shotcrete, which prevents accidental rock falls from closing access to the decline.

== See also ==
- Underground hard-rock mining
