= Stitch! =

2008 Japanese anime television spin-off of Disney's Lilo & Stitch franchise

- English logo

スティッチ! (Suticchi!)
- Genre: Science fiction; Comedy
- Anime television series

Stitch!
- Directed by: Fumihiro Yoshimura; Masami Hata
- Produced by: Yasuteru Iwase; Masao Maruyama (executive producer); Jamie Simone (executive producer; international reversion); Jess Winfield (co-producer; international reversion); Rita Majkut (international reversion)
- Written by: Yūko Kakihara; Shōji Yonemura
- Music by: Yoshihisa Suzuki (Japan), Thorsten Laewe (USA, International)
- Studio: Walt Disney Television International Japan; Madhouse
- Licensed by: Disney–ABC Domestic Television
- Original network: TV Tokyo; Disney Channel
- English network: AU: Seven Network, 7TWO, 7mate; AUS: Disney Channel; SEA: Disney XD; US: Disney XD; TW: Disney Channel
- Original run: October 8, 2008 – June 26, 2009
- Episodes: 26 (including 1 special)
- Anime television series

Stitch! ~ The Mischievous Alien's Great Adventure ~
- Directed by: Masami Hata
- Produced by: Michiyo Hayashi; Yoshiie Ayugai; Takahiro Kishimoto; Masao Maruyama (executive producer); Jamie Simone (executive producer; international reversion); Jess Winfield (co-producer; international reversion); Rita Majkut (international reversion)
- Written by: Ayako Katō; Yūko Kakihara
- Music by: Yoshihisa Suzuki (Japan), Thorsten Laewe (USA, International)
- Studio: Walt Disney Television International Japan; Madhouse
- Original network: TV Asahi; Disney Channel
- Original run: October 13, 2009 – June 29, 2010
- Episodes: 30 (31 segments) (including 1 special)
- Video game

Disney Stitch Jam (Note: Stitch! DS: Ohana to Rhythm de Daibouken (スティッチ！DS オハナとリズムで大冒険; Stitch! DS: A Great Adventure of Ohana and Rhythm))
- Developer: Cattle Call
- Publisher: Disney Interactive Studios
- Directed by: Tomoyuki Uno
- Produced by: Kentaro Hisai
- Music by: Takayuki Nakamura
- Genre: Rhythm
- Platform: Nintendo DS
- Released: JP: December 3, 2009; NA: March 23, 2010; EU: March 26, 2010
- Anime television series

Stitch! ~ Best Friends Forever ~
- Directed by: Tetsuo Yasumi
- Produced by: Satoshi Kubo; Yoshiie Ayugai; Matsuhisa Tomoharu; Jamie Simone (reversion supervising producer); Jess Winfield (reversion consulting producer); Rita Majkut (international reversion)
- Written by: Mio Aiuchi
- Music by: Kōtarō Nakagawa (Japan), Thorsten Laewe (USA, International)
- Studio: Walt Disney Television International Japan; Shin-Ei Animation
- Original network: TV Asahi; Disney Channel
- English network: Disney Channel Asia
- Original run: July 6, 2010 – June 19, 2011
- Episodes: 30 (including 1 special)
- Video game

Motto! Stitch! DS: Rhythm de Rakugaki Daisakusen ♪ (Note: もっと！スティッチ！DS リズムでラクガキ大作戦♪; lit. More! Stitch! DS: Great Mission to Doodle in Rhythm)
- Developer: Cattle Call
- Publisher: Disney Interactive Studios
- Music by: Takayuki Nakamura
- Genre: Rhythm
- Platform: Nintendo DS
- Released: JP: November 18, 2010
- Anime television film

Stitch and the Planet of Sand
- Studio: Walt Disney Television International Japan; Shin-Ei Animation
- Original network: Disney Channel
- Released: June 16, 2012
- Anime television film

Stitch! Perfect Memory
- Studio: Walt Disney Television International Japan; Shin-Ei Animation
- Original network: Disney Channel
- Released: August 7, 2015

Stitch! (スティッチ!, Sutitchi!) (Note: Alternately titled Yuna & Stitch for the German dub, and colloquially referred to as the "Stitch! anime" to avoid confusion with Stitch! The Movie and the title character.) is a Japanese anime television series. It is a spin-off of Disney's Lilo & Stitch franchise, serving as the franchise's second television series after Lilo & Stitch: The Series. The anime series aired in Japan from October 2008 to June 2011, later receiving additional television specials in 2012 and 2015. It features a Japanese girl named Yuna Kamihara, who takes the place of Lilo Pelekai as the best friend of the titular Stitch, and is set on a fictional island in the Ryukyus off the shore of Okinawa called Izayoi for its first two seasons, replacing Kauai, Hawaii, then moving to a fictional Okinawan city called New Town for its third season.

The first arc of the series, which serves as the first season outside Japan, was produced by Madhouse and aired from October 8, 2008, to March 25, 2009, with a post-season special on June 26, 2009, also known as "Stitch Day" in reference to Stitch's experiment number (626). A second arc of the original series, called Stitch! ~The Mischievous Alien's Great Adventure~ (スティッチ! ～いたずらエイリアンの大冒険～, Sutitchi! ~Itazura Eirian no Daibōken~) aired in Japan from October 13, 2009, to June 29, 2010, with another post-season special on August 8, 2010, completing Madhouse's 56-episode run. A 29-episode sequel series from the original two-arc anime, entitled Stitch! ~Best Friends Forever~ (スティッチ! ～ずっと最高のトモダチ～, Sutitchi! ~Zutto Saikō no Tomodachi~), was produced by Shin-Ei Animation and aired on TV Asahi from July 6, 2010, to March 8, 2011, with a post-season special for this season on June 19, 2011. Shin-Ei then produced two more TV specials, known as Stitch! New Specials, that continued from the series. The first special, Stitch and the Planet of Sand (スティッチと砂の惑星, Sutitchi to Suna no Wakusei), aired on June 16, 2012. The second post-series TV special, Stitch! Perfect Memory (スティッチ！パーフェクト・メモリー, Sutitchi! Pāfekuto Memorī), (Note: Alternately titled Stitch! A Perfect Memory in English promotional material.) was announced on June 26, 2015, and aired on August 7, 2015. No further specials were produced after Perfect Memory, as Stitch! would be succeeded in the franchise by the Chinese animated series Stitch & Ai in 2017.

== Plot ==
=== Stitch! (season 1) ===
Set years after the events of Leroy & Stitch, Stitch has left Lilo after she went to college. He had stolen a space scooter from his creator Dr. Jumba Jookiba and reverted to his destructive programming in Lilo's absence. As Stitch was being chased by Jumba out in space, the two got caught in a wormhole. Jumba crash-lands on an asteroid in one of Saturn's rings, where he reunites with Pleakley, who had been stranded there while out on a mission about two weeks prior to the anime's events.

Meanwhile, Stitch ends up back on Earth, crash-landing on Izayoi Island, a small island in the Ryukyus. There he meets Yuna, a tomboyish girl who lives with her grandmother, practices karate, and whose marine biologist father is long out at sea working on his job. After some initial friction caused by Stitch causing chaos around the island looking for and eating lots of food and then getting temporarily stranded in a storm, the two befriend each other, and Yuna and her Gramma bring Stitch into their home. The two Izayoi Islanders show Stitch the Chitama Forest, a forest filled with magical yōkai who live there, and the Chitama Spiritual Stone, a large magical stone in the forest that provides the lifeforce of the yōkai and can grant wishes, provided that someone does 43 good deeds to prove themselves worthy of getting their wish granted. Stitch decides that he wants to become the strongest being and ruler of the universe for his wish. Jumba and Pleakley later escape Saturn and rejoin Stitch on Izayoi, and the two aliens decide to stay on the island, joining Stitch's new family and helping him get his wish granted, with Jumba creating a "good deed counter" to help Stitch keep track of his progress.

Stitch does good deeds while enjoying his new life with Yuna on Izayoi, with them befriending various yōkai. They befriend Kijimunaa, a little yōkai with long red hair who has a powerful sneeze, after they help him get his home tree back from a bully yōkai, and he becomes a close ally to them. Meanwhile, Stitch's old nemesis and Jumba's former partner-in-crime Jacques von Hämsterviel is at large, living in a laboratory hideout hidden on an asteroid along with Gantu and Experiment 625/Reuben, both of whom were re-hired by Hämsterviel after having been discharged from the United Galactic Federation in the interim between the events of Leroy & Stitch and this series. (In the English dub, Gantu says he was dishonorably discharged for singing karaoke poorly during a holiday party.) Hämsterviel, with Gantu and Reuben's help, spies on Stitch and learns about Stitch's new goal and eventually, by the end of the season, the Spiritual Stone. Hämsterviel goes after Stitch to take ultimate power from the stone himself.

Three of Stitch and Reuben's fellow experiments also appear during this season. Experiment 221/Sparky was somehow captured by Hämsterviel after the events of Leroy, and Hämsterviel uses a mind control helmet to get Sparky to attack Stitch. However, the Spiritual Stone eventually uses its power to destroy the helmet, bringing Sparky back to his previous friendlier self, thus allowing him to resume being one of Stitch's closest "cousins". Sparky is given a new job or "one true place" on the island, using his electrical powers at a local hair salon (this job isn't depicted in the international reversion that the English dub uses). Experiment 010/Felix was inexplicably somewhere out in space until Stitch calls for him in one episode to get out of doing cleaning, which goes well until Felix runs out of filth to clean and begins sucking up old antique things. After Jumba reprograms Felix to prevent him from further cleaning antiques, and Stitch manages to return the antique items to their owners, Felix is given a new "one true place" working for Izayoi's recycling department. Finally, Experiment 624/Angel, who has become an intergalactically popular singer in the time after Leroy, reunites with Stitch after somehow finding out where he now lives. The two resume being a romantic couple, with Angel making visits to the island during breaks on her concert tour to continue her relationship with Stitch.

In the two-part season finale "Stitch vs. Hämsterviel", Hämsterviel manages to mind control Jumba to successfully steal the Spiritual Stone's power and transfer some of it to him, becoming more powerful than Stitch. He then captures Stitch, shrinking him and trapping him in a nigh-indestructible container. However, Yuna rescues Stitch, and the Spiritual Stone temporarily transfers its remaining power to him. Stitch successfully defeats Hämsterviel, returning the Spiritual Stone's power to it, and sends him, Gantu, and Reuben to galactic prison. However, Stitch is returned to his original strength afterward, much to his dismay, as he still needs to do more good deeds to keep the "ultimate power".

=== Stitch! ~The Mischievous Alien's Great Adventure~ (season 2) ===
Stitch continues to live his life with Yuna, doing more good deeds for his wish to be granted and meeting more yōkai and other strange beings along the way. Meanwhile, Hämsterviel, Gantu, and Reuben escape from prison at the beginning of the season and return to their hideout, and Hämsterviel plots to re-gain the Spiritual Stone's power.

Three new characters join this season. During the villains' time in prison, Hämsterviel finds a strange, purple, female, insect-like alien with shapeshifting abilities, and sends her to Earth to break Stitch's good deed counter. When Jumba repairs the counter, he and Pleakley find the purple alien and discover that it was brainwashed by Hämsterviel. After undoing the brainwashing and fixing Stitch's counter, the insect becomes the aliens' new pet who Pleakley names "BooGoo", as she is only able to say the words, "Boo goo!" Later on, two more people move onto Izayoi Island; Sasha, a transfer student who becomes Yuna's newest friend, and Tigerlily Sakai, Yuna's beautiful and talented but mean cousin who bullies her and Stitch. Yuna also reunites with her father in a couple episodes. Additionally, more experiments, both originating from Lilo & Stitch: The Series and newly introduced to the franchise, appear from this season onward, with most of them now inexplicably under Hämsterviel's possession. However, the heroes manage to re-tame them.

At the end of this season (and, in turn, Madhouse's run of the series), Stitch finally gains the 43 good deeds after saving the galaxy from a warhead fired by Experiment Zero, an experiment Jumba made before he gave proper numbers to his experiments, by redirecting it into a black hole just as it explodes. Although Stitch seemingly dies in the explosion, he survives thanks to the Spiritual Stone teleporting him back to Earth and to Yuna. As they reunite, he reveals to her that he used his wish to live with her forever, having decided that living with her is better than being the strongest in the universe.

=== Stitch! ~Best Friends Forever~ (season 3) and Stitch! New Specials (post-series specials) ===
Yuna, Stitch, Tigerlily, Jumba, Pleakley, and BooGoo move to a city called Okinawa New Town, with the former three living together in a small house just outside the city limits. In New Town, Yuna meets her new classmates, and she and Stitch go on various adventures around the city. Hämsterviel, now living on a space station orbiting Earth with Gantu and Reuben, partners with an evil alien woman named Delia, who desires to retrieve a power cell within Stitch called (only in the Japanese version) the "Neo-PowerChip" so she can create a powerful experiment of her own. Hämsterviel sends out Gantu, Reuben, and several of Stitch's "cousins"—who Hämsterviel had brainwashed and "transmutated" beforehand—on various missions to try to attack and capture Stitch so he can be teleported over to Delia. However, Hämsterviel always fails, often resulting in him getting tortured by Delia. Lilo, now an adult with a daughter of her own named Ani, also returns in one episode of this season for a brief reunion and reconciliation with Stitch.

In the final two episodes of the season, Delia manages to steal a new prototype power cell from Jumba and uses it to create her experiment named "Dark End", who then attacks Stitch on Delia's behalf and nearly kills him. Stitch's friends revive him through their love and support of him, overcharging his power cell, and he overpowers and defeats Dark End, saving the world again and sending Hämsterviel, Gantu, and Reuben back to galactic prison along with Delia.

In both of the post-series specials, Stitch and the Planet of Sand and Stitch! Perfect Memory, Stitch and Pleakley go out on missions assigned to them by the United Galactic Federation, finding out Hämsterviel, Gantu, and Reuben are behind more crimes.

== Episodes ==
Season	Title	Studio	Episodes	Originally released		
Season	Title	Studio	Episodes	First released	Last released	Network
1	Stitch!	Madhouse	25 + 1 special	October 8, 2008	June 26, 2009	TV Tokyo
2	Stitch! ~The Mischievous Alien's Great Adventure~	Madhouse	29 (Note: 30 segments) + 1 special	October 13, 2009	August 8, 2010	TV Asahi
3	Stitch! ~Best Friends Forever~	Shin-Ei Animation	29 + 1 special	July 6, 2010	July 19, 2011	TV Asahi
Post-series specials	Stitch! New Specials	Shin-Ei Animation	2 specials	June 16, 2012	August 7, 2015	Disney Channel Japan

== Characters ==
=== Main characters ===
Stitch (スティッチ, Sutitchi)
Also known as Experiment 626, he is an alien who one day ends up falling to an island located on Earth, called Izayoi Island, off the coast of Okinawa. In the Madhouse run, he discovers the "Spiritual Stone" on Izayoi, with the help of his new friend Yuna, and learns it can grant his wish of becoming ruler of the universe, provided he does 43 good deeds. Thus, with his Good Deed Counter made by Jumba, he is able to keep track of his good deeds. However, he has mischievous tendencies that often make him lose deeds due to his overabundance of such things. He eventually gains the 43 good deeds at the end of Stitch! ~The Mischievous Alien's Great Adventure~ but decides that living with Yuna is better than having ultimate power and chooses to live with her forever instead. In Stitch! ~Best Friends Forever~, he, Yuna, Jumba, Pleakley, and Zuruko/Tigerlily all move to the city of Okinawa New Town, continuing to live his life with them. Notably, in the English dub, Stitch also becomes a more fluent English speaker in this series compared to the original films and first TV series, reflecting the passage of time since the events of Leroy & Stitch. (The Japanese original, however, maintains his flawed human speech from past works.)
Yuna Kamihara (上原ユウナ, Kamihara Yūna)
Yuna is a young Japanese girl; a tomboy at that, and is a 10-year-old 4th grade elementary school student (11-year-old 5th grade elementary school student in Stitch! ~Best Friends Forever~, albeit with her move to Okinawa New Town) who lives on a fictional island off the shore of Okinawa in the Ryukyus called Izayoi Island. Her personality is sweet and outgoing, while still tough and feisty all in all. Living on Izayoi Island, she learns and studies karate, having learned it from her grandpa. Her grandpa also did the honor of giving her a special type of star and, as a good luck charm in her study of karate before he left. Yuna lives a rather normal cherished life with her grandma. The other majority of her family are elsewhere, her father is out at work a lot as a marine biologist around Okinawa, and her mother died when she was an infant in a typhoon. Her life remained normal yet happy until one day, after a varied coincidence, she meets a strange creature that came crashlanding from the Turo system of outer space, Experiment 626, or as we know him, Stitch. From then and there when they met, the two became best friends and the duo go on various adventures on Stitch's quest in order to be "good". Yuna though has a strong sense of justice and an overbearing attitude, which make her a tomboy, and that shows throughout the series. The creators of the anime got Yuna's name from the Japanese name of sea hibiscus out in Okinawa (known in Japanese as Yuna). Yuna's birthday is February 25. It can be assumed that Yuna's favorite animal is a porpoise or dolphin from a few instances in the series. Yuna isn't good at mathematics, often getting low scores on math tests. Yuna's last name, Kamihara, wasn't unveiled until much later, although previous guesses were Chitama, after the dojo and the forest on Izayoi and Hanako, which was Yuna's previous name and design during the development of the anime.
Dr. Jumba Jookiba (ジャンバ博士(はかせ), Janba Hakase; lit. 'Doctor Jumba')
Jumba is an "evil genius" scientist, the one who created Stitch and the other 625 experiments made before him. He is assigned by the Galactic Council to watch over Stitch and lives with Yuna and Gramma/Obaa. He is more friendly in this series than the original and has less of a penchant for evil.
Pleakley (プリークリー, Purīkurī)
He is a one-eyed alien working for the Galactic Council and an Earth expert. He is Jumba's best friend and lives with him along with Yuna, Gramma, and Stitch.
Gramma (おばあ, Obaa)
Yuna's paternal grandmother whom Yuna lives with during the Madhouse seasons. She is the mother-in-law of Yuna's late mother. She is a very patient elderly woman who is well-regarded for her kind words and wisdom.
Kijimunaa (キジムナー, Kijimuna)
He is a little yokai who is Yuna and Stitch's friend. He is kind of a coward, but with the help of his friends, he can find the courage to best whatever he can. He appears only in the Madhouse seasons.
Tigerlily Sakai / Zuruko Sasuga (さすがつるこ, Sasuga Zuruko)
Yuna's mean, bullying cousin who appears midway through The Mischievous Alien's Great Adventure. Although she may seem nice at first glance, being kind-hearted to others, she is harsh and cruel to Yuna for unknown reasons and constantly blackmails her into doing all the chores around the house (although she later claims that she's only trying to be a role model for Yuna). But when Yuna and Stitch move off to live with her in Best Friends Forever, she becomes more friendly with Yuna and treats her nicer, although she still forces her to do most of the house chores.

=== Other characters ===
Angel (エンジェル, Enjeru)
Also known as Experiment 624, she is a pink female experiment who is Stitch's love interest. Stitch is madly in love with her and she shares the same feeling. Having become an intergalactic singing icon, Angel travels a lot, but she stops at the island, at times, to visit Stitch and Yuna. It turns out that while Stitch is immune to Angel's song if sung by her, it still will turn him evil if it's sung in a different voice. She is the only recurring experiment apart from Stitch and Reuben to appear in all three seasons, and she also appears in Stitch and the Planet of Sand.
Sparky (スパーキー, Spaakii)
Also known as Experiment 221, he is a yellow male experiment with electrical abilities who is one of Stitch's cousins. He only appears in the Madhouse seasons and the third season episode "Stitch's Birthday, Part Two".
Felix (フィリックス, Firikkusu)
Also known as Experiment 010, he is a green male experiment that cleans up anything, but when he runs out of things to clean, he sucks up things that are old. He only appears in the Madhouse seasons.
Penny / Piko (ピコ)
A blonde girl who is Yuna's rival in the Madhouse seasons. Piko/Penny is self-centered, impatient, and in some cases, a bit snobby. She often takes great pride to mock and deride Yuna and Stitch in any case, often ending with Yuna and her fighting. There are rare occasions where she and Yuna can get along though. Her father runs the island's pineapple plants and her family runs the highest-rated hotels and resorts on Izayoi. There's a habit with Piko/Penny where when she's angered, she'll often end her ranting with a comparison of something akin to pineapples. She is also a black-team karate leader. Piko/Penny may have been idealized after the Hawaiian pop song "Pineapple Princess". Piko/Penny dislikes Sae/Sasha but secretly does believe that she dresses better than her.
Kenny / Kouji (こうじ, Kōji)
A brown-haired boy in the Madhouse seasons who is Piko/Penny's older brother. He is a bully who hangs out with his best friends and fellow bullies Marvin (Masa) and Ted (Taka). Despite their bullying nature, all three boys get bossed around by Piko/Penny.
BooGoo (ブーグー)
A strange, purple, jellyfish-like alien insect with shapeshifting abilities introduced at the beginning of The Mischievous Alien's Great Adventure. She was found by Dr. Hämsterviel at a galactic prison that he, Gantu, and Reuben escape from at the beginning of the season, and he sends her to Izayoi to break Stitch's Good Deed Counter, causing his good deeds to be counted as bad deeds and vice versa. After Jumba disables Hämsterviel's control over her and fixes Stitch's Good Deed Counter, BooGoo becomes Jumba and Pleakley's new pet. She and Stitch do not get along, however; she annoys him and tends to eat his food, which angers him greatly as he loves to eat.
Sandra "Sasha" / Sae (さえ)
A young girl about Yuna's age who only appears in The Mischievous Alien's Great Adventure. A transfer student from Kobe, she joins Yuna's class during the second season. She believes in good fashion and beauty, and is girly in spirit, often talking about fashion, love, and all. She's also quite ditzy at times. She believes Yuna has a good fashion sense and becomes good friends with her; as her fashion sense reminded her of her mother, a tropical fashion designer. Her father is a doctor. She not only has a rather brave personality, like Yuna; but she has a sweet and gentle personality too. Kouji/Kenny has a crush on Sae/Sasha, unbeknownst to her, and Piko/Penny secretly dislikes Sae/Sasha but believes that Sae/Sasha dresses better than she does.
Hiroman / Takumi (タクミ)
A boy from Okinawa New Town who only appears in Best Friends Forever. A popular soccer player and the love interest of Reika/Jessica, he often acts cool and calm. He bears a secret of acting as a maid to his sisters and even dressing up in bishoujo-styled outfits for his sisters' enjoyment. His English name is obviously a play on "hero man". It is hinted that he and Yuna have feelings for each other since Yuna often saves him from trouble; in the episode "Dorkifier", it was shown that Yuna blushed at him.
Dolores / Ms. Toyoda (豊(とよ)田(だ)さん, Toyoda-san)
An intelligent girl from Okinawa New Town who only appears in Best Friends Forever. She is Yuna's classmate and reluctant new friend/acquaintance. She comes across as aloof and prefers her studies over being with others.
Jessica / Reika (レイカ)
Yuna's rival in Best Friends Forever. She has a crush on Takumi/Hiroman and friends who she bosses around. She, like Piko/Penny from the first two seasons, likes to mock and deride Stitch and Yuna. She also bears a trait of saying rather dull jokes and puns, often met with a silent response. She is followed by two girls, Toriko (トリ子(こ)) and Makiko (マキ子(こ)), who fake laughing hysterically at her foolish jokes.
Lilo Pelekai
A character who was Stitch's best friend in the past, but one day she left for college. She was initially mentioned only in the English dub due to Disney intertwining Stitch! with Leroy & Stitch (and the television series preceding it) for said dub. The Japanese original initially little to no direct mention of Lilo, though they do mention a "bigger Hawaiian girl" in episode 2 similar to the main character in this series. She eventually appears in episode 23 of Best Friends Forever, when Lilo visits Okinawa in cahoots to reunite with Stitch, only for a while though. Lilo is now grown up and has a daughter who looks like her when she was younger, named Ani.

=== Villains ===
Jacques von Hämsterviel (ハムスターフィール博士(はかせ), Hamusutāfīru Hakase; lit. 'Doctor Hämsterviel')
A villain who was a college buddy of Jumba. Much like the rest of the franchise, he bears a want to defeat Stitch. Hämsterviel also wishes to steal Stitch's Good Deed Counter in order to gain ultimate power.
Gantu (ガントゥ)
He works under Dr. Hämsterviel, to steal Stitch's Good Deed Counter. According to the English dub, Gantu was dishonorably discharged from his Galactic Federation job due to bad karaoke singing. He bears an over-obsession to a television drama called Red Rose Maiden, or The Young and the Stupid in the English dub. He has a huge crush on the main character of the drama, Princess Michigo.
Reuben (ルーベン)
Also known as Experiment 625, he has all of the same powers as Stitch and works alongside Gantu, but he is lazy and eats sandwiches. Dr. Hämsterviel claims he doesn't do much besides making sandwiches all the time. During the series he isn't much of an enemy to Stitch, even coming to visit him sometimes. During "Reuben's Rice Balls", he becomes fond of rice balls and even includes them among his sandwich ingredients.
Zero (Experiment 000) (試作品000号; lit. 'Prototype Number 000')
An evil black-furred experiment who looks like a cyborg version of Stitch. He was made before Jumba started numbering experiments. He was made to cause destruction, like Stitch is, but was too violent and uncontrollable for Jumba. He only appears in the season two finale.
Delia (デリア)
An evil alien woman in a partnership with Dr. Jacques von Hämsterviel to get the Neo-PowerChip that is inside of Stitch. Delia altered a majority of the experiments, which had caused them to become physically stronger and evil, and Angel, who is rescued by Stitch. Delia usually calls Dr. Jacques von Hämsterviel the wrong name such as Hamu Sama or Hämusta Sama and then, when Hämsterviel's plans go wrong, she eventually punishes him based on whatever scheme he used.
Dark End
An experiment made by Delia who is designed to be much stronger than Stitch and his cousins. They are not among Stitch's cousins, as neither Jumba nor Hämsterviel made them. They only appear in the final two episodes of the third season (not including the post-season special episode "Ace's Back!"). Dark End's gender differs between dubs, being female in the Japanese original and male in the English dub.

== Production ==
In March 2008, Walt Disney Television International Japan started procuring its own animated shows with their first two debuting at Tokyo International Anime Fair 2008, producing Stitch! with Japanese animation studio Madhouse. Seasons one and two of Stitch! were animated by Madhouse, and season three was animated by Shin-Ei Animation.

At the 2008 Tokyo International Anime Fair, the pilot for the series was showcased to attendees at the Madhouse booth. Information was also shown around Disney's booth, showing the cast of characters who would appear in the anime. Many of the past characters, such as Jumba Jookiba and Pleakley, appear, as well as five villains: Gantu, Dr. Jacques von Hämsterviel, Experiment 625/Reuben, Experiment 627 (in a second season episode), and (in the third season) a new villain named Delia. In addition, three of Jumba's genetic experiments, Experiment 624/Angel, Experiment 221/Sparky and Experiment 010/Felix, also appear in the anime's first season due to their popularity from the American series, although the latter two would appear less frequently in subsequent seasons while more experiments, both returning from the original series and its finale film, and new experiments made for this show, appear.

Stitch! started on TV Tokyo and following affiliates at 7:00 p.m. on October 8, 2008, and had an hour premiere of the first two episodes. Afterward, it aired every Wednesday after at 7:26 p.m. time slot, essentially replacing Bleach.

Similar to Hawaiian culture being featured in the original version, the culture of Okinawa Prefecture and the other Ryukyu Islands are featured. For example, Yuna's karate has replaced Lilo's hula.

Stitch! is influenced by children's manga and originally aimed at young Japanese kids aged 4 to 14 years. Most of the main characters are young children ranging from 8 to 12 years old, including Yuna. However, unlike Lilo & Stitch: The Series, Stitch! contains darker and more mature content.

The series was edited and localized for younger international audiences, especially those in the Western world and the Anglosphere, and a lower TV rating. The series's English dub used an American English-speaking cast that differed from the original cast of the previous films and Lilo & Stitch: The Series.

== Cast ==
With the exception of Rocky McMurray reprising his Lilo & Stitch: The Series and Leroy & Stitch role of Clyde in the English dub of the second season episode "Stitchman Meets Bonnie and Clyde", none of the original English voice cast from the Lilo & Stitch films or Lilo & Stitch: The Series reprised their roles for the English dub of this series.

Character	Voice actor (Japanese)	Voice actor (English)
Stitch	Koichi Yamadera	Ben Diskin
Yuna Kamihara	Motoko Kumai	Eden Riegel
Dr. Jumba Jookiba	Shōzō Iizuka	Jess Winfield
Agent Pleakley	Yūji Mitsuya	Ted Biaselli
Dr. Jacques von Hämsterviel	Hiroshi Yanaka	Kirk Thornton
Gantu	Unshou Ishizuka	Keith Silverstein
Reuben	Kōji Ochiai	Dave Wittenberg
Delia	Romi Park	Mary Elizabeth McGlynn
Gramma	Hisako Kyōda	Gwendoline Yeo
Kijimunaa	Kappei Yamaguchi	Colleen O'Shaughnessey
Mr. Kamihara (Yuna's father)	Kōichi Yamadera	Keith Silverstein
Taro	Tomoe Hanba	Stephanie Sheh
Ted	Hitomi Hase	Laura Bailey
Marvin	Yuki Ishii	Kari Wahlgren
Mr. Honda	Sōryū Konno	Dave Wittenberg
Suzuki	Kanji Suzumori	Kirk Thornton
Penny	Miyako Ito	Meghan Strange
Angel	Madoka Takeda	Kate Higgins
Kenny	Yuka Nishigaki	Derek Stephen Prince
JJ	Yuri Konno	Laura Bailey
Tombo	Yūki Kaji	Dave Wittenberg
Sparky	Wataru Takagi	Steven Jay Blum
Felix	Yasuhiro Mamiya	Steven Jay Blum
Ms. Kawasaki	Ryōko Nagata	Kari Wahlgren
Tachichu	Taiten Kusunoki	Steven Jay Blum
627	Takahiro Yoshino	Ben Diskin
Zero	Masao Komaya	Ben Diskin
Pilolo	Makoto Naruse	Brian Beacock
Nosy	Junichi Endo	Roger Craig Smith
BooGoo	Hitomi Hase	Steven Jay Blum
Sasha	Fumiko Orikasa	Melissa Fahn
Tigerlily	Rica Matsumoto	Laura Bailey
Hiroman	Hiroaki Miura	Sam Riegel
Jessica	Yoko Hikasa	Kate Higgins
Dolores	Yumiko Kobayashi	Colleen O'Shaughnessey
Toriko	Mai Katagari	Ali Hillis
Makiko	Komatsuna Sakato	Laura Bailey
Lilo Pelekai	Sumire Morohoshi (young Lilo); Tomoe Hanba (adult Lilo)	Melissa Fahn (young Lilo); Gwendoline Yeo (adult Lilo)
Ani	Sumire Morohoshi	Melissa Fahn

== Music ==
=== Soundtrack ===
Stitch!: Original Soundtrack

Soundtrack album
- Released: April 28, 2010
- Genre: Soundtrack
- Labels: Walt Disney, Avex

Lilo & Stitch music chronology
Lilo & Stitch Hawaiian Album (2006)	Stitch!: Original Soundtrack (2010)	Lilo & Stitch (Original Motion Picture Soundtrack) (2025)

Stitch!: Original Soundtrack (スティッチ！オリジナル・サウンドトラック, Sutitchi! Orijinaru Saundotorakku) is a collection of opening, insert, and ending songs based on Stitch! It was released on April 28, 2010.

==== Track list ====
1. "Minamikaze to Taiyō" (南風と太陽; "South Wind & Sun") by Mongol800
2. "Rodeo star mate" by The Pillows
3. "SMILE" by Kimaguren
4. "Ichariba Ohana" (イチャリバオハナ; "If We've Met Before, We're Ohana") by Begin
5. "Aoi Arashi" (アオイアラシ; "Blue Storm") by All Japan Goith
6. "TOMODACHI" (Friends) by Glean Piece
7. "HERO" by Kiyotaka Ishikawa
8. "Hitori Janai" (ひとりじゃない; "You Are Not Alone") by Bless4
9. "Number One" by LoversSoul
10. "Kagen no Tsuki" (下弦の月; "Waning Moon") by Chihiro Kamiya
11. "Stitch is Coming" (スティッチ・イズ・カミング, Sutitchi Izu Kamingu) by Bless4
12. "Stitch Eisa" (スティッチ・エイサー, Sutitchi Eisaa) by LoversSoul
13. "Izayoi Yoi" (イザヨイヨイ; "Izayoi Evening") by Begin featuring Kanako Hatoma

=== Theme songs ===
==== Stitch! (Season 1) ====
Opening theme

- "Ichariba Ohana" (イチャリバオハナ; "If We've Met Before, We're Ohana") by Begin

Ending themes

- "Izayoi Yoi" (イザヨイヨイ; "Izayoi Evening") by Begin w/ Kanako Hatoma (ep 1 – 13)
- "Stitch is Coming" by Bless4 (ep 14 – 26)

Insert themes

- "Hitori Janai" (ひとりじゃない; "You Are Not Alone") by Bless4

==== Stitch! ~The Mischievous Alien's Great Adventure~ (Season 2) ====
Opening theme

- "SMILE" by Kimaguren (ep 1 – 10)
- "Rodeo star mate" by The Pillows (ep 11 – 19)
- "Minami Kaze to Taiyou" (南風と太陽; "South Wind & Sun") by Mongol800 (ep 20 – 29)

Ending theme

- "Stitch Eisa" (スティッチ・エイサー, Sutitchi Eisaa) by LoversSoul

Insert Song

- "Waning Moon" by Chihiro Kamiya
- "Number One" by LoversSoul
- "Tomodachi" by Gleam Piece
- "Aoi Arashi" by All Japan Goith
- "Hero" by Ishikawa Kiyotaka

==== Stitch! ~Best Friends Forever~ (Season 3) ====
Opening theme

- "Minna no Yume" (みんなのゆめ; "Everybody's Dream") by Mariko Kojima featuring Chihiro Ozawa

Ending theme

- "Minna Stitch Tomodachi!" (みんなスティッチともだち!; "Everyone Stitch The Friends!") by SYUHEI (Disney Channel Japan Only)

=== International version ===
Stitch! (international version)

Soundtrack album by Thorsten Laewe
- Genre: Soundtrack

The international version features an entirely different score composed by Thorsten Laewe, who released his score on his personal website.

==== Track list ====
All music is composed by Thorsten Laewe.

No.	Title	Length
1.	"The Space Prison"	0:45
2.	"SpaceChase"	1:13
3.	"Stitch Saves the World"	2:58
4.	"Farewell My Friends"	1:53
5.	"The Shoguns Showdown"	2:51
6.	"Going Fishing"	0:47
7.	"Stitch Gets Power"	1:54
8.	"The Shoguns Past"	1:03
9.	"Awaken the Ship"	0:33
10.	"Captain Khan"	0:54
11.	"The Pirate Battle"	0:35
12.	"Bonnie Clyde Steal"	0:29
13.	"Chicago Heist"	1:55
14.	"My Ohana"	0:56
15.	"Stitch Space Attack"	0:44
16.	"The Good Deed Counter"	0:48
17.	"Dinner Without Plans"	1:24
18.	"Main Title Theme Season 3"	1:00
19.	"Main Title Theme Season 1 & 2"	0:30
Total length:		23:12

== Release ==
=== Broadcast ===
The series was shown on Seven Network, 7mate, 7Two, and Disney Channel in Australia, as well as on Disney Channel in India and Southeast Asia before the latter’s closure in 2021. The first two seasons also aired on Toon Disney in Italy, but the anime aired in its entirety on TV3 and TV2 in Malaysia, TV5 in the Philippines, RTÉ Two in Ireland, dubbed in Irish, and on Disney Cinemagic in the United Kingdom between 2010 and 2013.

The first season began airing in English on the Australian Disney Channel on 4 December 2009, and later on Disney Channel Asia on 19 December 2009. It later premiered on Disney Channel Latin America on 2 May 2010, dubbed in Spanish.

The show also aired on Finland's Disney Channel starting 7 June 2010, using the English dubbed version with subtitles in Finnish. It also used to air in other European, African and Middle Eastern countries on Disney Channel, Disney XD, and Disney Cinemagic.

On October 24, 2011, the English dub premiered on Disney XD in the United States, but was removed four days later for unknown reasons, leaving only five episodes aired in the country. However, full episodes are readily accessible on YouTube.

=== Home media ===
The series received several DVD box set releases in Japan.

Season #	DVD/Boxset name	Episodes	Released	Ref
1	Stitch! BOX 1	1 – 13	5 August 2009	
1	Stitch! Kessaku Episode Shu / Sukisuki! Angel	6, 8, 11	5 August 2009	
1	Stitch! BOX 2	14 – 26	7 October 2009	
1	Stitch! Kessaku Episode Shu / Hi No Tama Boya Damacchi	15, 17, 18	7 October 2009	
2	Stitch! ~Itazura Alien no Daibouken~ BOX 1	1 – 15	23 June 2010	
2	Stitch! ~Itazura Alien no Daibouken~ The Best: Lovely Alien	2, 14, 15	23 June 2010	
2	Stitch! ~Itazura Alien no Daibouken~ BOX 2	16 – 30	20 October 2010	
2	Stitch! ~Itazura Alien no Daibouken~ The Best: Stitch Goes to Tokyo Disneyland	3, 9, 26	20 October 2010	
3	Stitch! ~Zutto Saiko no Tomodachi~ BOX 1	1 – 15	17 June 2011	
3	Stitch! ~Zutto Saiko no Tomodachi~ The Best: Stitch goes to New Town	1, 18, 23	17 June 2011	
3	Stitch! ~Zutto Saiko no Tomodachi~ BOX 2	16 – 30	20 July 2011	

=== Video on-demand ===
In Japan and Singapore, the entire series and both post-series specials are available on Disney+. It was previously on Disney Deluxe, which was later rebranded as Disney+ in the former country but ran separately from the main platform. After the Japanese Disney+ merged with the main platform in October 2021, Stitch! was added to the main platform, albeit still restricted to Japan. Disney+ has only the original Japanese version of the series and splits Stitch and the Planet of Sand and Stitch! Perfect Memory into two parts each, each part its own episode; both specials are listed as part of season three.

Despite the geo-blocking, metadata for languages other than Japanese (such as English) exist on the service, including logos, with episodes titles using either their official dub titles or translations of their Japanese titles; episodes that were shortened and merged with other episodes in the international version also use their combined titles for their respective languages. On August 12, 2022, Disney+ added English subtitles to all episodes, marking the first time that the series' original Japanese production was officially subbed, although it remains restricted to Japan and Singapore on the service.

In India, Indonesia, Malaysia, and Thailand, the series's international version is available on Disney+ Hotstar, with the English dub available in all regions, and Hindi, Telugu, Tamil, Indonesian, Malay and Thai dubs available depending on the region.
