= Windblast =

In mining, a windblast is a sudden rush of air or gas due to the collapse of a void.

== Causes ==
Windblast is common in longwall coal mines, especially those whose roof strata are competent, and do not cave immediately behind the roof supports as the face advances. This results in the tendency for a large void to be created behind the roof supports in the goaf (or gob) which collapses when the overlying cantilevered strata can no longer support its own weight. When the collapse occurs, the air or gas occupying the void is displaced by rock, resulting in a pressure wave and windblast that propagates along the roadways (tunnels) of the mine. This may be followed by a "suck back" as the air pressure is equalised with the low pressure created higher up in the goaf.

Windblast can also occur in metalliferous, kimberlite or even evaporite mines, particularly in block caving mines, as happened at the Northparkes mine in NSW, Australia on 25 November 1999, killing 4.

== Effects of windblast ==
The effects of a windblast are not limited to the physical effects of the overpressure wave. The effects of a windblast include:

- The displacement of asphyxiating, toxic and/or potentially explosive gases such as carbon dioxide, carbon monoxide and methane from a coal mine goaf into the working environment
- The mixing of coal dust with air, creating a potentially explosive mixture
- The overpressure wave can throw objects into people, knock people over (and potentially throw people into stationary objects or even into automated machinery), knock miners' helmets off, pepper the flesh with gravel or small rocks, stop or alter the normal ventilation of the mine and move large items of machinery, in some cases violently.

Broken bones and fatalities are not uncommon outcomes from serious windblast events.

== Management of windblast ==
=== Windblast prevention ===
Windblast prevention is centred on not allowing the void to form in the first place. This can be somewhat achieved through careful mine planning. Windblast prevention also relies on monitoring to ensure the void does not form (and stopping production if one does begin to form), and the use of different methods to try to promote caving, such as hydraulic fracturing and the use of explosives.

=== Windblast harm minimisation ===
Harm minimisation seeks to minimise the damage to persons and machinery if a wind blast does occur. This may involve the following:

- The use of PPE (personal protective equipment)
- Blast-activated cut-off switches on machinery and electrical circuits (for example, in the form of a paddle that is activated by the blast)
- The use of overpressure-rated ventilation devices, of sufficient rating that they won't be destroyed by a windblast
- In hard-rock mines, harm minimisation may involve physically separating the cave (the void) from the working area by leaving an adequate thickness of muck-pile, and ensuring no other physical linkages exist between the cave and the working areas
- Providing dedicated leakage paths from the cave to atmosphere.

== Confusion of windblast with outburst ==
Windblast should not be confused with an outburst, which is the sudden and violent ejection of rock and gas from a coal seam and the surrounding strata.
