= Bobs Gannaway =

American screenwriter, producer, and director (born 1965)

- Born: Roberts Burrell Gannaway; Tulsa, Oklahoma, U.S.
- Education: University of Oklahoma
- Occupations: Screenwriter; producer; director; actor
- Years active: 1988–present
- Children: 2 (including Hadley)

Roberts Burrell Gannaway is an American screenwriter, producer, director, and actor. He is currently the showrunner for WondLa on Apple TV+.

== Early life ==
Gannaway was born in Tulsa, Oklahoma. He attended the University of Oklahoma, where he got a cartooning scholarship, and subsequently graduated from the USC School of Cinematic Arts.

== Career ==
Gannaway began working at Walt Disney Feature Animation, later writing for Warner Bros., The Walt Disney Company, and Paramount Pictures, including co‑writing Cats Don't Dance. He developed projects such as an adaptation of the novel Matilda.

At Hanna-Barbera, Gannaway contributed to 2 Stupid Dogs and Secret Squirrel, before joining Disney Television Animation in 1994 as supervising producer of the Emmy‑winning Timon & Pumbaa. He wrote, produced, and directed more than 300 half‑hours, including The Emperor's New School, Lilo & Stitch: The Series, House of Mouse, Mickey Mouse Works, and 101 Dalmatians: The Series. He was the executive producer of Mickey Mouse Clubhouse and developed Jake and the Never Land Pirates.

Gannaway also worked on Disney direct-to-video films, including Mickey's Magical Christmas: Snowed in at the House of Mouse, Mickey's House of Villains, and Stitch! The Movie. He co‑wrote/co‑directed Secret of the Wings with Peggy Holmes, co-wrote The Pirate Fairy, and directed Planes: Fire & Rescue.

Gannaway was the showrunner for Disney+'s Monsters at Work, introducing characters like Tylor Tuskmon and Val Little alongside returning Monsters, Inc. characters; as well as for Apple TV's WondLa.

== Personal life and recognition ==
He lives in Los Angeles, California with his family. He has been nominated for 3 Daytime Emmy Awards and a Humanitas Prize (1998); and he received an Annie Award in 1997.
