= Lilo & Stitch (franchise) =

Disney media franchise

Lilo & Stitch / Stitch
- Above: Lilo & Stitch logo used since the 2002 original film Below: Disney Stitch logo used since 2021, primarily used when only the character Stitch is emphasized
- Created by: Walt Disney Animation Studios; Chris Sanders; Dean DeBlois
- Original work: Lilo & Stitch (2002)
- Owner: The Walt Disney Company (through Disney Enterprises, Inc.)
- Years: 2002–present

Print publications
- Book: Agent Stitch series (2022–present)
- Comics: Stitch & the Samurai (2020); Dynamite Entertainment comics: Lilo & Stitch (2024); Disney Stitch (2025–present); Lilo & Stitch: 626 (2026); The Stitch Book: Top Secret Adventures (2026)
- Comic strips: Comic Zone: Disney's Lilo & Stitch (2002–2006)

Films and television
- Films: Lilo & Stitch (2002); Lilo & Stitch (2025); Lilo & Stitch 2 (2028)
- Short films: The Origin of Stitch (2005); Lilo & Scratch (2026)
- Animated series: Lilo & Stitch: The Series (2003–2006); Stitch! (2008–2011, 2012, 2015); Stitch & Ai (2017)
- Television specials: Stitch and the Planet of Sand (2012); Stitch! Perfect Memory (2015)
- Television shorts: "Stitch Meets High School Musical" (2007); Stitch & Angel's Perfect Summer Day (2026)
- Television film: Leroy & Stitch (2006)
- Direct-to-video: Stitch! The Movie (2003); Lilo & Stitch 2: Stitch Has a Glitch (2005)

Games
- Video games: Disney's Lilo & Stitch (Game Boy Advance; 2002); Disney's Lilo & Stitch: Trouble in Paradise (2002); Disney's Stitch: Experiment 626 (2002); Lilo & Stitch Pinball (2002); Lilo & Stitch 2: Hämsterviel Havoc (2004); Kingdom Hearts II (2005)^{*}; Disney Friends (2007)^{*}; Disney Stitch Jam (2009); Kingdom Hearts Birth by Sleep (2010)^{*}; Motto! Stitch! DS: Rhythm de Rakugaki Daisakusen (2010); Disney Universe (2011)^{*}; Kinect: Disneyland Adventures (2011)^{*}; Disney Magical World (2013)^{*}; Disney Infinity 2.0 (2014)^{*}; Disney Magical World 2 (2015)^{*}; Disney Magic Kingdoms (2016)^{*}^{†}; Kingdom Hearts III (2019)^{*}; Disney Mirrorverse (2022)^{*}^{†}; Disney Dreamlight Valley (2023)^{*}^{†}; Disney Speedstorm (2023)^{*}^{†}

Audio
- Soundtracks: Lilo & Stitch: An Original Walt Disney Records Soundtrack (2002); Lilo & Stitch Island Favorites (2005); Lilo & Stitch Hawaiian Album (2006); Stitch!: Original Soundtrack (2010); Lilo & Stitch (Original Motion Picture Soundtrack) (2025)

Miscellaneous
- Toy: Disney Tsum Tsum^{*}
- Theme park attractions: Stitch's Great Escape! (2004–2018); Stitch Encounter (2006–present) (Note: Named Stitch Live! in Disney Adventure World and Space Chat with Stitch since 2025 in Shanghai Disneyland.); The Enchanted Tiki Room: Stitch Presents Aloha e Komo Mai! (2008–present); Stitch's Supersonic Celebration (2009)
- ^{*} Work where this franchise's characters or settings appeared as part of a crossover.; ^{†} Franchise-related content added to crossover work via update(s).

Lilo & Stitch or Stitch (marketed as Disney Stitch) is an American media franchise created and owned by The Walt Disney Company. The first installment was written and directed by Chris Sanders and Dean DeBlois, and released in 2002. The combined critical and commercial success of the original film, which was a rarity for the company's feature animation studio during the studio's post-Renaissance downturn in the early 2000s, led to two direct-to-video and one television sequel feature films, animated shorts, three animated television series, a live-action/CGI feature film adaptation, several video games, theme park attractions, comics, literature, and various merchandise. The franchise became one of Disney's top ten best-selling franchises, with retail sales reaching $2.6 billion as of 2024 and later earning another $4 billion for the 2025 fiscal year alone. Overall revenue (including the box offices of the two theatrical films) has reached over $7.9 billion, making it one of the highest-grossing media franchises.

The franchise, primarily the original 2002–2006 animated continuity, mainly focuses on the adventures of the titular eccentric and mischievous duo: an orphaned Hawaiian girl named Lilo Pelekai and an artificial extraterrestrial creature originally named Experiment 626, whom she adopts and names Stitch. Stitch was created via genetic engineering by alien mad scientist Dr. Jumba Jookiba to cause chaos and destruction across the galaxy but was rehabilitated by Lilo thanks to ʻohana, the Hawaiian concept of extended family. The duo's ʻohana mainly consist of themselves; Lilo's older sister and legal guardian, Nani Pelekai; Jumba; and Jumba's Earth-loving partner, Agent Wendy Pleakley. Most of the sequel and spin-off material of the franchise also involves many genetic experiments similar to Stitch, whom he treats as his "cousins", Captain Gantu, a giant militaristic alien from the original film who becomes an antagonist to the main ʻohana in later works, and Dr. Jacques von Hämsterviel, Jumba's diminutive former partner-in-crime who desires the experiments he funded the creation of to use them for intergalactic domination. Additionally, the franchise's films and first television series make frequent references to American musician Elvis Presley (of whom Sanders himself is an avid fan), using his music and sometimes his likeness in the films.

The later spin-off material released from 2008 through 2020—the Japanese anime Stitch!, the Chinese animated series Stitch & Ai, and the Japanese manga Stitch & the Samurai—emphasize Stitch by separating him from Lilo and putting him into other regions of Earth (primarily in the countries where these works are produced), replacing her with different humans who take him, along with Jumba and Pleakley, in with their families. The original Japanese version of the anime was produced by an entirely different crew from the original franchise, while the Chinese series was partially produced by American animators; crew members from Lilo & Stitch: The Series worked on both shows, although the anime only involved them in the international edit (which includes the English dub). The two Asian series replace the original voice cast of the four films and the first TV series. Later spin-offs beginning from 2022, including the children's detective book series Agent Stitch and various Lilo & Stitch comic books released by Dynamite Entertainment since 2024, resumed Lilo's involvement as a main character and Stitch's best friend. These works also mostly serve as continuations after only the original film rather than continuations after Leroy & Stitch.

A live-action and computer-animated adaptation of the original film was released in 2025, with Sanders reprising his voice role as Stitch. A sequel to that film is in development, with Sanders writing and directing.

== Films and television ==
=== Overviews ===
==== Films ====
Film	U.S. release date	Director(s)	Screenwriter(s)	Story by	Producer(s)
Original animated continuity
Lilo & Stitch	June 21, 2002	Chris Sanders & Dean DeBlois	Chris Sanders & Dean DeBlois	Chris Sanders (based on an idea by)	Clark Spencer
Stitch! The Movie	August 26, 2003	Tony Craig & Bobs Gannaway	Bobs Gannaway & Jess Winfield	Bobs Gannaway & Jess Winfield	Tony Craig, Bobs Gannaway, & Jess Winfield
Lilo & Stitch 2: Stitch Has a Glitch	August 30, 2005	Tony Leondis & Michael LaBash	Tony Leondis & Michael LaBash and Eddie Guzelian and Alexa Junge		Christopher Chase
The Origin of Stitch	August 30, 2005	Mike Disa & Tony Bancroft	Eddie Guzelian & Michael LaBash	Eddie Guzelian & Michael LaBash	Ben Chambers
Leroy & Stitch	June 23, 2006	Tony Craig & Bobs Gannaway	Bobs Gannaway & Jess Winfield	Bobs Gannaway & Jess Winfield	Igor Khait & Jess Winfield
Lilo & Scratch	November 25, 2026 (with Hexed)	Fawn Veerasunthorn & Malcon Pierce	TBA	TBA	Nathan Curtis
Live-action continuity
Lilo & Stitch	May 23, 2025	Dean Fleischer Camp	Chris Kekaniokalani Bright and Mike Van Waes	Chris Kekaniokalani Bright and Mike Van Waes	Jonathan Eirich & Dan Lin
Lilo & Stitch 2	May 26, 2028	Chris Sanders	Chris Sanders	Chris Sanders	Jonathan Eirich

==== Television series ====
Series	Season	Episodes	Originally released			Country of origin	Production company(ies)
Series	Season	Episodes	First released	Last released	Network	Country of origin	Production company(ies)
Lilo & Stitch: The Series	Pilot film		August 26, 2003		Direct-to-video	United States	Walt Disney Television Animation
Lilo & Stitch: The Series	1	39	September 20, 2003	February 28, 2004	Disney Channel; ABC (ABC Kids)	United States	Walt Disney Television Animation
Lilo & Stitch: The Series	2	26 (28 segments)	November 5, 2004	July 29, 2006	Disney Channel; ABC (ABC Kids)	United States	Walt Disney Television Animation
Lilo & Stitch: The Series	Finale film		June 23, 2006		Disney Channel	United States	Walt Disney Television Animation
Stitch! (Note: Japanese: スティッチ!, Hepburn: Suticchi!)	1 (Note: In this series' native Japan, only the first season is titled Stitch!; internationally, all three seasons carry the singular Stitch! name.)	26 (Note: Episode counts for each of the Stitch! anime's three seasons include their post-season special episodes, which are treated as regular episodes in the international edit and on Disney+ in Japan and Singapore.)	October 8, 2008	June 26, 2009	TV Tokyo	Japan	Madhouse
Stitch!	2 (Note: Titled Stitch! ~The Mischievous Alien's Great Adventure~ (スティッチ! ～いたずらエイリアンの大冒険～, Sutitchi! ~Itazura Eirian no Daibōken~) in its native Japan.)	30 (31 segments)	October 13, 2009	August 8, 2010	TV Asahi	Japan	Madhouse
Stitch!	3 (Note: Titled Stitch! ~Best Friends Forever~ (スティッチ! ～ずっと最高のトモダチ～, Sutitchi! ~Zutto Saikō no Tomodachi~) in its native Japan.)	30	July 6, 2010	July 19, 2011	TV Asahi	Japan	Shin-Ei Animation
Stitch!	Post-series specials (Note: Known collectively as Stitch! New Specials, which features Stitch and the Planet of Sand (スティッチと砂の惑星, Sutitchi to Suna no Wakusei) and Stitch! Perfect Memory (スティッチ！パーフェクト・メモリー, Sutitchi! Pāfekuto Memorī), the latter also called Stitch! A Perfect Memory in English promotional material.)	2 specials	June 16, 2012	August 7, 2015	Disney Channel Japan	Japan	Shin-Ei Animation
Stitch & Ai (Note: Chinese: 安玲与史迪奇; pinyin: Ān líng yǔ shǐ dí qí; lit. 'An Ling and Stitch')	1	13	March 27, 2017	April 6, 2017	CCTV-1; CCTV-14	China	Anhui Xinhua Media; Panimation Hwakai Media

=== Main continuity ===
==== Lilo & Stitch (2002) ====
An extraterrestrial mad scientist named Dr. Jumba Jookiba (voiced by David Ogden Stiers) is put on trial for illegally creating creatures to cause chaos and destruction. His latest experiment is Experiment 626 (Chris Sanders): a little blue alien with four arms, two legs, and antennae who is deceptively strong and indestructible. 626 (pronounced "six-two-six") is sentenced to exile, while Jumba himself is jailed. However, 626 escapes custody, steals a police cruiser ship, and heads to the planet Earth. Jumba gets sent on a mission to retrieve his creation along with a partner on board, self-proclaimed Earth expert Agent Pleakley (Kevin McDonald), who is forced to go along to keep an eye on him.

Masquerading as a dog, 626 is adopted by a little girl named Lilo Pelekai (Daveigh Chase) who is living with her 19-year-old sister Nani (Tia Carrere). Lilo is lonely and a bit of an outcast until she finds a new friend in 626 whom she names "Stitch".

==== Stitch! The Movie (2003) ====
Ex-Captain Gantu (Kevin Michael Richardson) is hired by the evil Dr. Hämsterviel (Jeff Bennett) to retrieve the remaining 625 experiments. Meanwhile, on Earth, Stitch is still not fitting in, but when trouble comes calling through the form of Experiment 221 (Frank Welker), he and Lilo must band together to stop his electrical rampage. Meanwhile, Gantu ends up with a new ally, Experiment 625 (Rob Paulsen), but is displeased by his lazy behavior and love of sandwiches.

==== Lilo & Stitch: The Series (2003–2006) ====
Continuing where Stitch! The Movie left off, Lilo and Stitch are given the task of collecting the rest of Jumba's missing experiments, changing them from bad to good, and finding the one place where they truly belong. Meanwhile, the former Captain Gantu and his reluctant partner, Experiment 625, try to capture the experiments for the imprisoned Dr. Hämsterviel.

Running for a total of 65 episodes over two seasons, The Series ended with the television film Leroy & Stitch.

==== Lilo & Stitch 2: Stitch Has a Glitch (2005) ====
Set at a time between the original film and Stitch! The Movie, Lilo (voiced by Dakota Fanning in this film) and her classmates are preparing for a hula competition where the winner gets to perform at the local May Day festival. Each student is required to create an original dance. While preparing for the competition, Stitch's past comes back to haunt him. It seems that after Stitch was created, Jumba did not get a chance to fully charge Stitch's molecules before he was arrested. At first, this glitch causes Stitch to revert to his old destructive programming, but it will ultimately destroy him if Jumba cannot create a charging pod before Stitch's energy runs out.

===== The Origin of Stitch (2005) =====
In this short film included on the Stitch Has a Glitch DVD, serving as a bridge between it and Stitch! The Movie, Stitch discovers Jumba's computer and is scared to find out what a monster he is, only for Jumba to come and explain how he found family and love when he met Lilo. The other experiments are also hinted at.

==== Leroy & Stitch (2006) ====
After three years, their mission to capture all 624 experiments and repurpose them on Earth has been completed, so Lilo and her family are honored as heroes by the Galactic Alliance. Despite originally turning down their new offered positions to stay with Lilo, Stitch and the crew separate to live out their ambitions. However, after Gantu frees Hämsterviel from his prison, they create a new experiment of their own, Leroy (Chris Sanders). Lilo and Stitch must reunite and unite every single experiment they have to fight Leroy and his army of duplicated clones.

==== Lilo & Scratch (2026) ====
Taking place shortly after the original film, this theatrical short film focuses on Stitch having to look after a cat Lilo found named Scratch, who is secretly a similarly destructive extraterrestrial creature who plots to eat Lilo's pet fish Pudge. The short premiered at the 2026 Annecy International Animation Film Festival and will release in theaters before screenings of Hexed. The short is the first production from Walt Disney Animation Studios for the franchise since the original film. Maia Kealoha reprises her role as Lilo from the live action film, while Chris Sanders returns to voice Stitch.

=== Spin-off releases ===
==== Stitch Meets High School Musical (2007) ====
Stitch and a number of Lilo & Stitch characters play a friendly game of basketball and then dance to "We're All in This Together" from High School Musical. This anime short aired on Disney Channel Japan on June 18, 2007 and was later released internationally on September 23, 2008 on the High School Musical 2: Deluxe Dance Edition 2-disc DVD set.

==== Stitch! (2008–2011, 2012, 2015) ====
The anime series features a Japanese girl named Yuna Kamihara (voiced by Eden Riegel in the English dub) in place of Lilo and is set on a fictional island off the shore of Okinawa instead of Hawaii. The first two seasons were animated and co-produced by the Japanese animation house Madhouse, while the third season and two post-series television specials were animated by Shin-Ei Animation. 86 episodes (including three specials) aired from 2008 to 2011, while two post-series specials aired in 2012 and 2015.

Set years after the events of Leroy & Stitch, the anime sees Stitch (now voiced by Ben Diskin) having left Lilo after she went to college. He ends up on the fictitious Izayoi Island where he meets Yuna, a tomboyish girl who lives with her grandmother (Gwendoline Yeo) and practices karate. Stitch befriends Yuna, Jumba (Lilo & Stitch: The Series screenwriter and executive producer Jess Winfield) and Pleakley (Ted Biaselli) later rejoin Stitch, and the three aliens move in with Yuna's family. In the first two seasons, Stitch tries to do 43 good deeds to appease the Chitama Spiritual Stone, a magical stone that can grant wishes, with Stitch wanting to become the strongest being in the universe. He and Yuna also meet various yōkai, with them befriending Kijimunaa (Colleen O'Shaughnessey), a little yōkai with long red hair who has a powerful sneeze. Meanwhile, Hämsterviel (Kirk Thornton), who is at large along with Gantu (Keith Silverstein) and Experiment 625/Reuben (Dave Wittenberg), wants to defeat Stitch and take his good deeds to gain ultimate power.

The first season sees Stitch doing good deeds while enjoying his new life with Yuna on Izayoi, with them befriending various yōkai. Three of Stitch and Reuben's fellow experiments also make appearances, namely Experiment 221/Sparky, Experiment 010/Felix (both Steve Blum), and Experiment 624/Angel (Kate Higgins), the last of whom becomes a more recurring character compared to Lilo & Stitch: The Series and has—since her last Western appearance in Leroy & Stitch—remained Stitch's girlfriend while also having become a popular singing sensation in the years since.

The second season, titled Stitch! ~The Mischievous Alien's Great Adventure~, sees Stitch continuing to live his life with Yuna and completing his goal of doing good deeds for his wish to be granted. More characters join the cast during this season, including BooGoo (Blum), a purple insect-like alien who becomes the aliens' new pet, Sasha (Melissa Fahn), a transfer student who becomes Yuna's newest friend, and Tigerlily Sakai (Laura Bailey), Yuna's beautiful but mean cousin who bullies her and Stitch. Additionally, more experiments, both originating from Lilo & Stitch: The Series and newly introduced to the franchise, appear from this season onward, with most of them now inexplicably under Hämsterviel's possession. By the end of this season, however, Stitch loses his motivation to have his wish granted, deciding that living with Yuna is better than being the strongest in the universe.

In the third season, titled Stitch! ~Best Friends Forever~, Yuna, Stitch, Tigerlily, Jumba, Pleakley, and BooGoo move to a city called Okinawa New Town. Meanwhile, Hämsterviel partners with an evil alien woman named Delia (Mary Elizabeth McGlynn), who desires to retrieve a power cell within Stitch, eventually making a powerful experiment of her own—Dark End (Roger Craig Smith)—to do so. Lilo (Yeo) also returns in one episode of this season for a brief reunion with Stitch.

==== Stitch & Ai (2017) ====
Taking place in Huangshan in Anhui, this 13-episode Chinese animated series stars Stitch (voiced by Ben Diskin in the English version, reprising his anime role) and a local girl named Wang Ai Ling (Erica Mendez). Produced in English with the partnership of American animators, the series was animated by Anhui Xinhua Media and Panimation Hwakai Media and was broadcast on CCTV-14 with a Mandarin Chinese dub from March 27 to April 6, 2017. The original English version later aired in Southeast Asia in February 2018 and released in the United States on the DisneyNow service on December 1, 2018, streaming on the service until June 2019.

Set after Leroy & Stitch but on a separate timeline from the Stitch! anime, the Chinese series shows Stitch having been captured by a warring alien faction called the Jaboodies who wants to use him as their own destructive genetic experiment, but he escapes when a rival faction also wanting him, the Woolagongs, attacks the ship he was held in. Ending up in the Huangshan mountains, Stitch meets Ai, a spirited girl whose aunt Daiyu (Laura Post) wants to move Ai from her sister Jiejie (Post) and their mountain home to a city. Stitch joins Ai's family as her new "dog", with Jumba (Jess Winfield, also reprising his role from the anime) and Pleakley (Lucien Dodge) also joining them after initially being sent to rescue Stitch. Stitch helps Ai stay in the mountains and she helps him ward off the Jaboodies and the Woolagongs, both of whom desire to make use of a secret metamorphosis ability Jumba programmed in Stitch that turns the experiment into a destructive giant.

==== Stitch & Angel's Perfect Summer Day (2026) ====
In this two-minute animated short, Stitch and Angel enjoy a summer day at the beach, including playing beach volleyball, drinking smoothies, and building a sandcastle. Stitch's chaotic nature mars their enjoyment until he decides to cooperate with Angel on their sandcastle. However, a rising tide threatens to ruin their sandcastle until the two experiments decide destroying the sandcastle is more fun. The short was released on Disney+ and the Disney Kids YouTube channel on June 24, 2026, also known as "624 Day" and "Angel Day" in reference to Angel's codename of Experiment 624, to coincide with "626 Day" or "Stitch Day" (referring to Stitch's codename of Experiment 626) on June 26.

=== Live-action/animated films ===
==== Lilo & Stitch (2025) ====
In October 2018, Walt Disney Pictures announced that a live-action adaptation of Lilo & Stitch was in development, with Jonathan Eirich and Dan Lin announced as producers. In November 2020, Jon M. Chu entered early negotiations to serve as director on the project. Filming was announced to take place in Hawaii. In July 2022, Dean Fleischer Camp signed on to replace Chu as the film's director. Chris Kekaniokalani Bright, a Hawaiian-born-and-based writer whose script Conviction made the 2018 edition of the Black List, and Mike Van Waes wrote the film's script. Filming began by late April/early May 2023 but was suspended in July 2023 due to the 2023 SAG-AFTRA strike.

In August 2024, the film was announced to have a summer 2025 theatrical release. It was released on May 23, 2025.

==== Lilo & Stitch 2 (2028) ====
On June 26, 2025, also known as "626 Day" or "Stitch Day" in reference to Stitch's codename, Disney announced that a sequel is in development. The film will be written and directed by Chris Sanders, the first time since his original animated film that he would contribute to the franchise he created outside of voice acting. Jonathan Eirich will also return as producer. On March 18, 2026, Disney announced that Lilo & Stitch 2 will be released on May 26, 2028, three years and three days after the previous film. At D23: The Ultimate Disney Fan Event 2026, it was revealed that Angel (Experiment 624) will appear in the film.

== Cast and characters ==
List indicators

This section includes characters who have appeared in the franchise. With regards to the non-American productions (i.e. Stitch! and Stitch & Ai), only the English voice cast is listed below; non-English voices will not be listed for characters whose appearance(s) in the work was not made available in English.

- An empty grey cell indicates the character was not in the work.
- ^{C} indicates a cameo role.
- ^{O} indicates an older version of the character.
- ^{U} indicates an uncredited appearance.
- ^{Y} indicates a younger version of the character.
- ^{P} indicates an appearance in onscreen photographs or graphical pictures.
- ^{S} indicates an appearance in silhouette only.

Characters	Main films				Television series			Short films		Video games			Live-action films	
Characters	Lilo & Stitch	Stitch! The Movie	Lilo & Stitch 2: Stitch Has a Glitch	Leroy & Stitch	Lilo & Stitch: The Series	Stitch!	Stitch & Ai	The Origin of Stitch	Lilo & Scratch	Disney's Lilo & Stitch	Lilo & Stitch: Trouble in Paradise	Disney's Stitch: Experiment 626	Lilo & Stitch	Lilo & Stitch 2
Principal characters
Stitch Experiment 626	Chris Sanders	Chris Sanders	Chris Sanders	Chris Sanders	Chris Sanders	Ben Diskin	Ben Diskin	Chris Sanders^{U}	Chris Sanders	Chris Sanders	Chris Sanders	Chris Sanders	Chris Sanders	Chris Sanders
Lilo Pelekai	Daveigh Chase	Daveigh Chase	Dakota Fanning	Daveigh Chase	Daveigh Chase Tara Strong^{O}	Gwendoline Yeo Melissa Fahn^{Y}	Flashbacks	Silent cameo^{P}	Maia Kealoha	Daveigh Chase	Daveigh Chase		Maia Kealoha	Maia Kealoha
Nani Pelekai	Tia Carrere	Tia Carrere	Tia Carrere	Tia Carrere	Tia Carrere Grey DeLisle^{Y}	Flashbacks	Flashbacks	Silent cameo^{P}			Vanessa Marshall		Sydney Elizebeth Agudong	Sydney Elizebeth Agudong
Dr. Jumba Jookiba	David Ogden Stiers	David Ogden Stiers	David Ogden Stiers	David Ogden Stiers	David Ogden Stiers Jason Marsden^{Y}	Jess Winfield	Jess Winfield	David Ogden Stiers^{U}			David Ogden Stiers	David Ogden Stiers	Zach Galifianakis	TBA
Agent Wendy Pleakley (Note: Given name changed to "Wendell" in the 2025 film.)	Kevin McDonald	Kevin McDonald	Kevin McDonald	Kevin McDonald	Kevin McDonald Tommy Widmer^{Y}	Ted Biaselli (Note: Except for Stitch! Perfect Memory; Pleakley's English voice actor in that special is unknown, as the special used the original Japanese credits for all regions.)	Lucien Dodge	Silent cameo^{P}			Kevin McDonald		Billy Magnussen	Billy Magnussen
David Kawena	Jason Scott Lee	Dee Bradley Baker	Jason Scott Lee	Silent cameo	Dee Bradley Baker			Silent cameo^{P}			Dee Bradley Baker		Kaipo Dudoit	Kaipo Dudoit
Mertle Edmonds	Miranda Paige Walls	Liliana Mumy	Liliana Mumy	Liliana Mumy	Liliana Mumy						Miranda Paige Walls		Emery Ho‘okano-Briel	TBA
Cobra Bubbles	Ving Rhames	Ving Rhames		Ving Rhames^{C}	Kevin Michael Richardson			Richard Epcar^{U}			Terrence C. Carson		Courtney B. Vance	Courtney B. Vance
Captain Gantu	Kevin Michael Richardson	Kevin Michael Richardson		Kevin Michael Richardson	Kevin Michael Richardson	Keith Silverstein	Richard Epcar^{U}				Kevin Michael Richardson	Kevin Michael Richardson		
Grand Councilwoman	Zoe Caldwell	Zoe Caldwell		Zoe Caldwell	Zoe Caldwell	Mary Elizabeth McGlynn	Laura Post			Silent cameo		Deleted role (Note: Zoe Caldwell was listed as a voice talent in the game's credits, having provided the Councilwoman's voice. The character and Caldwell's lines would have been used in the game's final cutscene, but they were ultimately cut from the final release.)	Hannah Waddingham	TBA
Dr. Jacques von Hämsterviel	Silent cameo^{S}	Jeff Bennett		Jeff Bennett	Jeff Bennett	Kirk Thornton	Silent cameo							
Reuben Experiment 625		Rob Paulsen		Rob Paulsen	Rob Paulsen	Dave Wittenberg		Silent cameo^{P}					Silent cameo^{P}	
Angel Experiment 624				Tara Strong	Tara Strong	Kate Higgins		Silent cameo^{P}					Silent cameo^{P}	TBA
Supporting human characters
Moses Puloki Kumu / Kumu Hula	Kunewa Mook	Kunewa Mook	Kunewa Mook		Kunewa Mook								Brutus Labenz	
Elena (Note: The 2025 film does not identify any of Mertle's friends by name; the actors portraying each of Mertle's friends are respectively credited as "Mertle's Friend #1", "#2", and "#3".)	Unknown	Jillian Henry	Jillian Henry	Jillian Henry	Jillian Henry								Elle Hipa Arianna Jordan Ignacio Acidera Aubrey Rose Madarang	
Teresa (Note: Named "Aleka" in Lilo & Stitch 2: Stitch Has a Glitch; Elena, Teresa, and Yuki all received different names in the film, but only Teresa's differing name was revealed.)	Unknown	Kali Whitehurst	Holliston Coleman	Kali Whitehurst	Kali Whitehurst								Elle Hipa Arianna Jordan Ignacio Acidera Aubrey Rose Madarang	
Yuki	Unknown	Lili Ishida	Unknown (Note: Emily Osment was credited an additional voice for the film alongside Jillian Henry and Holliston Coleman, but it's not confirmed if she voiced Yuki.)	Lili Ishida	Lili Ishida								Elle Hipa Arianna Jordan Ignacio Acidera Aubrey Rose Madarang	
Mrs. Lynne Hasagawa	Amy Hill			Silent cameo	Amy Hill									
Ice Cream Man (Note: Credited as "Big Hawaiian Dude" in the 2025 film, who eats Hawaiian shave ice instead of ice cream.)	Character is mute	Character is mute	Character is mute	Character is mute	Frank Welker (Note: Brief scenes only; character remains mute otherwise.)	Character is mute	Character is mute				Character is mute		David H. K. Bell	
Yuna Kamihara						Eden Riegel								
Wang Ai Ling							Erica Mendez							
Tūtū													Amy Hill	Amy Hill
Mrs. Kekoa													Tia Carrere	Tia Carrere
Genetic experiments (other than main trio)
Shrink Experiment 001				Silent cameo		Keith Silverstein (Note: Third season only; the character is unvoiced in the second season.)								
Doubledip Experiment 002				Character is mute	Character is mute	Silent cameo (Note: Character only appears in a certain intro segment (which was used for the English dub's season two end credits) and one of the second season's "Kung Fu Dragon Pleak Lee" segments.)		Silent cameo^{P}						
Gigi Experiment 007 / Yapper				Tress MacNeille	Tress MacNeille									
Felix Experiment 010 / Oscar				Tress MacNeille	Tress MacNeille	Steve Blum		Silent cameo^{P}						
Slick Experiment 020				Jeff Bennett	Jeff Bennett	No English voice (Note: Character only appears in one of the second season's "Kung Fu Dragon Pleak Lee" segments, which were not dubbed in English.)		Silent cameo^{P}						
Hertz Donut Experiment 022						Ben Diskin^{U}								
Topper Experiment 025				Unknown	Unknown	Silent cameo		Silent cameo^{P}						
Checkers Experiment 029				Character is mute	Character is mute	Dave Wittenberg		Silent cameo^{P}						
Fibber Experiment 032				Jeff Bennett	Jeff Bennett			Silent cameo^{P}						
Hammerface Experiment 033 / Hammerhead				Jeff Bennett	Jeff Bennett	Steve Blum		Silent cameo^{P}						
Backhoe Experiment 040				Character is mute	Character is mute			Silent cameo^{P}						
Fudgy Experiment 054				Rob Paulsen	Rob Paulsen	Dave Wittenberg								
Frenchfry Experiment 062				Rob Paulsen	Rob Paulsen	Dave Wittenberg		Silent cameo^{P}						
Welko Experiment 074						Stephanie Sheh								
Skip Experiment 089				Jeff Bennett	Jeff Bennett			Silent cameo^{P}						
Squeak Experiment 110 / Squeaky				Rob Paulsen	Rob Paulsen	Roger Craig Smith		Silent cameo^{P}						
Toons Experiment 112						Unknown^{U}								
Shoe Experiment 113				Character is mute	Character is mute	Silent cameo (Note: Character only appears in a certain intro segment, which was reused for the English dub's season two end credits.)								
Snafu Experiment 120				Frank Welker	Frank Welker	Silent cameo (Note: Character only appears in a certain intro segment.)								
Dorkifier Experiment 122						Unknown^{U}								
Carmen Experiment 123				Character is mute		Kari Wahlgren								
Bugby Experiment 128				Character is mute	Character is mute	Silent cameo								
PJ Experiment 133				Jeff Bennett	Jeff Bennett	Roger Craig Smith								
Bragg Experiment 145 / Flute (Note: The character's name is "Bragg" in Japanese and "Flute" in the English dub of Stitch!.)						Ben Diskin								
Bonnie Experiment 149				Tress MacNeille	Tress MacNeille	Mary Elizabeth McGlynn								
Clyde Experiment 150				Rocky McMurray	Rocky McMurray	Rocky McMurray								
Babyfier Experiment 151				Tara Strong	Tara Strong	Laura Bailey								
Finder Experiment 158				Frank Welker	Frank Welker									
Clip Experiment 177				Tress MacNeille	Tress MacNeille	Michelle Ruff								
Nosy Experiment 199				Bobcat Goldthwait	Bobcat Goldthwait	Roger Craig Smith								
Nosox Experiment 204				Character is mute	Character is mute	Ben Diskin								
Retro Experiment 210				Frank Welker	Frank Welker	Dave Wittenberg								
Pix Experiment 214				Character is mute	Character is mute	Ted Biaselli								
Sparky Experiment 221		Frank Welker		Frank Welker	Frank Welker	Steve Blum		Silent cameo^{P}						
Poxy Experiment 222					Frank Welker	Silent cameo								
Glitch Experiment 223				Frank Welker	Frank Welker									
Melty Experiment 228				Frank Welker	Frank Welker	Silent cameo								
Shush Experiment 234				Character only shushes	Silent cameo									
Belle Experiment 248				Tara Strong	Tara Strong									
Link Experiment 251				Unknown	Unknown	Keith Silverstein		Silent cameo^{P}						
Mr. Stenchy Experiment 254				Frank Welker	Frank Welker	Kari Wahlgren		Silent cameo^{P}						
Mrs. Sickly Experiment 255						Michelle Ruff								
Sample Experiment 258				Character only plays back recorded sounds	Character only plays back recorded sounds	Dave Wittenberg		Silent cameo^{P}						
Ace Experiment 262				Character is mute	Character only coughs	Troy Baker		Silent cameo^{P}						
Wishy-Washy Experiment 267				Rob Paulsen	Rob Paulsen	Derek Stephen Prince (Note: Steve Prince was credited as Derek Stephen Prince until 2024.) (Note: Season two episode "We Wishy You a Washy Christmas") Roger Craig Smith (Note: Season three episode "Stitch Goes to Wishlanda")		Silent cameo^{P}						
Wormhole Experiment 272						Dave Wittenberg								
Tickle-Tummy Experiment 275					Tress MacNeille	Stephanie Sheh		Silent cameo^{P}						
Remmy Experiment 276				Jeff Bennett	Jeff Bennett	Travis Willingham		Silent cameo^{P}						
Snooty Experiment 277				Dee Bradley Baker	Dee Bradley Baker									
Lax Experiment 285				Rob Paulsen	Rob Paulsen			Silent cameo^{P}						
Shortstuff Experiment 297				Nancy Cartwright	Nancy Cartwright	Cameo appearance (Note: In the Japanese original, he physically appears for a brief scene at the end of "We Wishy You a Washy Christmas". In the English dub of that episode, that scene is cut, and he only appears as a graphical image on a screen.)		Silent cameo^{P}						
Spooky Experiment 300				Frank Welker (Note: Spooky also disguised himself as Lilo Pelekai (voiced by Daveigh Chase), Cobra Bubbles (voiced by Ving Rhames and Kevin Michael Richardson), Pleakley's mother (voiced by Scott Thompson), and Jumba's ex-wife (voiced by Gigi Bermingham).)	Frank Welker	Unknown^{U} (Note: Spooky's anime English dub voice was not credited. However, he disguised himself as Pleakley's mother (voiced by Ben Diskin), Jumba's ex-wife (voiced by Mary Elizabeth McGlynn), and Angel (voiced by Kate Higgins).)		Silent cameo^{P}						
Amnesio Experiment 303				Tress MacNeille	Tress MacNeille	Travis Willingham								
Morpholomew Experiment 316				Dee Bradley Baker	Dee Bradley Baker	Dave Wittenberg								
Spike Experiment 319				Frank Welker	Frank Welker	Keith Silverstein		Silent cameo^{P}						
Heckler Experiment 322				Character is mute	Will Sasso	Silent cameo		Silent cameo^{P}						
Hunkahunka Experiment 323				Dee Bradley Baker	Dee Bradley Baker	Mary Elizabeth McGlynn								
Dupe Experiment 344				Frank Welker	Frank Welker	Keith Silverstein		Silent cameo^{P}						
Elastico Experiment 345				Jeff Bennett	Jeff Bennett	Wally Wingert		Silent cameo^{P}						
Swapper Experiment 355				Frank Welker	Frank Welker	Ted Biaselli		Silent cameo^{P}						
Drowsy Experiment 360				Dee Bradley Baker	Dee Bradley Baker			Silent cameo^{P}						
Phantasmo Experiment 375				Nancy Cartwright	Nancy Cartwright	No English voice		Silent cameo^{P}						
Swirly Experiment 383				Character is mute	Character is mute	No English voice (Note: This character's only episode where he makes a speaking appearance was not dubbed in English. He also appears in another episode that was dubbed to English and in the special Stitch and the Planet of Sand, both as silent cameos.)		Silent cameo^{P}						
Spats Experiment 397				Character is mute	Character is mute									
Yin Experiment 501				Frank Welker	Frank Welker	No English voice (Note: Character only appears in a certain intro segment (which was used for the English dub's season two end credits), one of the second season's "Kung Fu Dragon Pleak Lee" segments, and as a silent cameo in the special Stitch and the Planet of Sand.)		Silent cameo^{P}						
Yang Experiment 502				Frank Welker	Frank Welker	Silent cameo (Note: As a graphical image in one episode and in a brief scene in the special Stitch and the Planet of Sand.)								
Ploot Experiment 505				Frank Welker	Frank Welker	Steve Blum (Note: Large form) Kari Wahlgren (Note: Small form)								
Sprout Experiment 509				Frank Welker	Frank Welker	Steve Blum (Note: Small and large forms in season two episode "Son of Sprout", large form only in season three episode "Sprout 2.0") Mary Elizabeth McGlynn (Note: Small form in season three episode "Sprout 2.0")								
Richter Experiment 513		Experiment pod		Tress MacNeille	Tress MacNeille									
Deforestator Experiment 515				Unknown	Unknown	Unknown		Silent cameo^{P}						
Cannonball Experiment 520				Tress MacNeille	Tress MacNeille	Silent cameo		Silent cameo^{P}						
Wrapper Experiment 521				Character is mute	Character is mute	Unknown^{U}		Silent cameo^{P}						
Slushy Experiment 523				Frank Welker	Frank Welker	Steve Blum (Note: Season three episode "Stitch Ahoy!")								
Digger Experiment 529		Character is mute		Character is mute	Character is mute									
Phoon Experiment 540				Grey DeLisle	Grey DeLisle	Unknown^{U}		Silent cameo^{P}						
Thresher Experiment 544				Character is mute	Character is mute	Patrick Seitz		Silent cameo^{P}						
Tank Experiment 586				Frank Welker	Frank Welker			Silent cameo^{P}						
Woops Experiment 600				Rob Paulsen	Rob Paulsen	Silent cameo		Silent cameo^{P}						
Kixx Experiment 601				Frank Welker	Frank Welker	Steve Blum		Silent cameo^{P}						
Sinker Experiment 602				Character is mute	Character is mute	Ben Diskin		Silent cameo^{P}						
Houdini Experiment 604				Rob Paulsen	Rob Paulsen	Keith Silverstein		Silent cameo^{P}						
Holio Experiment 606				Character is mute	Character is mute			Silent cameo^{P}						
Slugger Experiment 608				Unknown	Unknown	Unknown								
Heat Experiment 609				Character is mute	Character is mute	Travis Willingham (Note: Character erroneously referred to as Experiment 619, Splodyhead (misspelled in end credits as "Splodeyhead"), in the English dub of "Swapper 2.0".)		Silent cameo^{P}						
Witch Experiment 610						Mary Elizabeth McGlynn								
Yaarp Experiment 613				Character only makes honks	Character only makes honks	(Note: Character only appears in certain intro segments (one of which was used for the English dub's season two end credits), one of the second season's "Kung Fu Dragon Pleak Lee" segments, and as a silent cameo in the special Stitch and the Planet of Sand.)		Silent cameo^{P}						
Plasmoid Experiment 617				Character is mute	Character is mute	Unknown		Silent cameo^{P}						
Splodyhead Experiment 619 / Splody				Frank Welker	Frank Welker	Unknown		Silent cameo^{P}						
Chopsuey Experiment 621												Frank Welker		
Experiment 627		Mentioned		Mentioned	Chris Sanders	Ben Diskin		Silent cameo^{P}					Silent cameo^{P}	
Leroy Experiment 629				Chris Sanders										

== Crew and details ==
Crew/detail	Animated films				Television series			Short films		Live-action films	
Crew/detail	Lilo & Stitch	Stitch! The Movie	Lilo & Stitch 2: Stitch Has a Glitch	Leroy & Stitch	Lilo & Stitch: The Series	Stitch!	Stitch & Ai	The Origin of Stitch	Lilo & Scratch	Lilo & Stitch	Lilo & Stitch 2
Crew/detail	2002	2003	2005	2006	2003–2006	2008–2011, 2012, 2015	2017	2005	2026	2025	2028
Director(s)	Chris Sanders; Dean DeBlois	Tony Craig; Bobs Gannaway	Michael LaBash; Tony Leondis	Tony Craig; Bobs Gannaway	Victor Cook; Don MacKinnon (season 1); Rob LaDuca (season 2); Tony Craig ("Spike" and "Shoe")	Masami Hata (seasons 1 and 2); Tetsuo Yasumi (season 3)	Tony Craig; Marc Handler (voices)	Mike Disa; Tony Bancroft (co-director)	Fawn Veerasunthorn; Malcon Pierce	Dean Fleischer Camp	Chris Sanders
Producer(s)	Clark Spencer	Tony Craig; Jess Winfield; Bobs Gannaway	Christopher Chase	Igor Khait; Jess Winfield	Jess Winfield; Tony Craig; Bobs Gannaway (all executive producers)	Yasuteru Iwase (season 1); Michiyo Hayashi (season 2); Yoshiie Ayugai (seasons 2 and 3); Takahiro Kishimoto (season 2); Satoshi Kubo (season 3); Matsuhisa Tomoharu (season 3)	Cao Jie; Wu Wensheng; Wang Gang (exec.); Pei Duo (exec.); Tian Tian (exec.); Tony Craig (exec.); Marc Handler (exec.)	Ben Chambers	Nathan Curtis	Jonathan Eirich; Dan Lin	Jonathan Eirich
Writer(s)	Chris Sanders; Dean DeBlois	Bobs Gannaway; Jess Winfield	Michael LaBash; Tony Leondis; Eddie Guzelian; Alexa Junge	Bobs Gannaway; Jess Winfield	List of episode writers: Thomas D. Hart; Henry Gilroy; Kevin D. Campbell; Madellaine Paxson; Jim Peronto; Catherine Lieuwen; Brian Swenlin; John Wray; Laura McCreary; Kenneth Koonce; Robert Martin; Chad F. Rogers; Jan Strnad; Heather Lombard; Evan Gore; John Behnka; Rob Humphrey; David Warick; Amy Debartolomeis; Brandon Sawyer; Mark Drop; Jess Winfield	Yūko Kakihara (seasons 1 and 2); Shōji Yonemura (season 1); Ayako Katō (season 2); Mio Aiuchi (season 3)	Marc Handler	Eddie Guzelian; Michael LaBash	TBA	Chris Kekaniokalani Bright; Mike Van Waes	Chris Sanders
Composer(s)	Alan Silvestri	Michael Tavera; Alan Silvestri (themes)	Joel McNeely	J. A. C. Redford; Alan Silvestri (themes)	Michael Tavera	Yoshihisa Suzuki (seasons 1 and 2); Kōtarō Nakagawa (season 3); Thorsten Laewe (international edit, all seasons)	Michael Tavera; Stephen James Taylor	Christopher Tin	Haim Mazar	Dan Romer; Alan Silvestri (themes)	TBA
Editor(s)	Darren T. Holmes	Tony Mizgalski	William J. Caparella	Tony Mizgalski	N/A	N/A	N/A	Robert Cole	TBA	Adam Gerstel; Phillip J. Bartell	TBA
Production company(ies)	Disney Feature Animation Florida	Walt Disney Television Animation	Disneytoon Studios; Disney Animation Australia	Walt Disney Television Animation	Walt Disney Television Animation	Madhouse (seasons 1 and 2); Shin-Ei Animation (season 3 and post-series specials)	Anhui Xinhua Media; Panimation Hwakai Media	Toonacious Family Entertainment	Walt Disney Animation Studios	Walt Disney Pictures; Rideback	Walt Disney Pictures
Distributor	Buena Vista Pictures Distribution	Walt Disney Studios Home Entertainment	Walt Disney Studios Home Entertainment	Buena Vista Television; Walt Disney Studios Home Entertainment	N/A	N/A	N/A	Walt Disney Studios Home Entertainment	Walt Disney Studios Motion Pictures	Walt Disney Studios Motion Pictures	Walt Disney Studios Motion Pictures

== Comics ==
=== Comic Zone: Lilo & Stitch ===
From 2002 to 2006, Disney Adventures released a number of comic strip tie-ins to the franchise. These include prequel comics set before the original film (which include the first appearances of later major character Experiment 625/Reuben, who has a teal coloration in these comics), additional comics set around the time of the film, comics set during the events of Lilo & Stitch: The Series, comics set around the time of Lilo & Stitch 2: Stitch Has a Glitch, and comics set during the events of Leroy & Stitch. On March 7, 2006, Disney Press published a collection of Lilo & Stitch comic strips that were originally published from 2002 to 2005 as Comic Zone, Volume 1: Disney's Lilo & Stitch, the first of four volumes compiling various strips that featured in the "Comic Zone" section of Disney Adventures.

=== Stitch & the Samurai (2020) ===
- Stitch & the Samurai

殿さまとスティッチ (Tono-sama to Stitch)
- Created by: Hiroto Wada
- Manga
- Written by: Hiroto Wada
- Published by: Kodansha
- English publisher: Tokyopop
- Magazine: Comic Days (website)
- Original run: January 13, 2020 – December 28, 2020
- Volumes: 3 tankōbon

Stitch & the Samurai, known in Japan as Tono & Stitch (殿さまとスティッチ, Tono-sama to Stitch; lit. The Lord and Stitch), is a manga written and illustrated by Hiroto Wada. It was first digitally published on Kodansha's website Comic Days from January 13 to December 28, 2020. It takes place in an alternate universe where Stitch crash lands in Japan during the Sengoku period and gets taken in by a warlord named Meison Yamato (大和命尊, Yamato Meison), who finds the "blue tanuki" to be cute. Throughout 2021, an official English translation of the manga's three tankōbon were published by Tokyopop.

The manga's art style is a combination of hyper-realistically drawn humans and environments as featured in other historical manga with the cartoonish design of Stitch and related characters and elements maintained from past franchise entries, with short animations added on some panels. Aside from taking place in Earth's past instead of the modern day, the manga also deviates from past franchise entries by having Stitch's human companion be an adult male rather than a young girl.

=== Dynamite Entertainment comics ===
On October 9, 2023, Dynamite Entertainment announced that a spinoff comic written by Greg Pak with art by Giulia Giacomino would be released in stores starting January 2024. The publisher's first comic series based on the franchise, titled as Lilo & Stitch, is a direct sequel to the 2002 film. The first arc, lasting four issues, has the title duo going on a world tour to escape giant alien robots who are going after Stitch for his DNA. The second arc, also lasting four issues, sees Lilo being assigned by the United Galactic Federation to tame alien monsters (not Jumba's experiments, who are excised from this continuity apart from Stitch himself) based on her prior success with Stitch. The first issue was published on January 31, 2024, and the eighth and final issue was published on December 18, 2024.

Dynamite's second comic series, titled as Stitch, began in 2025 focusing more on the main alien characters of Jumba, Pleakley, and Stitch. This series is written by Connor Ratliff and James III, and illustrated by Gerta Xella, replacing Pak and Giacomino. The comics sees Jumba having joined the Evil Genius Group/Syndicate (E.G.G.S.) since his removal from the Evil Genius Organization (E.G.O.). (Note: As depicted in the Lilo & Stitch: The Series episode "Ace") Jumba creates various new evil inventions to prove his villainy and maintain his membership only for mishaps to happen, usually due to Stitch's mischief. The first issue was published on August 27, 2025.

== Literature ==
=== Agent Stitch (2022–present) ===
Agent Stitch
- Agent Stitch: A Study in Slime (2022); Agent Stitch: The Trouble with Toothoids (2023); Agent Stitch: The Menace at the Mall (2024); Agent Stitch: The M-Files: Rise of the Mansquito (2025); Agent Stitch: A Case of Double Trouble! (2026)
- Author: Steve Behling
- Illustrator: Arianna Rea
- Country: United States
- Language: English
- Genre: Children's literature; Science fiction; Detective fiction
- Publisher: Disney Press; Random House (co-publisher for book 4)
- Published: August 16, 2022 (A Study in Slime); May 30, 2023 (The Trouble with Toothoids); May 21, 2024 (The Menace at the Mall); June 26, 2025 (The M-Files: Rise of the Mansquito); January 6, 2026 (A Case of Double Trouble!)
- Media type: Print (hardcover [books 1 to 3] and paperback [book 4]) and digital (except The M-Files); Audiobook (The M-Files only)

Agent Stitch is a children's book series written by American author Steve Behling and illustrated by Italian artist Arianna Rea. It is the first major Western-produced work in the franchise since Leroy & Stitch (2006). The book series takes place on an alternate timeline after the original film, with Stitch becoming a detective for the United Galactic Federation as part of the Galactic Detective Agency to investigate extraterrestrial-related mysteries happening in various Earth cities. The first book, A Study in Slime, is set in Paris and was published on August 16, 2022. The second book, The Trouble with Toothoids, is set in New York City and was published on May 30, 2023. The third book, The Menace at the Mall, is set in Seoul and was published on May 21, 2024. An Audible-exclusive audiobook focusing on Pleakley and taking place in West Virginia, The M-Files: Rise of the Mansquito, was released on June 26 ("Stitch Day" or "626 Day"), 2025. The fourth book, A Case of Double Trouble!, was published on January 6, 2026.

== Video games ==
=== Disney's Lilo & Stitch (Game Boy Advance; 2002) ===
Disney's Lilo & Stitch is a 2002 side-scrolling shoot 'em up platform video game based on the original film that was developed by Digital Eclipse for the Game Boy Advance.

=== Disney's Lilo & Stitch: Trouble in Paradise (2002) ===
Disney's Lilo & Stitch: Trouble in Paradise (titled simply Disney's Lilo & Stitch on the American release of the PlayStation version) is a platform video game developed by Blitz Games for PlayStation and Microsoft Windows that was released on June 14, 2002.

=== Disney's Stitch: Experiment 626 (2002) ===
Disney's Stitch: Experiment 626 is a platform game for the PlayStation 2 on June 19, 2002, and serves as a prequel to the original film Lilo & Stitch, although it was retconned from the franchise's chronology by Lilo & Stitch 2: Stitch Has a Glitch.

=== Lilo & Stitch: Hawaiian Adventure (2002) ===
Disney's Lilo & Stitch: Hawaiian Adventure (released in some countries as Disney's Lilo & Stitch: Hawaiian Discovery) is a video game developed by Gorilla Systems Corporation and published by Disney Interactive on June 22, 2002, consisting of various minigames, similar to Disney's Activity Center series. AllGame rated 3/5 stars, writing: "Less like an adventure game and more like a series of arcade games, there's enough entertainment on hand to get to the three-game finale".

=== Lilo & Stitch Pinball (2002) ===
Disney's Lilo & Stitch Pinball is a pinball video game developed by Buzz Monkey Software and published by Disney Interactive for Microsoft Windows. It was released on October 8, 2002.

=== Lilo & Stitch 2: Hämsterviel Havoc (2004) ===
Lilo & Stitch 2: Hämsterviel Havoc

Aggregate scores
Aggregator	Score
GameRankings	71.67%
Metacritic	66/100

Review scores
Publication	Score
GameZone	7.5/10
Nintendo Power	3/5

Disney's Lilo & Stitch 2: Hämsterviel Havoc (titled simply Disney's Lilo & Stitch 2 in Europe and Disney's Lilo and Stitch in Japan) is an action-platform game developed by Climax Studios and published by Disney Interactive Studios for Game Boy Advance on October 12, 2004. Hämsterviel Havoc is the sole tie-in game for Lilo & Stitch: The Series and a standalone sequel to the Lilo & Stitch game released on the same platform in 2002. While the game is primarily a platform game, the player has the chance to play as other characters and vehicle segments. The game was met with average to mixed reception, as GameRankings gave it 71.67% based on 6 reviews, while Metacritic gave it 66 out of 100 based on 4 reviews.

=== Disney Stitch Jam (2009) ===
Cover of Disney Stitch Jam for Nintendo DS.

Disney Stitch Jam, known in Japan as Stitch! DS: Ohana to Rhythm de Daibouken (スティッチ！DS オハナとリズムで大冒険(だいぼうけん); Stitch! DS: A Great Adventure of Ohana and Rhythm), is a rhythm video game developed by Cattle Call and published by Disney Interactive Studios. The first video game based on the Stitch! anime series, it was released in Japan on December 3, 2009, in North America on March 23, 2010, and in Europe on March 26. Different from past Lilo & Stitch adaptations, Disney Stitch Jam has players taking control of Stitch and some of his cousins in a variety of missions set in space, out on the seas, and in a variety of areas by touching musical notes and exclamation marks. In the game's story, Angel (X-624) gets kidnapped by Gantu and Hämsterviel, and Stitch has to rescue her by traveling into ten worlds. Stitch is the main playable character, while Angel, Reuben (X-625) and Felix (X-010) are unlockable.

NGamer gave the game a review score of 44% in their May 2010 issue. Common Sense Media's Chad Sapieha gave the game 4 out of 5 stars, calling the gameplay "polished and fun", and praising the game's visuals and sound, but criticizing the game's short length. On release week, Famitsu scored the game a 28 out of 40 across all four reviews.

=== Motto! Stitch! DS: Rhythm de Rakugaki Daisakusen (2010) ===
Cover of Motto! Stitch! DS: Rhythm de Rakugaki Daisakusen for Nintendo DS.

Motto! Stitch! DS: Rhythm de Rakugaki Daisakusen ♪ (もっと！スティッチ！DS リズムでラクガキ大作戦♪; lit. More! Stitch! DS: Great Mission to Doodle in Rhythm), is a rhythm video game and a sequel to Disney Stitch Jam. It was developed by Cattle Call (the developer of the first game) and published by Disney Interactive Studios. Like the first game, it is also based on the Stitch! anime series, although this game is based on the show's third season, Stitch! ~Best Friends Forever~. It was released in Japan on November 18, 2010. This game was not released in North America or Europe.

This game has the same gameplay as its prequel, Disney Stitch Jam, and has more new features, characters, and experiments. This game is a modified engine of its prequel. Players can enjoy the rhythmic action of Stitch, who has a magic microphone that can draw his drawings on the air for decorations and traveling (which resembles and is a parody of Doraemon's secret tool, "Air Crayon"). Players can also dress up characters like Stitch and Angel. On release week, Famitsu scored the game a 30 out of 40 across all four reviews.

=== Bomberman: Disney Stitch Edition (2010) ===
Bomberman: Disney Stitch Edition (ディズニー スティッチ ボンバーマン; lit. Disney Stitch Bomberman) is a spin-off of the Bomberman franchise for the i-mode mobile internet platform developed by Hudson Soft and distributed by D2 Communications. Based on Stitch!, it was released for free under the DoCo DeMo Game banner in 2010 exclusively in Japan.

=== Other appearances ===
- A 2004 EyeToy party game called Disney Move includes a Lilo & Stitch-themed minigame.
- The franchise has been used in the Kingdom Hearts series:
  - In Kingdom Hearts II (2005) and III (2019), Stitch may be summoned alongside Sora to aid him in battles.
  - Kingdom Hearts Birth by Sleep (2010) features characters and the outer space environment from the franchise.
- In Disney Friends (2007), players can voice and touch to control the actions and emotional behaviors of the game's characters, which includes Stitch.
- In Disney Universe (2011), Stitch costumes are available in the game.
- Stitch appears in the Tomorrowland area of Disneyland in Kinect: Disneyland Adventures (2011) as a meet-and-greet character, and like other characters in the game, he gives the player character quests to complete.
- Lilo & Stitch is referenced in the Disney Infinity series (2013–2016):
  - In the first game (2013), two Lilo & Stitch-themed power discs were released in which players can use Stitch's plasma blasters and the "Hangin' Ten Stitch with Surfboard", a hoverboard with a miniature Stitch figure in front.
  - In Disney Infinity 2.0 (2014), Stitch is a playable character, while the Lilo & Stitch franchise is tied into a Toy Box Expansion Game; a tower defense titled Stitch's Tropical Rescue, which features Agent Pleakley in cutscenes and voice-over. Several in-game toys related to the franchise were also added to the game series. He is part of the non-Marvel 2.0 Edition Toy Box starter pack, alongside Merida from Pixar's Brave. As with other playable characters in the series, Stitch can also be used in Disney Infinity 3.0 (2015).
- Both title characters of the franchise appear in the Nintendo 3DS life simulation game Disney Magical World (2013) and its sequel (2015), with the latter game also featuring Jumba, Pleakley, and a world based on the franchise.
- In an April 2017 update to Disney Crossy Road, Lilo & Stitch became a playable world. Over fifteen original film characters are featured in the game.
- Stitch and Gantu appear in Disney Twisted-Wonderland in a side event titled "Stitch's Tropical Turbulence" ("Lost in the Book with Stitch" in Japan), where the cast from Disney Twisted-Wonderland are transported to a deserted island through a magic book. As the characters try to find a way to escape the island, they discover Stitch after his ship crashed on the island. When Gantu arrives to apprehend Stitch, they fight Gantu to protect Stitch from being captured.
- In Disney crossover games developed and published by Gameloft:
  - In an April 2018 update to Disney Magic Kingdoms, seven Lilo & Stitch characters (Lilo, Stitch, Nani, Jumba, Pleakley, Cobra Bubbles, and Angel), several attractions based on franchise-related locations and other elements were added to the game as part of a limited time event. The event features an original storyline based on the films and Lilo & Stitch: The Series that involves the Lilo & Stitch characters. Another update released in May 2025 added David, Reuben, and Gantu as a mini-event tie-in for the live-action film's theatrical release, along with another Lilo & Stitch based attraction.
  - In Disney Dreamlight Valley, Stitch (who was added in a December 2022 update during the game's early access period) appears as one of the villagers of the titular Dreamlight Valley. It's revealed after completing a series of quests that takes ten days to complete that he fled the valley during "the Forgetting" to find help. After he returns to the valley, he resides in a house that resembles his and Lilo's bedroom dome on the outside but resembles a condensed version of the Pelekais' home on the inside. Various Lilo & Stitch-themed furniture, design motifs, and other items can also be unlocked.
  - Lilo, Stitch, Jumba, Captain Gantu, and Angel were added to Disney Speedstorm as playable characters on August 1, 2023, for the game's third season of content updates, its last season in early access. The season also added a track environment based on the franchise's depiction of Kauaʻi and several other characters, all of whom apart from Reuben originally debuted in the original film, as crew members.

== Theme park attractions ==
Various Lilo & Stitch-themed attractions have opened in Disney theme parks.

=== Stitch's Great Escape! ===
Stitch's Great Escape! was a "theatre in the round" show that opened on November 16, 2004, in Magic Kingdom at the Walt Disney World Resort as a replacement for the ExtraTERRORestrial Alien Encounter. It last operated on January 6, 2018, and confirmed by Disney officials to be closed on July 16, 2020.

=== Stitch's Supersonic Celebration ===
Stitch's Supersonic Celebration was a short-lived stage show that ran from May 6, 2009, to June 27, 2009, at Magic Kingdom at the Walt Disney World Resort.

=== Stitch Encounter ===
Stitch Encounter is an interactive show similar to Turtle Talk with Crush that opened in 2006 at Hong Kong Disneyland at the Hong Kong Disneyland Resort. Other versions of the attraction opened Walt Disney Studios Park at Disneyland Paris (as Stitch Live!) in 2008, Tokyo Disneyland at Tokyo Disney Resort in Spring 2015, and Shanghai Disneyland Park at Shanghai Disney Resort in 2016. The original version in Hong Kong closed in 2016, and no versions of this attraction have ever opened at either American Disney resort.

=== The Enchanted Tiki Room: Stitch Presents Aloha e Komo Mai! ===
The Enchanted Tiki Room: Stitch Presents Aloha e Komo Mai! is a "theatre in the round" Audio-Animatronics show that opened in 2008 in Tokyo Disneyland at Tokyo Disney Resort, and is the fourth incarnation of The Enchanted Tiki Room.

== Merchandise ==
When the original Lilo & Stitch film was released in 2002, it was accompanied by a huge merchandising campaign, from McDonald's meals to marketing emphasizing Stitch as being as a chaotic character, very different from other Disney heroes.

As of 2025, Stitch is a very important character in the Walt Disney Company’s sale of licensed merchandise, mostly in the form of a very wide array of products. The company's annual financial reports for 2023 and 2024 included Lilo & Stitch as one of nine examples of its major licensed properties. In February 2025, the New York Post reported that Stitch was likely going to be the most popular toy in 2025.

== In other media ==
Lilo, Stitch, Nani, David, Jumba, and Pleakley appeared in the short film Once Upon a Studio (2023).

Angel (voiced by Tara Strong) was featured in a 2026 episode of the short-form drawing tutorial parody series How Not to Draw in which she convinces an animator (Liamani Segura) to draw a big concert for her. Stitch (Chris Sanders) also appears at the end of the episode.

== Reception ==
The original Lilo & Stitch film received positive critical reviews, while the live action remake received a mixed to positive reception and the direct-to-video and television sequels received mixed to negative reception.

Film	Critical		Public	
Film	Rotten Tomatoes	Metacritic	CinemaScore	PostTrak
Lilo & Stitch (2002)	87% (149 reviews)	73 (30 reviews)	A	(Note: Film was released before PostTrak's launch in 2013.)
Stitch! The Movie	20% (5 reviews)	—N/a	—N/a	
Lilo & Stitch 2: Stitch Has a Glitch	42% (12 reviews)	—N/a	—N/a	
Leroy & Stitch	43% (7 reviews)	—N/a	—N/a	
Lilo & Stitch (2025)	72% (214 reviews)	53 (39 reviews)	A	90%
