= List of Stitch! episodes =

Stitch! is a Japanese anime spin-off series of Disney's Lilo & Stitch franchise. It is the second television series in the franchise, following Lilo & Stitch: The Series (2003–2006) and preceding Stitch & Ai (2017). It was produced by Madhouse for its first two seasons (2008–2010), and by Shin-Ei Animation for its third season (2010–2011) and two post-series TV specials (2012 and 2015). Walt Disney Television International Japan co-produced all episodes and specials. The series was also edited for international audiences; the series's English dub aired from 2009 to 2013, and the dubbed versions of the post-series specials aired in 2014 and 2016.

Note that Stitch/Experiment 626 appears in every episode, so he is not included in the "Experiment appearances" list. The international version of the anime, which includes the English dub, is edited from the Japanese original, with some episodes trimmed to eleven-minute segments and combined with other trimmed episodes, and some episodes have aired earlier or later in order as a result of these and other changes. The international episode numbers in the below tables are based on the episode order used by Disney+ Hotstar, although this does not correspond to the English dub's original air dates. Furthermore, the three post-season specials in Japan are considered regular episodes internationally, airing before the final regular episodes of their respective seasons outside of Japan.

== Series overview ==
Season	Title	Studio	Episodes	Originally released		
Season	Title	Studio	Episodes	First released	Last released	Network
1	Stitch!	Madhouse	25 + 1 special	October 8, 2008	June 26, 2009	TV Tokyo
2	Stitch! ~The Mischievous Alien's Great Adventure~	Madhouse	29 (Note: 30 segments) + 1 special	October 13, 2009	August 8, 2010	TV Asahi
3	Stitch! ~Best Friends Forever~	Shin-Ei Animation	29 + 1 special	July 6, 2010	July 19, 2011	TV Asahi
Post-series specials	Stitch! New Specials	Shin-Ei Animation	2 specials	June 16, 2012	August 7, 2015	Disney Channel Japan

== Stitch! (season 1; 2008–2009) ==
Japanese episode no.	International episode no.	Title	Original air date (TV Tokyo)	English air date (Disney Channel Australia)
1	1	"Ichariba Chodei" (Ichariba Choudei [When We Meet, We Become Family]); Transliteration: "Ichariba Choudei" (Japanese: イチャリバチョーデー)	October 8, 2008	December 4, 2009
Several years after the events of Leroy & Stitch, Stitch has since left Lilo and Kauai and is flying around space on a jet scooter he stole from Jumba, going back to his old destructive programming. Jumba attempts to recapture his genetic experiment but the two get caught in a wormhole. Jumba crash-lands his ship on an asteroid in one of Saturn's rings where he finds Pleakley, who has been stranded there as well. Stitch, meanwhile, crash-lands back on Earth, finding himself on an Okinawan island named Izayoi. He goes around the island searching for food, but then he meets a young girl named Yuna. After bonding during a storm, the two become friends. Experiment appearances: Experiment 625 (Reuben), Experiment 624 (Angel)
2	2	"The Good Deed Counter"; Transliteration: "Iikoto Kauntā" (Japanese: イイコトカウンター)	October 8, 2008	December 11, 2009
Stitch is told of a legend that will grant him any wish that he wants, an Okinawan legend; but all the while, he has to help apologize for the damage he caused in Chitama Town with Yuna. All the while, Stitch tries to land a good deed by getting back a letter from Yuna's father, whom she discarded with haste. Later, Jumba and Pleakley manage to escape Saturn and find their way to Izayoi Island, reuniting with Stitch. The two decide to stay with the experiment and his new friend, and Jumba ends up making a bracelet called the Good Deed Counter in order to track Stitch's deeds along the way. Experiment appearances: Experiment 625 (Reuben)
3	3	"Kijimunaa" (Strongest Yokai of the Forest, Kijimuna); Transliteration: "Mori no Saikyō Yōkai Kijimunaa" (Japanese: 森の最強妖怪 キジムナー)	October 15, 2008	December 18, 2009
Obaa tells Stitch and Yuna of a powerful spirit named Kijimunaa, whom they go on an adventure to meet. After finding Kijimunaa, they learn that his home tree was taken over by another yokai named Tachicchu who defeated him in a sumo match by cheating, so they teach Kijimunaa to fight back using his powerful sneeze.
4	4a (Note: Internationally, "Bojo" and "Felix Redux" are trimmed down to 11 minutes each and paired together as the two segments of the first season's fourth episode.)	"Bojo" (The Painting Yokai, Muun); Transliteration: "Peinto Yōkai Mūn" (Japanese: ペイント妖怪むうん)	October 22, 2008	January 11, 2010
Yuna is upset when her classmate Penny draws a bad picture of her. After trying to make her smile and failing, Stitch tries to cheer her up by drawing pictures of her smiling but does so all over the house. She demands he clean it but he instead runs off to the beach where he unknowingly picks up the magical tail brush of Bojo, who lost his brush as he swung it around saying he had lost his desire to draw. Stitch, being angry about Yuna, draws a picture of himself in the sand and is shocked when it comes to life. The giant Stitch drawing then goes on a rampage, and even against Stitch's best efforts, it manages to grab Yuna. Bojo appears and tells Stitch to draw the smiling Yuna again using his brush, who upon being made soothes the Stitch drawing and saves the real Yuna. Finally, Bojo gets his inspiration back for painting.
5	5	"An Electrifying Experience" (The Mysterious Electric Shock Alien); Transliteration: "Nazo no Denki Biribiri Eirian" (Japanese: 謎の電気ビリビリ·エイリアン)	October 29, 2008	January 25, 2010
Hämsterviel tries to take Stitch's good deed counter by controlling Sparky. Experiment appearances: Experiment 625 (Reuben), Experiment 221 (Sparky)
6	6	"Angel's Flight" (Lovelove! Angel); Transliteration: "Sukisuki! Enjeru" (Japanese: すきすき！エンジェル)	November 5, 2008	February 1, 2010
As Yuna and Stitch decide to make a wind chime for Gramma's birthday, Stitch is visited by and reunites with Angel. Yuna tries to get Stitch and Angel involved with making Gramma's present, but she is soon left to make it herself. After Angel sings her siren song to Stitch with a croaky voice, he becomes enraged and causes chaos around the town, eventually breaking the wind chime Yuna made for Gramma. Yuna then blames Angel for "ruining everything" since she arrived, leading Angel to leave in disgrace. After Jumba finally returns Stitch to normal, Stitch and Yuna start to worry after Gramma gives Stitch a note from Angel that reads "Goodbye". After searching around but failing to find her, Kijimunaa reveals he found her and is taking care of her, as she's suffering a head cold. After getting better, Angel finally helps make Gramma's present. Angel then leaves on a cruise ship, waving goodbye to Yuna and Stitch. Experiment appearances: Experiment 624 (Angel)
7	7	"Babeechik" (Stitch Becomes a Mama); Transliteration: "Sutitchi, Mama ni naru" (Japanese: スティッチ、ママになる)	November 12, 2008	February 8, 2010
Stitch accidentally hatches a baby bird who thinks Stitch is its mother. He and Yuna have to bring the baby bird back to the forest.
8	8	"Stitch and the Stitches" (So Many Stitches!); Transliteration: "Sutitchi ga Ippai!" (Japanese: スティッチがいっぱい！)	November 19, 2008	February 15, 2010
Yuna wants to enter an embarrassing photograph for a contest. She decides to take such pictures of Stitch using her grandma's camera, but it's out of film, so she takes a camera made by Jumba to take pictures of Stitch. However, Jumba's "camera" is actually a "carbon compound replication device" designed to make physical duplicates of whatever it takes and processes in instant photos, and soon, many copies of Stitch come out of such photos and invade Izayoi. They steal cameras and begin to make camera stew, saying "Camera!" many times, so Stitch has to put down the many copies of him before the copies destroy all the island's cameras.
9	4b	"Felix Redux" (Cleaning Alien Felix); Transliteration: "Osōji Eirian Firikkusu" (Japanese: お掃除エイリアン フィリックス)	November 26, 2008	January 11, 2010
Stitch is scolded by Yuna for making a mess. Rather than clear it up himself, he borrows a transmitter and calls in Felix to help. Felix cleans up messes all around the island's town, but he starts cleaning away antiques when he runs out of trash and messes to clean. Experiment appearances: Experiment 010 (Felix)
10	9	"Warracchi" (Warracchi has Come!); Transliteration: "Waracchi ga Yattekita!" (Japanese: ワラッチがやってきた！)	December 3, 2008	February 22, 2010
A yōkai named Warracchi starts playing harmless and amusing pranks on the island's inhabitants. Seeing how these pranks seem to make everyone happy, Stitch soon begins playing pranks of his own, but they quickly get out of hand.
11	10a (Note: Internationally, "Hull & Husk" and "Foxy Beige" are trimmed down to 11 minutes each and paired together as the two segments of the first season's tenth episode.)	"Hull & Husk" (Panic in the Pineapple Plant); Transliteration: "Painappuru Kōjō wa Dai Panikku" (Japanese: パイナップル工場は大パニック)	December 10, 2008	March 1, 2010
Yuna has a class visit to the local pineapple factory. She arrives late because Jumba invented a good deed tracker (イイコトメモリ, iikoto memori; good deed memory) to let Yuna type her diaries (and track Stitch via satellite according to the English dub). Stitch is more interested in eating the pineapples. Two yokai who look like pineapples then attack the pineapple factory, peeling the unprocessed pineapples and eating their flesh. Jumba invents a gun to stun and capture the yokai.
12	10b	"Foxy Beige" (Fox Girl Dolores); Transliteration: "Kitsune Shōjo Dorōresu" (Japanese: キツネ少女 ドローレス)	December 17, 2008	March 1, 2010
Yuna gets sick on the day of a festival and Stitch goes with Angel instead. Stitch meets a yōkai named Dolores (Foxy Beige in the English dub), who promises to make fireworks for Yuna in exchange for her own things.
13	11	"Stitch and Santa"; Transliteration: "Sutitchi to Santa-san" (Japanese: スティッチとサンタさん)	December 24, 2008	December 17, 2010
Christmas is coming to the island. Hämsterviel has a plan to hypnotize all the kids of the island to do his bidding by eating evil cookies. Jumba comes up with a plan to reverse the attack. After Yuna and Stitch stop him, they don't think there's gonna be a Christmas. When Santa comes, he gets Stitch to help him send the presents around the island.
14	17b (Note: Internationally, "The Surprise Party" and "Reuben's Rice Balls" are trimmed down to 11 minutes each and paired together as the two segments of the first season's seventeenth episode.)	"Reuben's Rice Balls" (Riceball Reuben); Transliteration: "Onigiri Rūben" (Japanese: おにぎりルーベン)	January 7, 2009	April 26, 2010
Yuna's student Taro doesn't like eating healthy food to win the black belt competition. When Reuben comes, he makes rice balls with secret food in it so Taro can win. Experiment appearances: Experiment 625 (Reuben)
15	12	"Damacchi" (Fireball Boy Damacchi); Transliteration: "Hinotama Bōya Damacchi" (Japanese: 火の玉ぼうや ダマッチ)	January 14, 2009	March 15, 2010
Yuna and Stitch meet a Feebema named Damacchi who doesn't fit in with other Damacchis. They soon realize the reason he doesn't belong is because he's a meteor shower. Experiment appearances: Experiment 624 (Angel)
16	13a (Note: Internationally, "Himamushi" and "Neither Rain Nor Sleet" are trimmed down to 11 minutes each and paired together as the two segments of the first season's thirteenth episode.)	"Himamushi" (Stitch Gets Lazy); Transliteration: "Sutitchi, Gūtara ni naru" (Japanese: スティッチ、グータラになる)	January 21, 2009	March 22, 2010
When JJ, a student at Yuna's dojo, wishes his father wasn't so strict, a yōkai named Himamushi makes it come true. Yuna and Stitch try to convince Himamushi to change him back to normal.
17	14	"Special Guest Star Stitch" (Stitch, Idol Debut?!); Transliteration: "Sutitchi, Aidoru Debyū?!" (Japanese: スティッチ、アイドルデビュー?!)	January 28, 2009	March 29, 2010
Penny shows off a book of her idol, Tetsuo. So Yuna and Stitch pull Penny's book and Stitch tears it up in half. Meanwhile, in Yuna's dojo, directors and producers come and pick Stitch to become an actor. Note: In the English dub of the anime, the Japanese kana on the magazines of Tetsuo are erased and the Japanese title of the show starring Tetsuo is translated as Kid Cop in the dub, although the bullet scenes are unedited.
18	15	"Stitch Sings!" (Stitch's Singing Pride); Transliteration: "Sutitchi no Uta Jiman" (Japanese: スティッチのうたじまん)	February 4, 2009	April 12, 2010
Yuna, Taro and Stitch enter a singing competition, but Stitch realizes he can't sing. Taro really wants to win so he can get a trip to the hot springs for his dad, so Pleakley gives him lessons.
19	13b	"Neither Rain Nor Sleet" (Stitch's Runaway Train); Transliteration: "Sutitchi no Bōsō Ressha" (Japanese: スティッチの暴走列車)	February 11, 2009	March 22, 2010
While Mr. Honda the postman is sick, Yuna and Stitch deliver a dropped letter to a woman named Mrs. Tanaka. Meanwhile, Jumba and Pleakley find a letter for Yuna.
20	16	"Topsy-Turvy" (Teaching Us, Teacher Jumba); Transliteration: "Oshiete Janba-Sensei" (Japanese: 教えてジャンバ先生)	February 18, 2009	April 19, 2010
Jumba gets Stitch to be his new lab assistant, but when Stitch doesn't help properly, he quits and runs into town. Jumba notices some mysterious things going on in town and meets a yokai named Topsy-Turvy who turns things around.
21	17a	"The Surprise Party" (Stitch's Surprise Party); Transliteration: "Sutitchi no Sapuraizu Pātī" (Japanese: スティッチのサプライズパーティー)	February 25, 2009	April 26, 2010
Everyone is planning a surprise party for Yuna, and Stitch promises not to lie to her after he lies for eating her corn and Yuna thinks no one cares about her.
22	18	"The Twin Caverns" (Kijimunaa Explorers); Transliteration: "Kijimunaa Tankentai" (Japanese: キジムナー探検隊)	March 4, 2009	May 10, 2010
Yuna, Stitch, Jumba, and Pleakley help Kijimunaa go to the Twin Caverns so he can become a guardian and help Gramma get better.
23	19	"Pilolo" (Sleeping Angel); Transliteration: "Nemureru Mori no Enjeru" (Japanese: 眠れる森のエンジェル)	March 11, 2009	May 24, 2010
Yuna and Stitch discover that there's a treasure buried in the forest of Shadow Valley. Angel appears and decides to go with them. But when Gramma tells them the horrible legend of the yōkai Pilolo who lives in the forest, they decide not to go. But the treasure dwells on Angel's mind and she sets out to find it on her own. With the help of Kijimunaa, Yuna and Stitch set out to find her. They find her fallen into a deep coma, and they must now find out why. Experiment appearances: Experiment 624 (Angel)
24	21	"Stitch vs. Hämsterviel Pt. I" (Showdown! Stitch vs. Hämsterviel Part 1); Transliteration: "Taiketsu! Sutitchi vs. Hamusutāvīru Pāto Wan" (Japanese: 対決！スティッチ vs.ハムスターヴィール パート1)	March 25, 2009	June 14, 2010
Stitch is captured and now the whole island must rescue him. His friends, Jumba, Angel, Sparky and Felix are brainwashed by Hämsterviel and Gantu, too. Experiment appearances: Experiment 010 (Felix), Experiment 624 (Angel), Experiment 221 (Sparky), Experiment 625 (Reuben)
25	22	"Stitch vs. Hämsterviel Pt. II" (Showdown! Stitch vs. Hämsterviel Part 2); Transliteration: "Taiketsu! Sutitchi vs. Hamusutāvīru Pāto Tsū" (Japanese: 対決！スティッチ vs.ハムスターヴィール パート2)	March 25, 2009	June 14, 2010
Hämsterviel gets Jumba to absorb power from the Spiritual Stone so he can gain ultimate power, while Yuna plans to break a shrunken-down Stitch out of the American football-shaped container Hämsterviel put him in. Experiment appearances: Experiment 010 (Felix), Experiment 624 (Angel), Experiment 221 (Sparky), Experiment 625 (Reuben)
Post-season special
26	20	"Stitch vs. Penny" (Challenge from Piko); Transliteration: "Pīko kara no Chōsenjō" (Japanese: ピーコからの挑戦状)	June 26, 2009 (Disney Channel Japan)	June 7, 2010
Penny challenges Yuna and her karate class to a dojo match and Stitch decides to join in. He loses Yuna's sand necklace and thinks she can do the dojo without it.

== Stitch! ~The Mischievous Alien's Great Adventure~ (season 2; 2009–2010) ==
Beginning after "BooGoo", this season introduces an ending segment called "Kung Fu Dragon Pleak Lee" (カンフードラゴンプリークリー, Kanfū Doragon Purīkurī; a pun based on the names of Pleakley and Bruce Lee), where Pleakley faces off against another alien character, usually one of Jumba's experiments, in a martial arts-style match with Jumba officiating, but usually is defeated by the abilities of his opponent. This segment, which is absent from the English dub, was dropped beginning from Tigerlily's debut episode. Although all the segments were also released on the Japanese DVD box sets, they are not available on Disney+.

Japanese episode no.	International episode no.	Title	Original air date (TV Asahi)	English air date (Disney Channel Australia)
1 (Note: "BooGoo" originally aired as a standard-length episode in Japan but later received an extended version on DVD. The international version used the extended version, splitting the episode into two separate standard-length episodes, "BooGoo, Part One" and "BooGoo, Part Two". Disney+, which currently uses the Japanese original version of the series, uses only the original broadcast version of the episode.)	1 2	"BooGoo" (The #1 Annoying Character in the Universe Appears!); Transliteration: "Uchū Ichi no Meiwaku Kyara, Tōjō!" (Japanese: 宇宙一の迷惑キャラ、登場!)	October 13, 2009	December 9, 2011
When Hämsterviel escapes from prison, he gets a small flying insect to turn Stitch's good deed counter the opposite. Whenever he does a good deed his points go down on his good deed counter and when he does bad things his good deed counter goes up. When Kijumunaa gets really sick, Stitch decides to get rid of his good deed counter and save him along with Yuna. Jumba tries to figure out what's wrong with the good deed counter and Pleakley finds the bug that reversed the good deed counter. Hämsterviel sends Gantu to try to take the Spiritual Stone. Experiment appearances: Experiment 625 (Reuben)
2	3	"A Stinky Episode" (Cute... But Stinky! Stenchy); Transliteration: "Kawaii... Kedo Kusai! Sutenchī" (Japanese: かわいい...けどクサイ! ステンチー)	October 20, 2009	December 30, 2011
Pleakley's parents bring Mr. Stenchy to the island when they come to visit. The little pink experiment causes a really bad aroma on the island and Stitch gets jealous of his cuteness once again. Experiment appearances: Experiment 254 (Mr. Stenchy), Skunkuna (a skunk-like experiment made by Dr. Hämsterviel) Kung Fu Dragon Pleak Lee: Mr. Stenchy, Stitch
3	4	"Dracula, Jr." (Stitch vs. the Vampire on Halloween); Transliteration: "Harowīn wa Sutitchi tai Banpaia" (Japanese: ハロウィーンはスティッチVS.バンパイア)	October 27, 2009	January 6, 2012
On Halloween, Yuna and Stitch meet the son of the famous vampire Dracula, Count Dracula Junior, who goes around Izayoi eating everyone's trick-or-treating candy. Experiment appearances: Experiment 010 (Felix), Experiment 221 (Sparky), Experiment 624 (Angel), Experiment 625 (Reuben) Kung Fu Dragon Pleak Lee: BooGoo, Jumba
4	5	"Sasha" (Stylish Transfer Student, Sae-chan); Transliteration: "Oshare Tenkōsei, Sae-chan" (Japanese: オシャレ転校生、サエちゃん)	November 10, 2009	January 13, 2012
A new girl named Sasha, who is a fashion model, comes into town, causing a rivalry between Yuna and Penny to see who's a better fashion model. Kung Fu Dragon Pleak Lee: Pleakley's Mom, Dupe with a Wendy Pleakley clone
5	6	"Stitch vs. Captain Khan" (Pull up the Ghost Ship!); Transliteration: "Yūreisen o Hikiagero!" (Japanese: 幽霊船を引き上げろ！！)	November 17, 2009	January 20, 2012
Yuna tells Stitch the story of Captain Khan, so Stitch decides to find the pirate and his ship. However. Yuna, Stitch, and Kijimunaa run into a group of young pirates who are looking for the ship as well, so Stitch decides to tag along with them. Kung Fu Dragon Pleak Lee: Checkers, Dr. Hämsterviel
6	7	"Princess Penny" (Alien Power Princess!); Transliteration: "Eirian Pawā de Ohimesama!" (Japanese: エイリアン・パワーでお姫さま！)	November 24, 2009	January 27, 2012
Reuben brings Checkers to Izayoi, and the latter experiment turns Penny into the queen of the island. However, she soon grows tired of controlling everyone and wants Checkers to get off her head, but he refuses to do so. Stitch, who is unaffected by Checkers' powers but gets turned into a living pineapple thanks to a brainwashed Jumba, seeks Reuben's help to remove Checkers from Penny's head and stop her reign, using an incredibly spicy sandwich to get him to come off Penny's head on his own. Experiment appearances: Experiment 029 (Checkers), Experiment 625 (Reuben) Kung Fu Dragon Pleak Lee: Kixx, Slushy
7	8	"Link-age" (Rivals Stuck Together!); Transliteration: "Raibaru ga Kuttsuita!" (Japanese: ライバルがくっついた！)	December 1, 2009	February 3, 2012
Hämsterviel re-evils some experiments using a recording of Angel's siren song and causes them to do chaos again, disrupting a class project at Yuna's school to build a playground for an upcoming festival. Link binds Yuna and Penny together, and Babyfier transforms everybody else (apart from Stitch) into tiny babies. While Stitch takes care of the babies, Yuna and Penny must try and co-operate together to find the antidote to get everyone back to normal. Experiment appearances: Experiment 033 (Hammerface), Experiment 151 (Babyfier), Experiment 251 (Link), Experiment 319 (Spike), Experiment 507 (Woody), Experiment 625 (Reuben) Kung Fu Dragon Pleak Lee: Slugger, Gantu
8	9a (Note: Internationally, "Pteranodon!" and "Pokopon" are trimmed down to 11 minutes each and paired together as the two segments of the second season's tenth episode.)	"Pteranodon!" (The Small Lie That Got Too Big); Transliteration: "Fukurami Sugita Chiisana Uso" (Japanese: ふくらみ過ぎた小さなウソ)	December 8, 2009	February 10, 2012
Yuna gets a keychain from Sasha, but it begins to fall apart, so she tries to hide it from the latter. Shortly afterward, a chicken shows up with a clothespin that was blown of Officer Suzuki's clothes line, which Stitch, Jumba, and Pleakley mistake for being the keychain and chase after it. Hämsterviel notices this from his lab and believes that the clothespin is a key to unlocking the Spiritual Stone, so he decides to go after it by riding a robotic Pteranodon to the island to retrieve it. Experiment appearances: Experiment 625 (Reuben) Kung Fu Dragon Pleak Lee: Wishy-Washy, Reuben
9	11	"We Wishy You a Washy Christmas" (Stitch's Christmas Present); Transliteration: "Sutitchi no Kurisumasu Purezento" (Japanese: スティッチのクリスマスプレゼント)	December 15, 2009	December 23, 2011
It's Christmas time, and when Gantu accidentally sends Experiment 267 (Wishy-Washy) instead of Experiment 297 (Shortstuff), Stitch decides to use Wishy-Washy's ability to grant people's wishes to raise up his good deed counter. However, Yuna wants to get something for Gramma, but she tells her she doesn't need to get her anything. When Penny kicks Ted out of her entourage, he wishes he could ruin Penny's Christmas party and Wishy-Washy accidentally turns her Christmas tree into a monster, and with no more wishes left, Stitch and the others must save Penny. Experiment appearances: Experiment 297 (Shortstuff), Experiment 267 (Wishy-Washy), Experiment 625 (Reuben) Kung Fu Dragon Pleak Lee: Link, Hammerface
10	10	"Switcheroo" (Stitch Turns Wimpy); Transliteration: "Sōshokukei Sutitchi ni Henshin" (Japanese: 草食系スティッチに変身)	December 15, 2009	February 17, 2012
Stitch and Taro accidentally disturb a yokai and switch bodies. Kung Fu Dragon Pleak Lee: Phantasmo, Splodyhead
11	12	"Dads Day" (On Parent's Day, Papa and a Storm Blow in!); Transliteration: "Jugyō Sankan, Papa mo Arashi mo Yattekuru!" (Japanese: 授業参観、パパも嵐もやってくる！)	January 19, 2010	February 24, 2012
Dads Day celebrations are coming up at school, but Yuna believes that her father, who is still away and busy with his research on sea slugs, will not show up. Stitch arranges to have Yuna's father arrive on the island and meets him on his ship. Meanwhile, Hämsterviel decides to use a climate-changing machine under the water near the island to cause a powerful storm so that he and Gantu can steal the Spiritual Stone unopposed. Discovering Hämsterviel's machine, Yuna's father and Stitch take a submarine to destroy the machine and save the ocean. In the end, Yuna finally reunites with her father, just in time for Dads Day. Experiment appearances: Experiment 625 (Reuben) Kung Fu Dragon Pleak Lee: Remmy, Felix
12	13	"A Recurring Nightmare" (Infiltrate Yuna's Dreams); Transliteration: "Yūna no Yume ni Sennyū seyo" (Japanese: ユウナの夢に潜入せよ)	January 26, 2010	March 2, 2012
Because her mother died when she was a baby, Yuna does not remember her face. On a certain night, Stitch finds out, and Experiment 276 (Remmy) entered Yuna's dreams and turns it into a nightmare. Stitch, Jumba, and Pleakley rush after 276 to get Remmy out and save Yuna. Ultimately, Remmy is captured and he allows Yuna to see her mother's face. Experiment appearances: Experiment 276 (Remmy) Kung Fu Dragon Pleak Lee: Amnesio, Blowhard
13	14	"The Return of Amnesio" (Stitch's Stolen Memories); Transliteration: "Kioku o Ubawareta Sutitchi" (Japanese: 記憶をうばわれたスティッチ)	February 2, 2010	March 9, 2012
Experiment 303, Amnesio, comes to the island and starts taking peoples' memories. Experiment appearances: Experiment 025 (Topper), Experiment 303 (Amnesio), Experiment 383 (Swirly), Experiment 390 (Slimy), Experiment 502 (Yang), Experiment 602 (Sinker), Experiment 603 (Zap), Experiment 608 (Slugger), Experiment 619 (Splodyhead), Experiment 625 (Reuben) Kung Fu Dragon Pleak Lee: Hunkahunka, PJ
14	16	"Hunkahunka Burnin' Angel" (Love Angel! Happy Valentine's Day); Transliteration: "Enjeru Daisuki! Happi Barentain" (Japanese: エンジェル大好き！ハッピー バレンタイン)	February 9, 2010	March 23, 2012
Stitch accidentally upsets Angel when he trips and drops a Valentine's Day cake on her. Desperate, Stitch uses Hunkahunka to have her fall in love with him unconditionally. His plan works, but things soon get out of hand, as Hunkahunka starts randomly tapping people. Experiment appearances: Experiment 323 (Hunkahunka), Experiment 624 (Angel), Experiment 625 (Reuben) Kung Fu Dragon Pleak Lee: Angel, Hocker
15	17	"The Return of 627" (Stitch in Danger! Greatest Rival in Love); Transliteration: "Sutitchi Ayaushi! Koi no Saikyou Raibaru" (Japanese: スティッチ危うし！恋の最強ライバル)	February 9, 2010	March 30, 2012
Posing as a human duke, Experiment 627 tries to take Angel away from Stitch. This is all the doing of Dr. Hämsterviel. However, when Stitch and Angel are almost crushed by Hämsterviel's ship, 627 saves them. Experiment appearances: Experiment 624 (Angel), Experiment 625 (Reuben), Experiment 627 Kung Fu Dragon Pleak Lee: 627, Slick
16	15	"The Blue Panther" (Detective Stitch, Search for the Missing Masterpiece!); Transliteration: "Meitantei Sutitchi, Kieta Meiga o Sagase!" (Japanese: 名探偵スティッチ、消えた名画を探せ！)	February 16, 2010	March 16, 2012
A gallery is opened at the hotel Penny's father manages, but a masterpiece is stolen. Stitch imitates a TV detective to find it. Kung Fu Dragon Pleak Lee: Yaarp and Sample, Spike
17	9b	"Pokopon" (No Way?! Papa Has Become Cool!); Transliteration: "Uso!? Papa ga Totsuzen Ikemen ni!" (Japanese: ウソ！？パパが突然イケメンに！)	February 23, 2010	February 10, 2012
Yuna's father returns to the island, but he isn't acting himself. Stitch finds out it's a tanuki pretending to be him and tries to show Yuna the truth. Kung Fu Dragon Pleak Lee: Yin, Frenchfry
18	18	"A Little Hämster Love" (Even Villains Want to be Loved!); Transliteration: "Akuyaku datte Aisaretai!" (Japanese: 悪役だって愛されたい！)	March 2, 2010	April 13, 2012
18	18	"Pleakley Loves Hollywood" (Goodbye, Pleakley); Transliteration: "Sayonara, Purīkurī" (Japanese: さよなら、プリークリー)	March 2, 2010	April 13, 2012
"A Little Hämster Love": One of Hämsterviel's schemes unintentionally ends up making him out to be a hero to the islanders. Experiment appearances: Experiment 625 (Reuben) "Pleakley Loves Hollywood": An alien director comes to the island and decides to make Pleakley a movie star. Experiment appearances: Experiment 221 (Sparky), Experiment 254 (Mr. Stenchy) Kung Fu Dragon Pleak Lee: Woody, Sparky
19	N/A (Note: "Stitch Power" was skipped internationally.)	"Stitch Power" (Stitch Obtains the Greatest Power in the Universe!?); Transliteration: "Sutitchi, Uchū Ichi no Chikara o Te ni Ireru!?" (Japanese: スティッチ、宇宙一の力を手に入れる！？)	March 9, 2010	N/A
Hämsterviel uses Swirly to try to get Stitch to use his wish to make Hämsterviel the ruler of the universe. Experiment appearances: Experiment 383 (Swirly), Experiment 625 (Reuben), Experiment 617 (Plasmoid), Experiment 619 (Splodyhead) Kung Fu Dragon Pleak Lee: Babyfier
20	19	"Tigerlily" (The Sneakiest Beauty on Earth Appears!); Transliteration: "Chikyū Saikyō no Zurui Bijō, Tōjō!" (Japanese: 地球最強のズルい美女、登場！)	April 13, 2010	April 20, 2012
Yuna's mean, bullying cousin Tigerlily (Zuruko) arrives on the island and moves in with her, Stitch, and Gramma. She uses her beauty and fakes kindness to manipulate others. Meanwhile, Hämsterviel plans to use Welco's bubble powers to send Stitch out into the ocean and drown him. Experiment appearances: Experiment 074 (Welco), Experiment 625 (Reuben)
21	20	"Nosy Meets Tigerlily" (Counterattack! Reveal Zuruko's Secret!); Transliteration: "Gyakushū! Zuruko no Himitsu o Barase!" (Japanese: 逆襲！ズル子の秘密をバラせ！)	April 20, 2010	April 27, 2012
When Nosy appears on the island, Yuna attempts to use him to reveal her cousin's cruel nature (as no one believes her). But despite her best efforts, everything keeps turning in her cousin's favor. Experiment appearances: Experiment 199 (Nosy), Experiment 624 (Angel), Experiment 625 (Reuben)
22	21	"Hämsterviel's Epic Secret" (Search for "The Thing" that Can End the World!); Transliteration: "Sagase! Sekai no Owari o Maneku "Are"" (Japanese: 探せ！世界の終わりを招く"アレ")	April 27, 2010	May 4, 2012
Hämsterviel kicks out five of the weaker experiments and they find their way to Earth. However, Hämsterviel needs them back when it is discovered they stole a treasure chest containing a big secret of the tiny genius. Experiment appearances: Experiment 062 (Frenchfry), Experiment 110 (Squeak), Experiment 214 (Pix), Experiment 275 (Tickle-Tummy), Experiment 604 (Houdini), Experiment 625 (Reuben)
23	22	"Shrink" (Tiny, Tiny Stitch's Great Adventure); Transliteration: "Chiisana, Chiisana Sutitchi no Daibōken" (Japanese: 小さな、小さなスティッチの大冒険)	May 4, 2010	May 11, 2012
Jumba, Stitch, and Tigerlily are shrunk by Jumba's first experiment, Shrink. The latter two decide to play some pranks around the island, while Hämsterviel and Gantu go after the shrunken Stitch to crush him. Experiment appearances: Experiment 001 (Shrink), Experiment 625 (Reuben)
24	23	"Stitchman Meets Bonnie and Clyde" (Betrayed, but Still Friends); Transliteration: "Uragirarete mo, Tomodachi" (Japanese: 裏切られても、トモダチ)	May 11, 2010	May 18, 2012
Bonnie and Clyde show up and cause trouble, so Stitch makes himself into a superhero character he calls "Stitchman" to stop them. Experiment appearances: Experiment 149 (Bonnie), Experiment 150 (Clyde), Experiment 625 (Reuben)
25	25	"Wormhole" (Stitch vs. Another Stitch); Transliteration: "Sutitchi tai mō Hitori no Sutitchi" (Japanese: スティッチ vs. もうひとりのスティッチ)	May 25, 2010	June 1, 2012
Stitch and Yuna are sucked into an alternate universe by Experiment 272/Wormhole and meet an evil Stitch with a jetpack who enjoys destroying an abandoned city, along with alternate versions of Jumba, Pleakley, and Gantu. As Yuna tries to convince the alternate universe's 626 that ʻohana is better than destroying things, the Jumba of Yuna and Stitch's universe tells them via her good deed tracker communicator that they only have a limited time to find the interdimensional portal back home or they'll be stuck in the alternate universe. However, only Wormhole knows where the portal is and he refuses to leave until he finds a slipper belonging to Jumba that he lost to a previous portal before, which he believes to be in this alternate universe. Experiment appearances: Experiment 272 (Wormhole, a purple and cyan caterpillar-like experiment)
26	26	"Meega Going to Disneyland!" (Stitch Goes to Tokyo Disneyland!); Transliteration: "Sutitchi, Tōkyō Dizunīrando ni Iku!" (Japanese: スティッチ、東京ディズニーランドに行く！)	June 1, 2010	June 8, 2012
Stitch and his friends are going to Tokyo Disneyland, with Yuna's father, Jumba, Pleakley, and Penny. Experiment appearances: Experiment 625 (Reuben), Experiment 608 (Slugger), Experiment 601 (Kixx), Experiment 523 (Slushy), Experiment 214 (Pix), Experiment 288 (Boomer), Experiment 533 (Blowhard)
27	27	"Raijin" (Stitch becomes a Battery!?); Transliteration: "Sutitchi, Denchi ni naru!?" (Japanese: スティッチ、電池になる！？)	June 8, 2010	June 15, 2012
After finding out that Tigerlily is afraid of lighting, Stitch and Yuna chase a cloud to try and capture Raijin's son, also named Raijin, from it, but he's small and not very scary. Stitch tries to scare Yuna's cousin again but fails, and so does the yokai, so Jumba creates an electric energy drink using Sparky's electricity, which Stitch uses to temporarily gain electricity powers. Experiment appearances: Experiment 221 (Sparky), Experiment 625 (Reuben)
28	28	"The Return of Ploot" (Save Izayoi Island!); Transliteration: "Izayoi-jima o Sukue!" (Japanese: イザヨイ島を救え！ / さよなら、スティッチ)	June 29, 2010	June 22, 2012
All the people are scared of pollution in the sea, so Stitch has to defeat Ploot in order to save it. Experiment appearances: Experiment 625 (Reuben), Experiment 505 (Ploot), Experiment 000 (Zero)
29	29	"Experiment Zero" (Goodbye, Stitch); Transliteration: "Sayonara, Sutitchi" (Japanese: さよなら、スティッチ)	June 29, 2010	June 29, 2012
Stitch is hired by the Grand Councilwoman to save the universe from an evil experiment known as Experiment Zero. Last episode of Stitch! ~The Mischievous Alien's Great Adventure~. Experiment appearances: Experiment 625 (Reuben), Experiment 000 (Zero)
Post-season special
30	24	"Son of Sprout" (Best Brother in the Universe); Transliteration: "Uchu Ichi no Onii-chan" (Japanese: 宇宙一のお兄ちゃん)	August 8, 2010 (Disney Channel Japan)	May 25, 2012
Kijimunaa's sister, Kijimaggie, who looks like him and is pink, visits Izayoi. She worships her brother, believing him to be brave and strong, not knowing how cowardly he is. Her belief is shattered when Kijimunaa is unable to destroy a meteor hurtling towards Izayoi and Stitch does so instead, saving the island. Kijimunaa then finds a strange but hurt living plant on the ground and plants it; noticing his kindness, Kijimaggie's faith in him is restored. What they don't know was that the plant is actually an offspring of Jumba's Experiment 509, Sprout, who was on the meteor that Stitch destroyed, and soon the "Sproutling" grows big and aggressive. Other Sproutlings grow all over the island, strangling everyone with their vines. Stitch tries to stop the Sproutlings by uprooting the main one, but even he is unable to. Kijimunaa notices a tear at the base of the main Sproutling's stem and cries over it, causing one of his magic tears to fall into the tear, healing the Sproutling, returning him to his original size, saving everyone, and causing Kijimaggie to see him as a hero again. Experiment appearances: Experiment 509 (Sprout), (Note: In the English dub, Experiment 509/Sprout is changed to be Experiment 509-A (Sproutling), an offspring of the original Sprout.) Experiment 624 (Angel)

== Stitch! ~Best Friends Forever~ (season 3; 2010–2011) ==
Japanese episode no.	International episode no.	Title	Original air date (TV Asahi)	English air date (Disney Channel Asia)
1	1	"New Town" (Stitch Goes to New Town!); Transliteration: "Sutitchi, Nyū Taun e Yuku!" (Japanese: スティッチ、ニュータウンへ行く！)	July 6, 2010	January 12, 2013
Stitch and Yuna move to Newtown with Tigerlily as the behest of Gramma due to (in the Japanese original only) Izayoi Elementary School closing soon. While there, they meet Dolores, Jessica, her friends Toriko and Makiko, and Hiroman. Later, Stitch wants to return Yuna's handkerchief, but ends up almost destroying the school, which upsets Yuna. Meanwhile Hämsterviel, on orders from his new partner, Lady Delia, has recaptured the other experiments and begun mutating them with additional abilities. His intent is to capture Stitch so Delia can extract the Neo-Power Chip from within him. Stitch later begins to leave and gets attacked by Plasmoid and Splodyhead, and again destroys the school, which then makes Yuna think Stitch has broken his promise and lied to her. Stitch stays away from Yuna to try to catch the two altered experiments, but gets captured by Gantu. Yuna feels guilty for not believing Stitch and goes to find him at school, but then gets attacked by Plasmoid and Splodyhead. Stitch then saves Yuna and she apologizes to him for not believing him. After hearing about Hamsterviel's failure, Delia tortures him with a bomb. Experiment appearances: Experiment 617 (Plasmoid), Experiment 619 (Splodyhead), Experiment 625 (Reuben)
2	2	"Yuna vs. Jessica" (Best Friends Plan!); Transliteration: "Tomodachi Tsukurou Daisakusen!" (Japanese: 友達つくろう大作戦！)	July 13, 2010	January 13, 2013
Yuna continues to try to be Jessica's friend with little progress. However, Yuna has to come to the rescue when Hämsterviel modifies Sample with the ability to control his victims with a powerful melody. Experiment appearances: Experiment 258 (Sample), Experiment 625 (Reuben)
3	3	"Jessica's Birthday!" (Birthday Panic!); Transliteration: "Bāsudē Panikku!" (Japanese: バースデー・パニック！)	July 20, 2010	January 19, 2013
Yuna is trying to attend Jessica's birthday party in another attempt at befriending her, but Jessica invites Yuna only to humiliate her and have her clean up before and after the party. Hämsterviel is inspired by this and outfits Wrapper with the ability to trap his enemies in indestructible gift boxes. Experiment appearances: Experiment 521 (Wrapper), Experiment 625 (Reuben)
4	4	"Dorkifier" (Handsome Guy's Secret); Transliteration: "Ikemen no Himitsu" (Japanese: イケメンの秘密)	July 27, 2010	January 20, 2013
Hiroman's team is going to be on TV, and everyone's getting excited about the event. While trying to return some things, Yuna learns the soccer captain is blackmailed by his sisters, who are Tigerlily's old friends. Meanwhile, Gantu gets the wrong experiment and Dorkifier is released on the town, sticking people including Stitch, Yuna, Hiroman, and Pleakley in ridiculous outfits. Hiroman's so upset with his new look he doesn't want to come out. Experiment appearances: Experiment 022 (Hertz Donut), Experiment 122 (Dorkifier), Experiment 625 (Reuben)
5	5	"Spooky Toons" (Scary Summer Camp); Transliteration: "Kowai Samā Kyanpu" (Japanese: こわ～いサマーキャンプ)	August 3, 2010	January 26, 2013
Yuna's class heads off to camp where she volunteers to help out with the haunted trail in order to spook Jessica. She gets some extra help from Delores, Stitch, Jumba, and Pleakley in doing so. However, Gantu's not too far behind with both Toons and Spooky in hopes of catching Stitch. Experiment appearances: Experiment 300 (Spooky), Experiment 112 (Toons), Experiment 047 (Lorider), Experiment 624 (Angel), Experiment 625 (Reuben)
6	6	"P.J. 2.0" (Get the Limited-Time Sweets!); Transliteration: "Gentei suītsu o te ni irero!" (Japanese: 限定スイーツを手に入れろ！)	August 10, 2010	January 27, 2013
The whole town's excited over a local limited-time-only dessert called fluffy rolls. However, Stitch's cousin PJ is given a Stitch costume and starts framing Stitch for a variety of pranks. Experiment appearances: Experiment 133 (PJ), Experiment 625 (Reuben)
7	7	"Spike 2.0" (Burn! Quiz Competition); Transliteration: "Moero! Kuizu taikai" (Japanese: 燃えろ！クイズ大会)	August 17, 2010	February 2, 2013
While Delia is away, Hämsterviel decides to compete in a child prodigy show on Earth for the big cash prize alongside Reuben and Gantu. Also competing for their school are Jessica, Yuna, and Delores. Realizing the competition is fierce, Hämsterviel decides to cheat with Spike's help. Experiment appearances: Experiment 319 (Spike), Experiment 625 (Reuben)
8	8	"Sprout 2.0" (Stitch Becomes a Traitor?!); Transliteration: "Sutitchi wa uragirimono?" (Japanese: スティッチは裏切り者？)	August 24, 2010	February 3, 2013
Gantu and Reuben trick the kids into going to a deserted island to find a flower said to grant wishes. Only they find Sprout, now upgraded with 627's DNA. Experiment appearances: Experiment 509 (Sprout), Experiment 625 (Reuben)
9	9	"Stitch's Birthday, Part One" The Day Stitch was Born (Part One); Transliteration: "Sutitchi ga umaretahi (zenpen)" (Japanese: スティッチが生まれた日（前編）)	August 31, 2010	April 13, 2013
Stitch and Yuna go back in time to the day Jumba built Stitch. Experiment appearances: Experiment 047 (Lorider), Experiment 199 (Nosy), Experiment 625 (Reuben)
10	10	"Stitch's Birthday, Part Two" The Day Stitch was Born (Part Two); Transliteration: "Sutitchi ga umaretahi (kōhen)" (Japanese: スティッチが生まれた日（後編）)	September 7, 2010	April 20, 2013
Yuna, Stitch, and Pleakley have messed up the timeline by traveling to the past and Jumba must finish building Stitch before it is too late. Experiment appearances Experiment 009 (Pop), Experiment 123 (Carmen), Experiment 221 (Sparky), Experiment 262 (Ace), Experiment 540 (Phoon), Experiment 625 (Reuben)
11	12	"Stitch Goes to Wishlanda" (Stitch Becomes Peter Pan); Transliteration: "Sutitchi, pītā pan ni naru!" (Japanese: スティッチ、ピーター・パンになる！)	October 12, 2010	February 23, 2013
Stitch, Yuna, and a mass number of other students go to an amusement park created by Hämsterviel called Wishlanda, where they have nothing but fun and their every wish gets granted by a disguised Wishy-Washy. However, those who visit become too exhausted to do anything, allowing Hämsterviel to possess them using their "point badges". Experiment appearances: Experiment 267 (Wishy-Washy), Experiment 625 (Reuben)
12	11	"Flute" (Big Brother Stitch); Transliteration: "Sutitchi Onii-san" (Japanese: スティッチ兄さん)	October 19, 2010	February 16, 2013
Stitch and Yuna find a mysterious yellow alien flutist, who quickly gets everybody's collective attention. What nobody realizes is Flute (named Bragg in the Japanese original) is actually Experiment 145 (misnumbered 021, the number of "Twang", in the Japanese original), who not only frames Stitch for mass destruction but the more attention he gets, the stronger Flute becomes, even to the point where he can outdo Stitch. Experiment appearances: Experiment 145 (Bragg/Flute), Experiment 625 (Reuben)
13	14	"Witch" (Halloween Party at the Witch's House); Transliteration: "Majo yashiki de harou~īn pātī" (Japanese: 魔女屋敷でハロウィーン・パーティー)	October 26, 2010	February 3, 2013
While setting up a Halloween party for the school, Jessica becomes possessed by the experiment Witch, turning her into a literal witch. Experiment appearances: Experiment 610 (Witch), Experiment 625 (Reuben)
14	13	"Hämjock Vielvonster" (HV Flame Attack); Transliteration: "Honō no HV atakku!" (Japanese: 炎のHVアタック！)	November 9, 2010	February 3, 2013
Hämsterviel disguises himself as a substitute teacher to get close to Stitch, also becoming the coach of the school's 5th grade girls' volleyball team. The only problem is that he's starting to like the job and becomes invested in the team's upcoming game against the 6th grade team. Experiment appearances: Experiment 515 (Deforestrator), Experiment 625 (Reuben)
15	15	"Shogun" (The Lord has Come!); Transliteration: "O-tonosama ga yattekita!" (Japanese: お殿様がやってきた！)	November 16, 2010	March 16, 2013
Yuna has to do a report on shoguns and what they eat, so she borrows Toons to bring a picture of a shogun's dinner to life, only to bring an actual shogun to life. Not only does she have to hide him, Tigerlily falls for the shogun and Hämsterviel decides to upgrade Kixx with a katana. Experiment appearances: Experiment 112 (Toons), Experiment 601 (Kixx), Experiment 625 (Reuben)
16	17	"Elastico 2.0" (Yuna Becomes a Puppy, Woof!); Transliteration: "Yūna ga inu ni natta wan!" (Japanese: ユウナが犬になったワン！)	November 23, 2010	March 30, 2013
Yuna gets turned into a dog by a transmutated Elastico. Mistaking Yuna's dog form as a stray, Jessica takes her home in the latest attempt to date Hiroman, prompting a rescue from Stitch. Experiment appearances: Experiment 345 (Elastico), Experiment 625 (Reuben)
17	16	"The Petite Queen" (She's popular!?); Transliteration: "Ano ko ga ninkimono!?" (Japanese: あの子が人気者！？)	November 30, 2010	March 23, 2013
Toriko, the tall girl of Jessica's group, signs up for a teenage beauty contest alongside Jessica. Feeling crushed, she accepts Yuna's help in the event. However, Hämsterviel, having bad memories about Homecoming, sends down a stronger Thresher to wreck the show. Experiment appearances: Experiment 544 (Thresher), Experiment 625 (Reuben)
18	18	"Reuben 2.0" (Get Back Angel!); Transliteration: "Enjeru o torimodose!" (Japanese: エンジェルを取り戻せ！)	December 7, 2010	May 25, 2013
Hämsterviel gives Reuben an upgrade, in hopes he'll capture Stitch. But problems arise when Reuben's more interested in Angel. Experiment appearances: Experiment 624 (Angel), Experiment 625 (Reuben)
19	19	"A Very Stinky Christmas" (Protect the World's Christmas!); Transliteration: "Se kai no kurisumasu o mamore!" (Japanese: 世界のクリスマスを守れ！)	December 14, 2010	December 2013
Stitch plans a Christmas party and invites Yuna's father and grandmother to New Town to surprise Yuna. Meanwhile, Hämsterviel gives out clones of Mr. Stenchy and Mrs. Sickly out as presents as part of an evil plot. However, the clones are spread all across Earth, and Hämsterviel, Gantu and Reuben must temporally join forces with Stitch and the others to replace them with harmless robotic replicas because their combined smells will destroy Earth. Experiment appearances: Experiment 254 (Mr. Stenchy), Experiment 255 (Mrs. Sickly), Experiment 625 (Reuben)
20	20	"Swapper 2.0" (Stitch Becomes a Handsome Guy!?); Transliteration: "Sutitchi ga ikemen ni!?" (Japanese: スティッチがイケメンに！？)	December 21, 2010	June 1, 2013
Stitch and Hiroman swap bodies. While the two enjoy being each other, Hämsterviel sends down Heat (Note: Misidentified as Experiment 619/Splodyhead in the English dub of the episode, with the English closing credits misspelling 619's name as "Splodeyhead".) to capture Stitch in Hiroman's body. Experiment appearances: Experiment 355 (Swapper), Experiment 609 (Heat), Experiment 625 (Reuben)
21	21	"Experiment-a-palooza" (Promise to Mega-Stitch); Transliteration: "Megasutitchi to no yakusoku" (Japanese: メガスティッチとの約束)	January 11, 2011	June 8, 2013
Tired of being Hämsterviel's errand boy, Gantu tries to strike out on his own, losing five experiments in the school. However, Stitch is hit by both Retro and Shrink, turning him into a giant version of his old self. Experiment appearances: Experiment 001 (Shrink), Experiment 110 (Squeak), Experiment 177 (Clip), Experiment 204 (Nosox), Experiment 210 (Retro), Experiment 625 (Reuben)
22	22	"Stitch Ahoy!" (Protect the Gorgeous Cruise Ship!); Transliteration: "Gouka kyakusen wo mamore!" (Japanese: 豪華客船を守れ！)	January 18, 2011	June 15, 2013
Reuben pretends to be Angel and invites Stitch and friends onto a cruise ship where Hämsterviel plans to throw Stitch overboard so he can catch him without resistance. When Reuben fails, Hämsterviel sends out Sinker and Slushy to capture Stitch. Experiment appearances: Experiment 523 (Slushy), Experiment 602 (Sinker), Experiment 624 (Angel) costume, Experiment 625 (Reuben)
23	23	"Lilo" (Reunion with Lilo); Transliteration: "Lilo to saikai suru hi" (Japanese: リロと再会する日)	January 25, 2011	June 22, 2013
While taking Yuna to school, Stitch spies someone who appears to be Lilo. Both Pleakley and Jumba are unconvinced as Lilo was starting college when they last spoke. While seeing Stitch happy with this girl, Yuna learns of how Lilo and Stitch broke up. Pleakley explains that Stitch went on a four-year mission and Lilo went to college with the promise that they would meet when they returned, but Lilo didn't. Seeing the confusion, Hämsterviel uses Morpholomew, now with the ability to transform himself into any picture the experiment sees to capture Stitch. While trying to rescue Stitch, Yuna discovers the girl Stitch has been following is actually Ani, Lilo's near-identical daughter. After stopping Gantu and capturing Morpholomew, Stitch learns that the reason Lilo didn't show up was that Lilo's sister Nani had given birth at the same time as their meeting, and the two make up after years apart. Experiment appearances: Experiment 316 (Morpholomew), Experiment 625 (Reuben)
24	25	"Toddler-fier" (Fight! Chibi Child Army!); Transliteration: "Tatakae! Chibi-kko gundan!" (Japanese: 戦え！ちびっ子軍団！)	February 1, 2011	September 8, 2013
Hämsterviel sends an upgraded Babyfier to turn Stitch into a child so Stitch would be easier to catch. Instead, Babyfier turns Yuna and her classmates into kids. With Tigerlily more preoccupied for an upcoming date, Stitch is running himself ragged keeping the kids in check. Experiment appearances: Experiment 151 (Babyfier), Experiment 625 (Reuben)
25	24	"Chocolate Stitch" (Stitch Becomes Chocolate); Transliteration: "Sutitchi, choko ni naru" (Japanese: スティッチ、チョコになる)	February 8, 2011	September 1, 2013
It's Valentine's Day and everyone goes to a chocolate factory where Angel is performing. After the concert, they all go and make personalized chocolate valentines, but Hämsterviel is scheming to use Fudgy, now outfitted with the ability to grow after eating chocolate. Experiment appearances: Experiment 054 (Fudgy), Experiment 624 (Angel), Experiment 625 (Reuben)
26	26	"Stitch's Dreams" (Let's Go! Inside Stitch's Dreams); Transliteration: "Ikuzo! Sutitchi no yume no naka e" (Japanese: 行くぞ！スティッチの夢の中へ)	February 15, 2011	September 22, 2013
It's Yuna's birthday, but she thinks everyone has forgotten...even Stitch! While preparing Yuna's surprise party, Stitch falls asleep and Hämsterviel sends Remmy to trap him in his own dreams, causing Stitch to get sick. Yuna and Jumba most go inside Stitch's head to catch Remmy before Gantu and Reuben capture him. Experiment appearances: Experiment 276 (Remmy), Experiment 624 (Angel), Experiment 625 (Reuben)
27	28	"King Meega!" (I Want to be King!); Transliteration: "Ōsama ni naritai!" (Japanese: 王様になりたい！)	February 22, 2011	October 6, 2013
Checkers escapes Hämsterviel and runs amok at Yuna's school, causing the students to fight for the power to control everyone. Experiment appearances: Experiment 029 (Checkers), Experiment 625 (Reuben)
28	29	"Boss" (Boss Stitch Appears!); Transliteration: "Sutitchi oyabun, tōjō!" (Japanese: スティッチ親分、登場！)	March 1, 2011	October 13, 2013
Jumba has developed a second and stronger Power Chip, one stolen by Delia. To test it, Hämsterviel uses it on Dupe so each duplicate made is stronger than the last. Stitch decides to use Dupe so that he can get out of his chores and trouble ensues. Experiment appearances: Experiment 344 (Dupe), Experiment 625 (Reuben), Dark End (an experiment created by Delia)
29	30	"Dark-End" (The Greatest Crisis Ever! Rise Up, Stitch); Transliteration: "Shijō saidai no pinchi! Tachiagare Sutitchi" (Japanese: 史上最大のピンチ！立ちあがれスティッチ)	March 8, 2011	October 20, 2013
Delia finishes making a new experiment who is stronger than Stitch named "Dark End". Dark End and Stitch battle, leaving Stitch unconscious. Experiment appearances: Experiment 110 (Squeak), Experiment 133 (PJ), Experiment 151 (Babyfier), Experiment 262 (Ace), Experiment 316 (Morpholomew), Experiment 319 (Spike), Experiment 345 (Elastico), Experiment 619 (Splodyhead), Experiment 624 (Angel), Experiment 625 (Reuben), Dark End (Delia's experiment)
Post-season special
30	27	"Ace's Back!" (Heroes Have it Hard); Transliteration: "Hīrō wa tsurai yo" (Japanese: ヒーローはつらいよ)	June 19, 2011 (Disney Channel Japan)	September 29, 2013
Taking place before the events of "Boss" and "Dark-End", Ace appears to save the day and Stitch decides to help him. However, Ace's relentless and restless heroism causes him to develop back and body aches, depleting his powers and confidence. Experiment appearances: Experiment 262 (Ace), Experiment 625 (Reuben)

== Stitch! New Specials (post-series specials) ==
On Disney+, both specials have been split into two episodes each and are listed as part of season three (Stitch! ~Best Friends Forever~).

Special no.	Season 3 ep. no. (Disney+)	Title	Original air date (Disney Channel Japan)	English air date (Disney Channel Asia)
1	31, 32	Stitch and the Planet of Sand; Transliteration: "Sutitchi to Suna no Wakusei" (Japanese: スティッチと砂の惑星)	June 16, 2012	November 16, 2014
To confront a planetary war at the sand planet of Katuna, Stitch must leave Yuna and Earth behind. Experiment appearances: Experiment 624 (Angel), Experiment 199 (Nosy), Experiment 262 (Ace), Experiment 110 (Squeak), Experiment 625 (Reuben)
2	33, 34	Stitch! Perfect Memory (alternate English title: Stitch! A Perfect Memory); Transliteration: "Sutitchi! Pāfekuto memorī" (Japanese: スティッチ！パーフェクト・メモリー)	August 7, 2015	February 12, 2016
Yuna goes missing and Stitch goes on a desperate search to find her. This episode was first announced on Stitch Day 2015 (June 26). Experiment appearances: Experiment 523 (Slushy), Experiment 062 (Frenchfry), Experiment 625 (Reuben)

== See also ==
- Stitch!
- List of Lilo & Stitch: The Series episodes
- Stitch & Ai
