= Disney Friends =

2007 video game

- European cover art
- Developer: Amaze Entertainment
- Publisher: Disney Interactive Studios
- Platform: Nintendo DS
- Release: EU: October 19, 2007; NA: February 26, 2008; JP: June 26, 2008
- Genres: Adventure, life simulation
- Modes: Single-player, multiplayer

Disney Friends is a simulation and adventure video game released in 2007 by Amaze Entertainment for the Nintendo DS loosely based on several animated Disney films. Published by Disney Interactive Studios, the game features characters Stitch from Lilo & Stitch, Dory from Finding Nemo, Pooh from Winnie the Pooh, Simba from The Lion King and a Little Green Men alien from Toy Story. Players are able to befriend and interact with each film character through the Nintendo DS' microphone and touch screen, which influence the activities and emotions of the game's characters.

== Gameplay ==
Disney Friends features adventure elements which offer players the opportunity to bond with the characters, while exploring film environments and moments. All activities and interactions are meant to teach players about responsibility, nurture, and the importance of helping others. Tinker Bell provides guidance as the player progresses through the game. The player is tasked to look after the featured Disney characters. This includes feeding them food, such as: a peanut butter and jelly sandwich, Space Chicken, Kelp Crunchy, Honey Cake, and Bug Crunchy. Various collectibles can be earned as the player completes tasks and achievements, such as readable pins and gold currency to buy food, clothes, and toys.

The game allows players to experience special events and holidays by utilizing the Nintendo DS' clock. The game contains a day/night cycle which affects the behavior of characters and gameplay. The game also features the option to connect wirelessly or online via Nintendo Wi-Fi Connection in order to connect with the player's worlds. The game's online services were discontinued with the closure of Nintendo Wi-Fi Connection in 2014.

== Reception ==
Disney Friends received mostly mixed reviews from critics. Common Sense Media praised the game for "encouraging nurturing behavior." Ken McKown of ZTGD said "the simplistic and satisfying gameplay is enough to keep you interested." Famitsu scored the game a 22 out of 40.
