= Stitch's Supersonic Celebration =

Defunct live stage show

Magic Kingdom
- Area: Tomorrowland
- Status: Removed
- Opening date: May 6, 2009
- Closing date: June 27, 2009
- Replaced by: A Totally Tomorrowland Christmas

Ride statistics
- Attraction type: Stage show
- Theme: Lilo & Stitch
- Duration: 25 minutes

Stitch's Supersonic Celebration was a live stage show featuring Stitch performed in the Tomorrowland section of the Magic Kingdom at the Walt Disney World Resort. Construction began in the east of Tomorrowland in late 2008 and was completed in April 2009. Opening on May 6, 2009, the show received poor critical reception and closed the following month.

== Synopsis ==
The show featured a host named Tip Trendo, supposedly an on-the-scene reporter for the Tomorrowland News Network (TNN). There were also four female backup dancers, as well as two robots. The star, however, was Stitch, initially on a video screen and then in costumed form. The Stitch character on the video screen was able to interact with guests, using the same technology as in Turtle Talk with Crush, an interactive show inside The Seas with Nemo and Friends at Disney's Epcot theme park. During "Stitch's Supersonic Celebration", guests celebrated "Galaxy Day" by singing and dancing along to an odd mixture of popular music, including Elvis Presley tunes, "The Future Has Arrived" from Meet the Robinsons, and "These Boots Are Made for Walkin'".

== Closing ==
After only a six-week run, Stitch's Supersonic Celebration closed on June 27, 2009. Some credit the show's early demise to the lack of shade; there were only a few awnings under which to hide from the hot Florida sun. Also, the screen where Stitch was shown was hard to see under direct sunlight. The stage originally built for Stitch's Supersonic Celebration is now used seasonally for stage shows such as "A Totally Tomorrowland Christmas Show" during Mickey's Very Merry Christmas Party.
