= Disney Universe =

2011 action-adventure video game created by Disney

- North American Xbox 360 cover art
- Developer: Eurocom
- Publisher: Disney Interactive Studios
- Composer: Steve Duckworth Jim Croft Jeremy Corbett Guy Cockcroft
- Platforms: Windows, PlayStation 3, Wii, Xbox 360
- Release: NA: October 25, 2011; AU: October 27, 2011; EU: October 28, 2011
- Genre: Action-adventure
- Modes: Single-player, multiplayer

Disney Universe is a co-operative action-adventure video game developed by Eurocom and published by Disney Interactive Studios. The game was released on Microsoft Windows, PlayStation 3, Wii and Xbox 360 in October 2011 in North America and Europe. It features the ability to suit up as characters from multiple Disney franchises, including Aladdin, The Lion King, Monsters, Inc., WALL-E, Finding Nemo, Pirates of the Caribbean, Phineas and Ferb, Tron: Legacy and The Muppet Show. The game was made backward-compatible for Xbox One and Series X/S on November 15, 2021.

== Gameplay ==
Up to four friends can connect through local multiplayer and play through 6 different worlds to defeat enemies, and collect powerups and coins. One unique feature is that the enemies actively try to hinder a player's progress by setting up traps or hiding key items.

The two main attractions of the game are the levels and the costumes. Players travel to 6 worlds from classic and contemporary Disney and Pixar properties, consisting of Alice in Wonderland, Pirates of the Caribbean, The Lion King, WALL-E, Monsters, Inc., and Aladdin. The travellers can acquire 45 costumes based on numerous other Disney franchises, such as The Little Mermaid, Tron, Mickey Mouse, Lilo & Stitch and Finding Nemo.

=== Character mode ===
The costumes need to be upgraded by finding stars in the levels. The skill set remains the same for each, but becomes more powerful. Each character has a handheld weapon specific to that character.

== Development ==
=== Downloadable content ===
Downloadable content has been announced to be a big part of Disney Universe for the PlayStation 3, Wii, and Xbox 360 versions of the game. Through the "Online Shop" featured in the game or the PlayStation Store and Xbox Marketplace, the DLCs featured additional costumes and worlds. The first release featured a Disney Villains Costume Pack. A theme-pack based on The Nightmare Before Christmas, was released near the Christmas season and is the Disney Universe voting poll winner. Theme-packs based on Phineas and Ferb, and The Muppets were released in March 2012.

=== Re-release ===
Disney Universe: Ultimate Edition included the original Disney Universe game along with all six downloadable content packs. The extra downloadable content included packs from The Disney Villains, The Nightmare Before Christmas, The Jungle Book, Phineas and Ferb, The Muppets and the Neverland pack.

The Ultimate Edition was released on June 27, 2012, in PAL regions, but not in North America and other NTSC regions.

Reception

Aggregate score
Aggregator	Score		
Aggregator	PS3	Wii	Xbox 360
Metacritic	70/100	61/100	66/100

Review scores
Publication	Score		
Publication	PS3	Wii	Xbox 360
Game Informer	6.5/10	6.5/10	6.5/10
IGN	7/10	7/10	7/10
Nintendo Life		5/10	
Nintendo World Report		5/10	
Official Nintendo Magazine		76%	

== Reception ==
The game received mixed reviews on all of its released platforms. Where it is praised, there are the same negatives. When writing for the Disney Universe experience, Druanne Miyamoto video game reviewer journalist for Metacritic describes the game as an excited detailed game "(...) players will never get bored exploring the Disney Universe." and although it's not exactly alike to the films they represent it still provides the player with a sense of "freshness". For the WIRED review, Michael Venables complains about how the environment seems "watered down" and how its "Disneyness" is taken away from the characters designs. Just as well he connected the game's similarities to that of the Lego video games series' following the same game mechanics.

== See also ==
- List of Disney video games
