= Production history of the Idaho Shakespeare Festival =

Production history of plays performed by the Idaho Shakespeare Festival, as of May 2020. The sections are sorted by venue. The festival has utilized a single venue each season, starting with the plaza outside the One Capital Center, and eventually facilitating the construction of its own theatre known as the Idaho Shakespeare Festival Amphitheater and Reserve.

== One Capital Center (1977-1980) ==
In 1976, founder Doug Copsey noted a green-space in downtown Boise, Idaho that could function as an outdoor performance area. The first performance of the Idaho Shakespeare Festival premiered in the summer of 1977 in the plaza outside the One Capital Center. The festival presented its first seasons in partnership with the Main Street Bistro, later known as Ray's Oasis.

In the first years of the Festival, the only plays produced were works of William Shakespeare.

ISF Production History: 1977-1980
Year	Play
1977	A Midsummer Night's Dream
1978	The Two Gentlemen of Verona
1979	The Merry Wives of Windsor
1979	Romeo and Juliet
1980	The Comedy of Errors
1980	The Taming of the Shrew
1980	The Merchant of Venice

== The Plantation (1981-1983) ==
In the spring of 1981, Ray's Oasis announced they would be vacating the One Capital Center building and the festival would need to find a new outdoor performance venue. They were given permission to use a plot of land on the Plantation Golf Club. After they drained a pond located on the site, a part of the land-use arrangement, they were able to set up a new outdoor performance area.

In the final year at this venue, the Festival produced their first work from an author other than Shakespeare.

ISF Production History: 1981-1983
Year	Play	Playwright
1981	The Tempest	William Shakespeare
1981	Much Ado About Nothing	William Shakespeare
1981	As You Like It	William Shakespeare
1982	Hamlet	William Shakespeare
1982	Twelfth Night	William Shakespeare
1982	A Midsummer Night's Dream	William Shakespeare
1983	Henry IV, Part One	William Shakespeare
1983	Love's Labor's Lost	William Shakespeare
1983	The Merry Wives of Windsor	William Shakespeare
1983	The Curate Shakespeare As You Like It	William Shakespeare Don Nigro

== ParkCenter (1984-1997) ==
After the festival lost the lease at The Plantation, it moved to a park in Boise: ParkCenter. The Festival remained here until 1997 until the construction of its own outdoor theatre space.

=== The 1980s ===
ISF Production History: 1984-1989
Year	Play	Playwright
1984	King Lear	William Shakespeare
1984	The Taming of the Shrew	William Shakespeare
1984	Robin Hood	Don Nigro
1984	The World of Shakespeare	
1984	Billy Bishop Goes to War	John Gray
1984	Sister Mary Ignatius Explains It All for You	Christopher Durang
1984	Crimes of the Heart	Beth Henley
1985	Richard III	William Shakespeare
1985	The Two Gentlemen of Verona	William Shakespeare
1985	The Winter's Tale	William Shakespeare
1985	Waiting for Godot	Samuel Beckett
1985	Robin Hood	Don Nigro
1986	A Midsummer Night's Dream	William Shakespeare
1986	Othello	William Shakespeare
1986	All's Well that Ends Well	William Shakespeare
1986	Pendragon	Don Nigro
1987	Romeo and Juliet	William Shakespeare
1987	The Comedy of Errors	William Shakespeare
1987	Pericles	William Shakespeare
1987	The Adventures of Sherlock Holmes	Mark Rosenwinkel
1987	Mark Twain, Hisownself	Cynthia Gaede (adapter) Dan Peterson (adapter)
1988	As You Like It	William Shakespeare
1988	Measure for Measure	William Shakespeare
1988	Titus Andronicus	William Shakespeare
1988	Quilters	Molly Newman Barbara Damashek
1988	What the Butler Saw	Joe Orton
1988	Macbeth	William Shakespeare
1989	Much Ado About Nothing	William Shakespeare
1989	Troilus and Cressida	William Shakespeare
1989	Richard II	William Shakespeare
1989	Waiting for the Parade	John Murrell
1989	A Touch of the Poet	Eugene O'Neill

=== The 1990s ===
ISF Production History: 1990-1997
Year	Play	Playwright
1990	The Merry Wives of Windsor	William Shakespeare
1990	The Merchant of Venice	William Shakespeare
1990	Henry VIII	William Shakespeare
1990	A Woman of Means	R.N. Sandberg
1990	The Skin of Our Teeth	Thornton Wilder
1991	The Tempest	William Shakespeare
1991	Twelfth Night	William Shakespeare
1991	Macbeth	William Shakespeare
1991	A Woman of Means	R. N. Sandberg
1991	The Crucible	Arthur Miller
1992	Romeo and Juliet	William Shakespeare
1992	The Taming of the Shrew	William Shakespeare
1992	Richard III	William Shakespeare
1992	Scapino	Frank Dunlop Jim Dale
1993	Quilters	Molly Newman Barbara Damashek
1993	A Midsummer Night's Dream	William Shakespeare
1993	Tartuffe	Molière
1993	The Comedy of Errors	William Shakespeare
1993	A Christmas Carol	Charles Dickens Richard Hellesen (adapter) David de Berry (adapter)
1994	Dancing at Lughnasa	Brian Friel
1994	Much Ado About Nothing	William Shakespeare
1994	Julius Caesar	William Shakespeare
1994	As You Like It	William Shakespeare
1994	A Christmas Carol	Charles Dickens Richard Hellesen (adapter) David de Berry (adapter)
1995	The Two Gentlemen of Verona	William Shakespeare
1995	Love's Labor's Lost	William Shakespeare
1995	Henry IV, Part One	William Shakespeare
1995	Henry IV, Part Two	William Shakespeare
1996	The Complete Works of William Shakespeare (Abridged)	Adam Long Daniel Singer Jess Winfield
1996	The Merry Wives of Windsor	William Shakespeare
1996	The Tempest	William Shakespeare
1996	Twelfth Night	William Shakespeare
1997	Private Lives	Noël Coward
1997	The Merchant of Venice	William Shakespeare
1997	The Taming of the Shrew	William Shakespeare
1997	Macbeth	William Shakespeare

== Idaho Shakespeare Festival Amphitheater (1998-Present) ==
In 1997, the Festival broke ground on their current home: The Idaho Shakespeare Festival Amphitheater and Reserve. Due to an agreement with the Idaho Foundation for Parks & Lands and the Idaho Department of Parks & Recreation, the theatre exists in a habitat reserve along the Boise River.

=== The Late 1990s ===
ISF Production History: 1998-1999
Year	Play	Playwright
1998	A Midsummer Night's Dream	William Shakespeare
1998	Romeo and Juliet	William Shakespeare
1998	Cymbeline	William Shakespeare
1999	A Midsummer Night's Dream	William Shakespeare
1999	Scapin	Molière Shelley Berc Andrei Belgrader Rusty Magee
1999	The Winter's Tale	William Shakespeare
1999	Titus Andronicus	William Shakespeare
1999	The Complete Works of William Shakespeare (Abridged)	Adam Long Daniel Singer Jess Winfield

=== The 2000s ===
ISF Production History: 2000-2009
Year	Play	Playwright
2000	The Complete Works of William Shakespeare (Abridged)	Adam Long Daniel Singer Jess Winfield
2000	The Three Musketeers	Alexander Dumas Linda Alper (adapter) Douglas Langworthy (adapter) Penny Metropulos (adapter)
2000	The Two Gentlemen of Verona	William Shakespeare
2000	Othello	William Shakespeare
2000	Pump Boys and Dinettes	John Foley, Mark Hardwick Debra Monk, Cass Morgan John Schimmel, Jim Wann
2001	The Two Gentlemen of Verona	William Shakespeare
2001	Amadeus	Peter Shaffer
2001	Much Ado About Nothing	William Shakespeare
2001	Hamlet	William Shakespeare
2001	Forever Plaid	Stuart Ross James Raitt
2001	The Complete Works of William Shakespeare (Abridged)	Adam Long Daniel Singer Jess Winfield
2002	Much Ado About Nothing	William Shakespeare
2002	Arms and The Man	George Bernard Shaw
2002	Twelfth Night	William Shakespeare
2002	Macbeth	William Shakespeare
2002	You're a Good Man, Charlie Brown	Clark Gesner Charles M. Schultz
2003	The Importance of Being Earnest	Oscar Wilde
2003	A Midsummer Night's Dream	William Shakespeare
2003	The Comedy of Errors	William Shakespeare
2003	Henry V	William Shakespeare
2003	The Fantasticks	Tom Jones Harvey Schmidt
2004	The Importance of Being Earnest	Oscar Wilde
2004	As You Like It	William Shakespeare
2004	The Merry Wives of Windsor	William Shakespeare
2004	Julius Caesar	William Shakespeare
2004	I Love You, You're Perfect, Now Change	Joe DiPietro Jimmy Roberts
2005	The Taming of the Shrew	William Shakespeare
2005	She Stoops to Conquer	Oliver Goldsmith
2005	A Funny Thing Happened on the Way to the Forum	Bert Shevelove & Larry Gelbart Stephen Sondheim
2005	King Lear	William Shakespeare
2005	The Complete Works of William Shakespeare (Abridged)	Adam Long Daniel Singer Jess Winfield
2005	I Am My Own Wife	Doug Wright
2006	A Funny Thing Happened on the Way to the Forum	Bert Shevelove & Larry Gelbart Stephen Sondheim
2006	Love's Labor's Lost	William Shakespeare
2006	Major Barbara	George Bernard Shaw
2006	Romeo and Juliet	William Shakespeare
2006	The Spitfire Grill	James Valcq Fred Alley Lee David Zlotoff
2007	Hay Fever	Noël Coward
2007	The Tempest	William Shakespeare
2007	Arsenic and Old Lace	Joseph Kesselring
2007	Measure for Measure	William Shakespeare
2007	Little Shop of Horrors	Howard Ashman Alan Menken
2008	All's Well that Ends Well	William Shakespeare
2008	The Crucible	Arthur Miller
2008	Into the Woods	James Lapine Stephen Sondheim
2008	Macbeth	William Shakespeare
2008	Greater Tuna	Jaston Williams Joe Sears Ed Howard
2009	The Comedy of Errors	William Shakespeare
2009	The Seagull	Anton Chekhov
2009	The Mystery of Edwin Drood	Rupert Holmes
2009	Twelfth Night	William Shakespeare
2009	A Tuna Christmas	Jaston Williams Joe Sears Ed Howard

=== The 2010s ===
This decade saw changes in leadership that brought new customs to the season construction. The "season musical", which had previously been performed in the fall, is now produced for the duration of the season. In addition, a slot has been specifically allotted to a murder mystery.

ISF Production History: 2010-2019
Year	Play	Playwright	Director
2010	A Midsummer Night's Dream	William Shakespeare	
2010	Bat Boy: The Musical	Keythe Farley Brian Flemming Laurence O'Keefe	
2010	An Ideal Husband	Oscar Wilde	
2010	Othello	William Shakespeare	
2010	The Woman in Black	Stephen Mallatratt Susan Hill	
2011	The Two Gentlemen of Verona	William Shakespeare	
2011	The Complete Works of William Shakespeare (Abridged)	Adam Long Daniel Singer Jess Winfield	
2011	Cabaret	Joe Masterof John Van Druten Christopher Isherwood John Kander, Fred Ebb	
2011	The Taming of the Shrew	William Shakespeare	
2011	Alfred Hitchcock's The 39 Steps	Alfred Hitchcock John Buchan Patrick Barlow (adapter)	
2012	Romeo and Juliet	William Shakespeare	Charles Fee
2012	The Mousetrap	Agatha Christie	Drew Barr
2012	The Imaginary Invalid	Molière adapted by Oded Gross & Tracy Young	Tracy Young
2012	The Winter's Tale	William Shakespeare	Jesse Berger
2012	Noises Off	Michael Frayn	Gordon Reinhart
2013	Blithe Spirit	Noël Coward	Charles Fee
2013	Much Ado About Nothing	William Shakespeare	Sharon Ott
2013	Sweeney Todd: The Demon Barber of Fleet Street	Stephen Sondheim Hugh Wheeler	Victoria Bussert
2013	King Richard III	William Shakespeare	Joseph Hanreddy
2013	The Foreigner	Larry Shue	Sari Ketter
2014	Deathtrap	Ira Levin	Charles Fee
2014	As You Like It	William Shakespeare	Edward Morgan
2014	Les Misérables	Alain Boublil Claude-Michel Schönberg Herbert Kretzmer	Victoria Bussert
2014	The Merry Wives of Windsor	William Shakespeare	Tracy Young
2014	Steel Magnolias	Robert Harling	Sari Ketter
2015	Dial "M" for Murder	Frederick Knott	Charles Fee
2015	The Tempest	William Shakespeare	Drew Barr
2015	The Secret Garden	Marsha Norman Lucy Simon Frances Hodgson Burnett	Victoria Bussert
2015	King Lear	William Shakespeare	Joseph Hanreddy
2015	The Fantasticks	Tom Jones Harvey Schmidt	Victoria Bussert
2016	And Then There Were None	Agatha Christie	Charles Fee
2016	Love's Labor's Lost	William Shakespeare	Tyne Rafaeli
2016	My Fair Lady	Alan Jay Lerner Frederick Lowe	Victoria Bussert
2016	Twelfth Night	William Shakespeare	Drew Barr
2016	Forever Plaid	Stuart Ross James Raitt	Victoria Bussert
2017	Wait Until Dark	Frederick Knott	Joseph Hanreddy
2017	Hamlet	William Shakespeare	Charles Fee
2017	Disney's The Hunchback of Notre Dame	Alan Menken Stephen Schwartz Peter Barnell Victor Hugo	Victoria Bussert
2017	A Midsummer Night's Dream	William Shakespeare	Joseph Hanreddy
2017	The Hound of the Baskervilles	Sir Arthur Conan Doyle Steven Canny (adapter) John Nicholson (adapter)	Charles Fee
2018	Misery	William Goldman Stephen King	Charles Fee
2018	Macbeth	William Shakespeare	Charles Fee
2018	Mamma Mia!	Benny Andersson Björn Ulvaeus Stig Anderson Catherine Johnson	Victoria Bussert
2018	Pride and Prejudice	Jane Austen Joseph Hanreddy (adapter) J. R. Sullivan (adapter)	Joseph Hanreddy
2018	Beehive: The 60's Musical	Larry Gallagher	Victoria Bussert
2019	The Taming of the Shrew	William Shakespeare	Sara Bruner
2019	Witness for the Prosecution	Agatha Christie	Charles Fee
2019	The Music Man	Meredith Willson Franklin Lacey	Victoria Bussert
2019	Julius Caesar	William Shakespeare	Sara Bruner
2019	Million Dollar Quartet	Colin Escott Floyd Mutrux	Hunter Foster

=== The 2020s ===
Due to the COVID-19 Pandemic, the 2020 season, which was set to include Much Ado About Nothing, Ain't Misbehavin', Henry V, Emma, and Sleuth, was cancelled.

== Cumulative Shakespeare Canon Productions ==
A list of the number of times the Idaho Shakespeare Festival has produced each of Shakespeare's plays is available below. The Festival has produced A Midsummer Night's Dream the most. There are nine plays in the full Shakespeare Canon that have never been produced by the Idaho Shakespeare Festival.

Play	Number of Productions	Seasons
A Midsummer Night's Dream	9	1977, 1982, 1986, 1993, 1998, 1999, 2003, 2010, 2017
The Taming of the Shrew	7	1980, 1984, 1992, 1997, 2005, 2011, 2019
Macbeth	6	1988, 1991, 1997, 2002, 2008, 2018
Twelfth Night	6	1982, 1991, 1996, 2002, 2009, 2016
The Merry Wives of Windsor	6	1979, 1983, 1990, 1996, 2004, 2014
As You Like It	6	1981, (1983), 1988, 1994, 2004, 2014
Much Ado About Nothing	6	1981, 1989, 1994, 2001, 2002, 2013
Romeo and Juliet	6	1979, 1987, 1992, 1998, 2006, 2011
The Two Gentlemen of Verona	6	1978, 1985, 1995, 2000, 2001, 2011
The Tempest	5	1981, 1991, 1996, 2007, 2015
The Comedy of Errors	5	1980, 1987, 1993, 2003, 2009
Love's Labour's Lost	4	1983, 1995, 2006, 2016
Julius Caesar	3	1994, 2004, 2019
Hamlet	3	1982, 2001, 2017
King Lear	3	1984, 2005, 2015
Richard III	3	1985, 1992, 2013
The Winter's Tale	3	1985, 1999, 2011
Othello	3	1986, 2000, 2010
The Merchant of Venice	3	1980, 1990, 1997
All's Well That Ends Well	2	1986, 2008
Measure for Measure	2	1988, 2007
Henry IV, Part 1	2	1983, 1995
Titus Andronicus	2	1988, 1999
Henry V	1	2003
Cymbeline	1	1998
Henry IV, Part 2	1	1995
Henry VIII	1	1990
Richard II	1	1989
Troilus and Cressida	1	1989
Pericles, Prince of Tyre*	1	1987
Antony and Cleopatra		
Coriolanus		
Edward III*		
Henry VI, Part 1		
Henry VI, Part 2		
Henry VI, Part 3		
King John		
Timon of Athens		
The Two Noble Kinsmen*		

*indicates shows not part of the First Folio canon.
