= Colorado Shakespeare Festival =

Shakespeare festival in Boulder, Colorado

Coordinates: 40.007190°N 105.272780°W

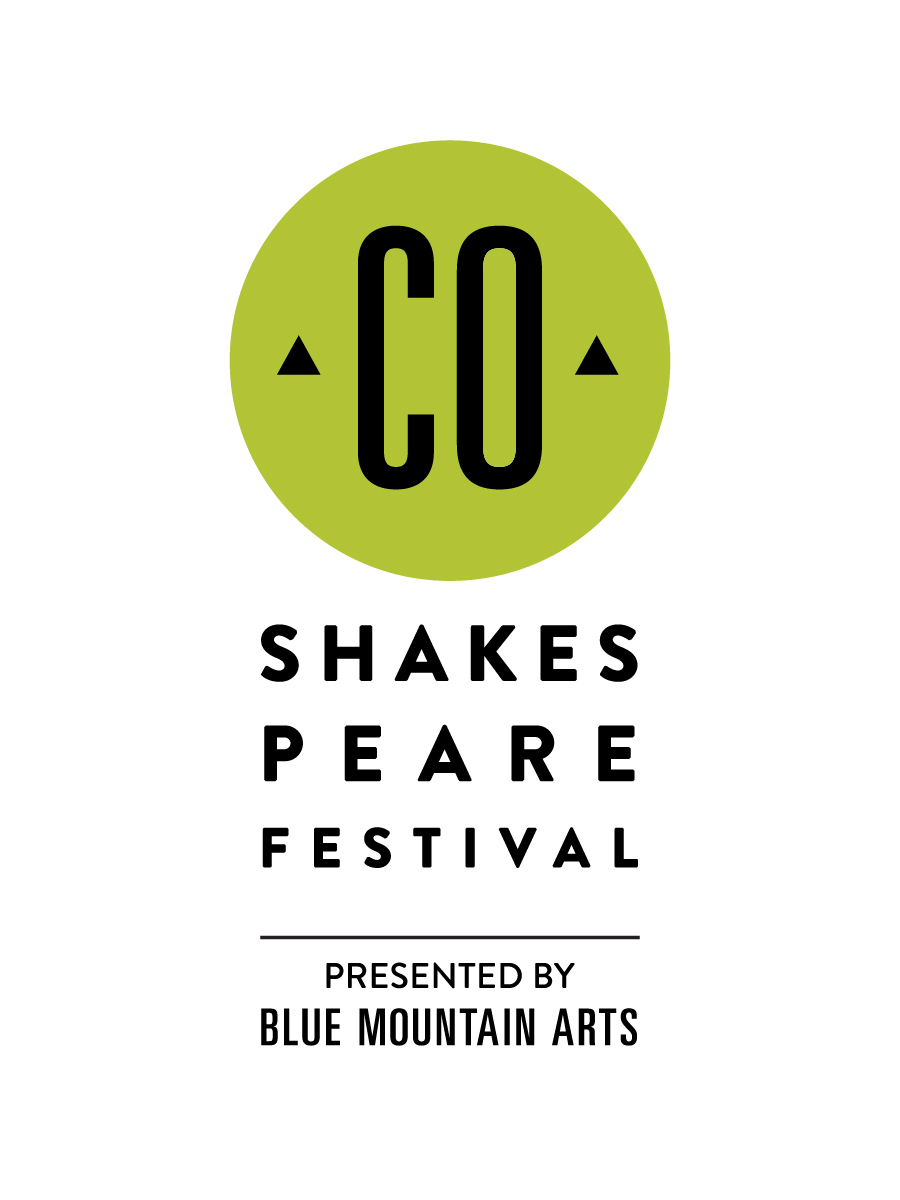
- Location: University of Colorado Boulder
- Founded: 1958
- Artistic director: Timothy Orr (2014)
- Type of plays: Shakespeare, classics and contemporary works
- Festival date: Annually, June through August
- Website: www.coloradoshakes.org

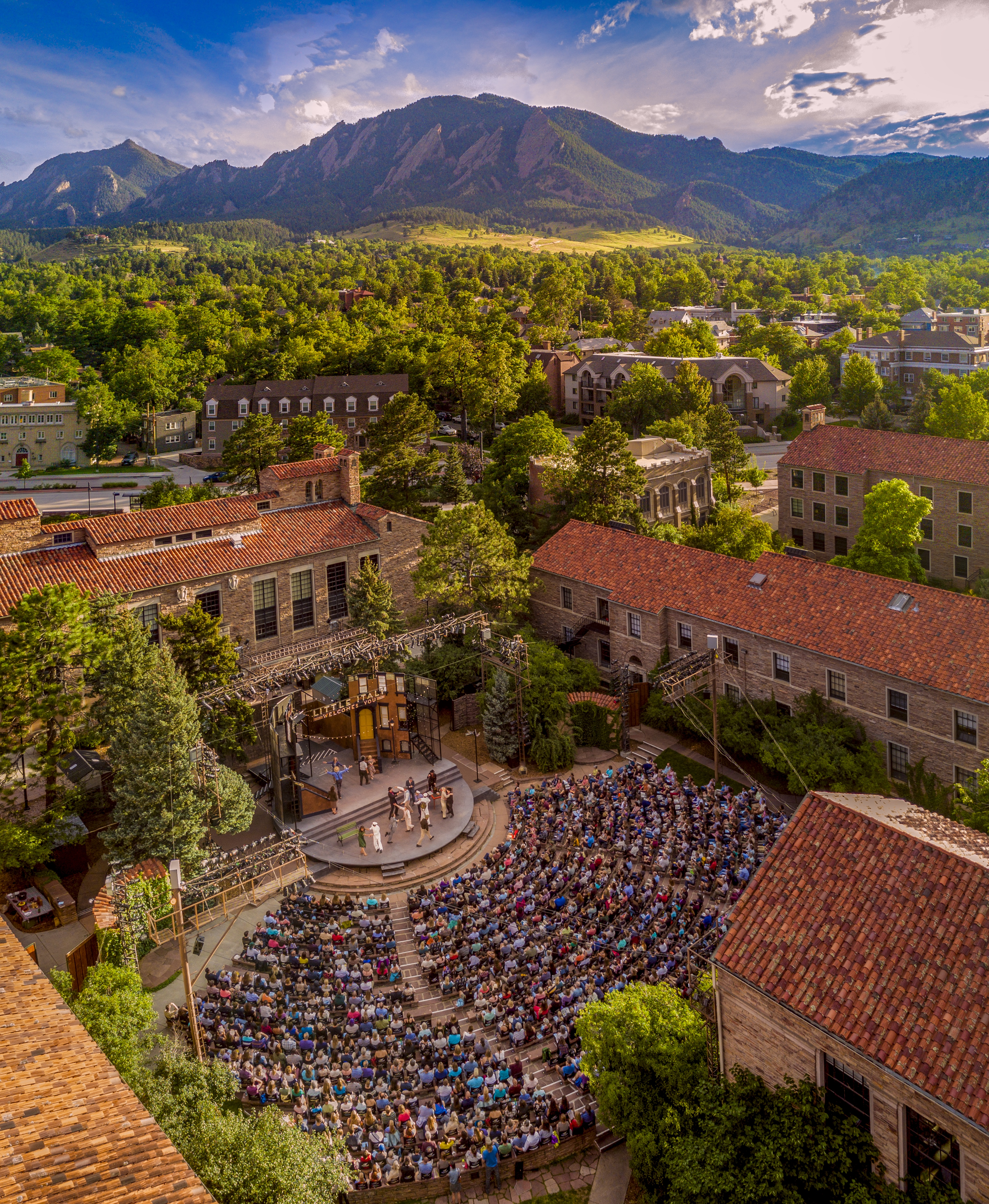
Mary Rippon Outdoor Theatre

The Colorado Shakespeare Festival is a professional acting company in association with the University of Colorado at Boulder. It was established in 1958, making it one of the oldest such festivals in the United States, and has roots going back to the early 1900s.

Each summer, the festival draws about 25,000 patrons to see the works of Shakespeare, as well as classics and contemporary plays, in the Mary Rippon Outdoor Theatre and indoor University Theatre.

The company is made up of professional actors, directors, designers and artisans from around the United States and the world, along with student interns from around the nation.

Timothy Orr, the current producing artistic director, was hired in 2014 after serving as an actor in the company since 2007 and associate producing artistic director since 2011.

In early April 2020, with the uncertainty of the ongoing worldwide COVID-19 pandemic, CSF cancelled the summer 2020 season altogether. It resumed in 2022. In 2023, renovations to the Mary Rippon Outdoor Theater were announced.

== History ==
=== 1870s–1944 ===
The festival has roots in the earliest days of the University of Colorado at Boulder, when senior classes performed commencement plays under a grove of cottonwood trees planted in the 1870s on the east lawn of the first building on campus, Old Main.

When electric lights became available in 1901, the university began to stage evening performances. The tradition was interrupted by World War I and resumed in 1919 by George F. Reynolds, an Elizabethan theater scholar and professor of English Literature.

In 1936, Reynolds helped develop plans to build the Mary Rippon Outdoor Theatre. Rippon (1850–1935) was the first female professor at the university and is believed to have been the first woman in the United States to teach at a state university. She was chair of the Department of Germanic Languages and Literature and also served, without financial compensation, as Dean of Women.

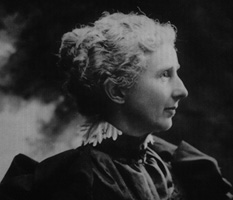
Mary Rippon, 1899. CU Heritage Center.

After her death, University President George Norlin suggested that a planned outdoor theater be named in Rippon's honor. Construction began in 1936 with funding from the Board of Regents and the federal Works Progress Administration, as well as private donations. "Alumni Day" celebrations were held in the still-incomplete theater on June 13, 1936.

The Mary Rippon Outdoor Theatre was officially completed in 1939, but no plays were staged there until 1944, when book reviewer, Shakespeare scholar and associate director of libraries in charge of acquisitions James Sandoe was asked to direct a play. Because the University Theatre was occupied by the Department of the Navy due to the war effort, Sandoe, also influential in developing the Oregon Shakespeare Festival, decided to stage Romeo and Juliet in the outdoor theater. The event was so popular that it was followed by The Merchant of Venice in 1945 and Henry IV, Part I in 1946.

Sandoe directed nine seasons for CSF between 1961 and 1973. No director helmed more productions until Department of Theatre and Dance professor James Symons pushed the mark to 11 in recent years. However, no one to date—70 years later—has directed more productions of Shakespeare's plays on the Mary Rippon stage. All four of Sandoe's children appeared in the CSF; son Sam Sandoe and daughter Anne Sandoe continue to act in the festival each summer.

=== 1940s to 1960s ===
James Sandoe and Jack Crouch, professor in the Department of English and Speech and head of CU's Creative Arts Festival, began to discuss the possibility of creating an annual Shakespeare festival on campus. Crouch took over in 1947, after which Shakespeare plays were performed in the Rippon theater every year except for 1957, when the annual production was staged in the indoor University Theater. Crouch directed seven plays over the next 10 years and founded the Colorado Shakespeare Festival, which premiered on Aug. 2, 1958, and featured three productions: Julius Caesar, Hamlet, and The Taming of the Shrew. More than 7,000 patrons attended 13 performances that year, paying $1.50 per ticket. The following year, more than 13,000 people attended.

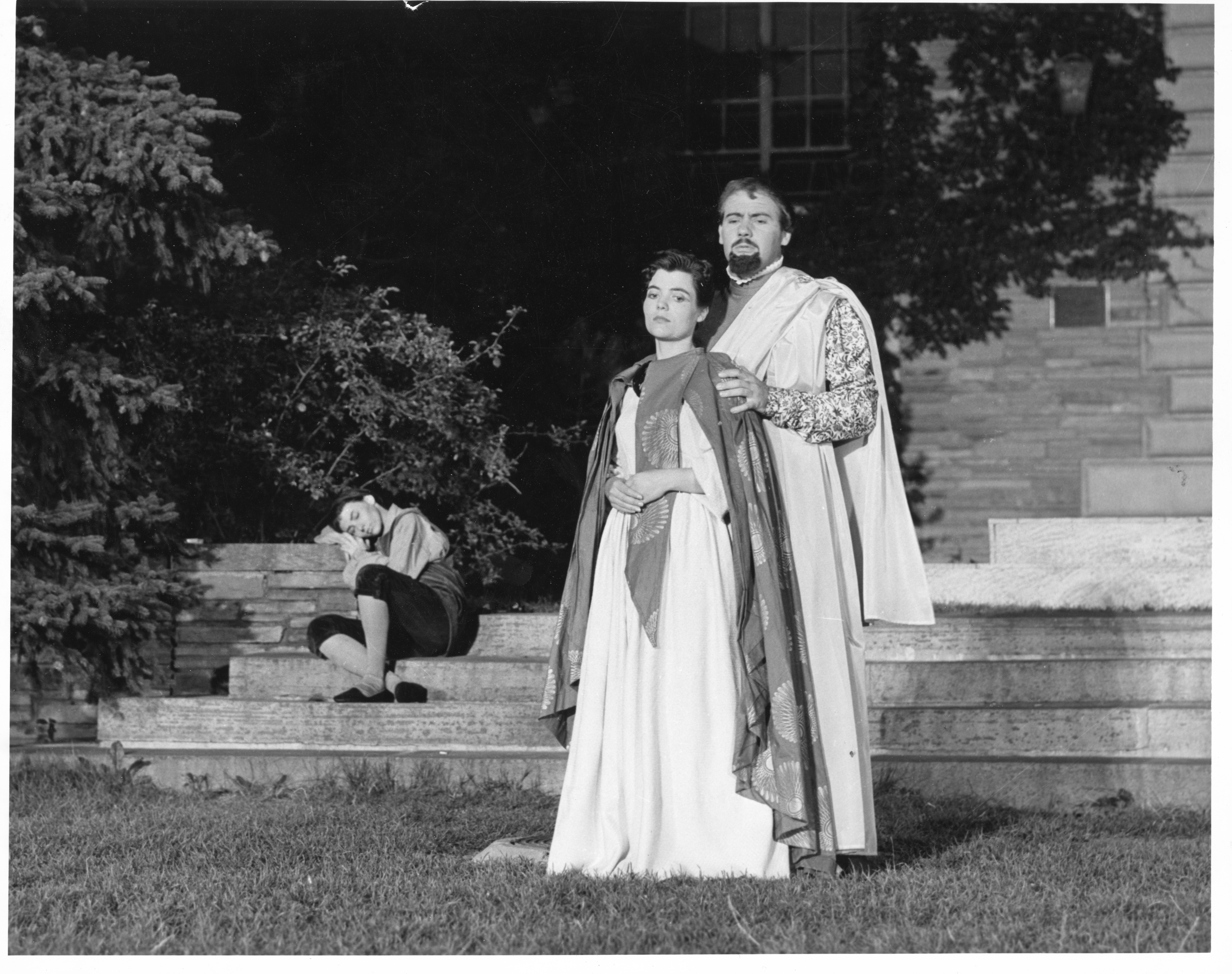
Julius Caesar, 1958

By the end of its first decade, CSF had produced 26 of the 37 plays in the canon, with only one duplication, Hamlet in 1965. Howard M. Banks' production of Henry V was filmed for television in 1961.

Crouch stepped down as executive director after the 1963 season but remained active in the festival through the 1980s. CSF directors since 1963 have been Albert Nadeau (1964–1966), Richard Knaub (1967–1976), Martin Cobin (1982–1985), Daniel S.P. Yang (1978–1981; 1986–1989), Dick Devin (1990–1994; 1997–2004), Jim Symons (1995), Philip Sneed (2007–2012) and Timothy Orr (2013–present).

Prominent CSF alumni include Michael Moriarty (1962), Barry Corbin (1962), Karen Grassle (1964), Barry Kraft, Joe Spano (1968), Annette Bening (1980), Jimmy Smits and Val Kilmer (1988) Peter Macon (2014), and Ellen McLaughlin (2023).

=== 1970s ===
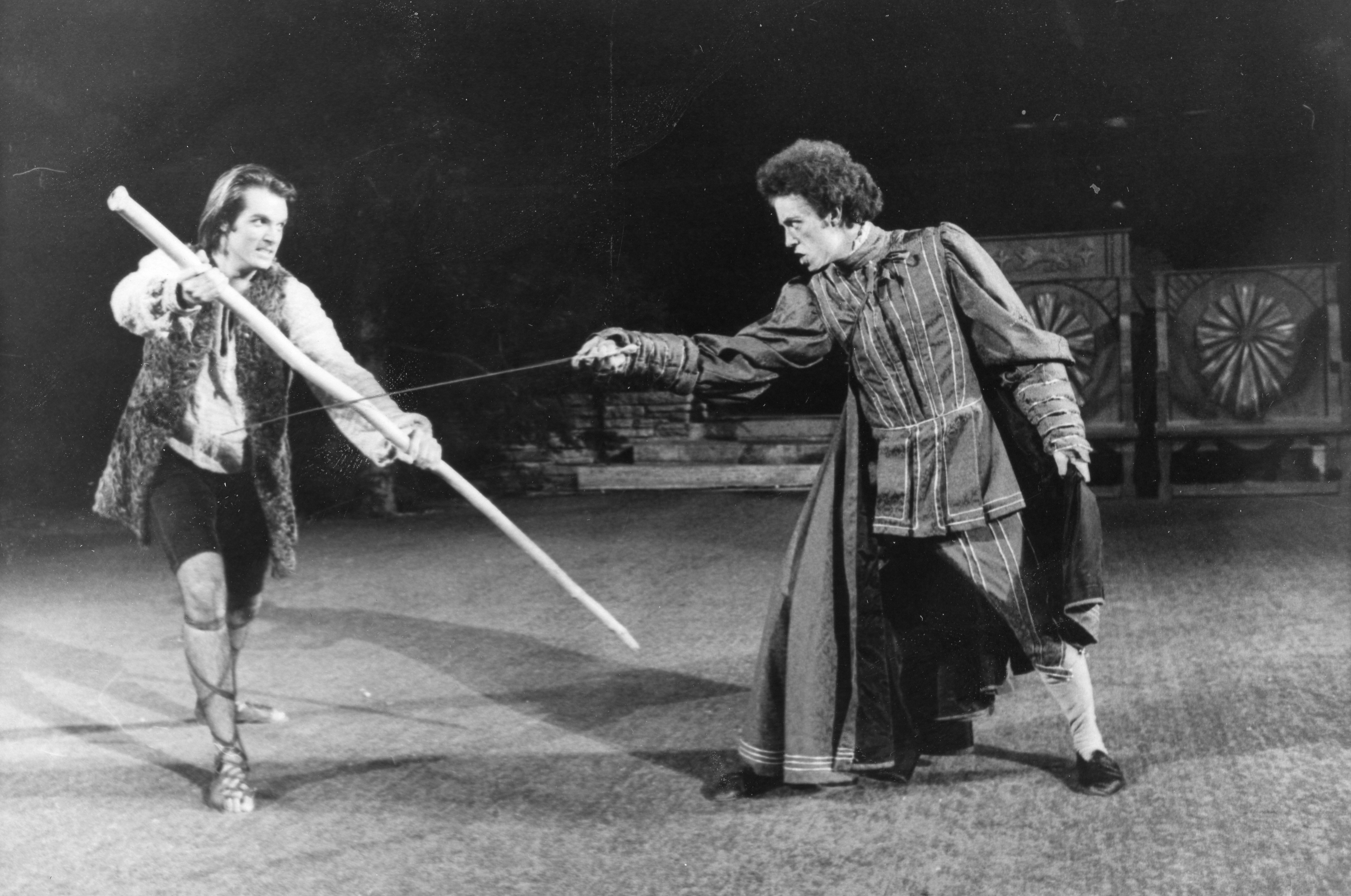
Cymbeline, 1975

The Rippon theater was used through 1966 as originally built—a three-level stage facing an open amphitheater with sandstone benches seating for about 2,000 patrons. In 1967, the university funded construction of stone walkways and forestage, and constructed two large light towers in 1968. Through the years, the Rippon theater has been continually altered and improved. In 1981 Yang hired Richard Devin to make the Rippon space more theatrical and to create more lighting areas on the stage.

In 1975, with a production of Cymbeline, CSF became one of seven companies in the world and the second American university (after the University of Michigan) to perform Shakespeare's complete canon. That year the festival also produced a staged reading of The Two Noble Kinsmen, attributed to Shakespeare and John Fletcher, and Ben Jonson's Volpone, the festival's only non-Shakespeare production until 1991.

In 1978, CSF inaugurated its Young People's Shakespeare program, which performed an abbreviated versions of Twelfth Night around the Boulder community. The program morphed into a program offering internships to high school students. In 1982, CSF began its Dramaturg Program, recruiting CU doctoral students to research productions. In 1976 the festival launched CSF Annual (later renamed On-Stage Studies) a scholarly journal, under the editorship of Cobin.

=== 1980s ===
Under Yang, the festival began hiring professional designers, technicians and directors with national reputations, including Robert Benedetti, Audrey Stanley and Tom Markus. Yang also hired graduate students from around the country, moving beyond the confines of CU-Boulder, and in 1982 hired the first Equity actor under a "guest artist contract".

With such changes, CSF's reputation began to grow. Shakespeare Quarterly remarked that the festival "had stepped out of its academic cocoon" in its Summer 1980 issue and in 1989 praised its experimentation, from "Hamlet in outer space, to topless witches in Macbeth, to a commedia dell'arte Shrew." In 1992, CSF was named as one of the top Shakespeare festivals in the nation by Time. That same year, the Festival received the Colorado Governor's Award for Excellence in the Arts and the Denver Drama Critic's Circle Award for "Best Season for a Theatre Company".

=== 1990s ===
Dick Devin, who started working at the CSF as a lighting designer in 1981, and done design work in Hong Kong, Tokyo and Cairo, was selected as the festival's producing artistic director nine years later.

Under Devin in the 1990s and 2000s, CSF bumped the number of annual summer productions from three to four, with occasional forays into non-Shakespeare or related material, such as Tom Stoppard's Rosencrantz and Guildenstern Are Dead in 1995 and Molière's The Miser in 1996.

Among Devin's innovations was a program that offered free tickets to productions by other companies with the purchase of a season subscription. In 2003, for instance, those who bought CSF subscriptions also received tickets to productions at the Denver Center, Nomad Theatre, Denver's Curious Theatre, the Colorado Music Festival and the University of Colorado Concerts series.

In 2010, Devin was named an Honorary Lifetime Member Award by the U.S. Institute for Theatre Technology Inc., of which he had served as president.

The festival began to experience budget shortfalls, which were periodically covered by the College of Arts and Sciences. Devin cited funding challenges as one reason he decided to step down: "After 17 years of trying to find a half million dollars a year, it gets to be a struggle to get up and make it happen every year. That's the principal reason," he told the Daily Camera.

=== 2000s and 2010s ===
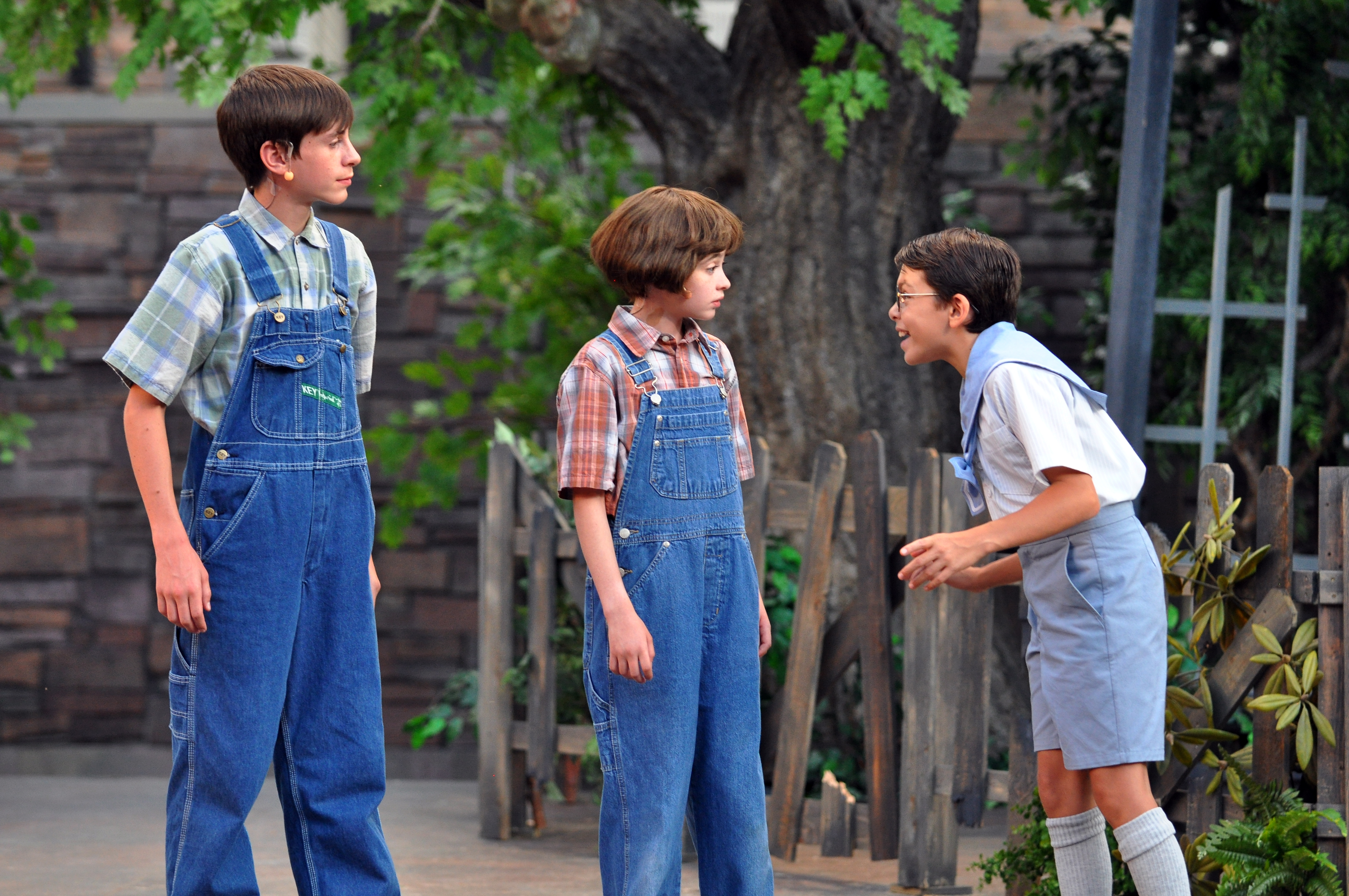
To Kill a Mockingbird, 2009

With the arrival of Philip Sneed in 2006, CSF began producing six plays each year, including non-Shakespeare works such as Woody Guthrie's American Song (2008) and To Kill a Mockingbird (2009). To Kill a Mockingbird was widely praised by critics and earned a prestigious Ovation Award from The Denver Post for its director, Jane Page. Sneed was a CU-Boulder graduate and former CSF actor who came to the festival after serving as director of the Foothill Theatre Company in Nevada City, California.

Sneed was seen as willing to experiment. He invited Tina Packer, founder of Shakespeare & Company, to present her five-part work, Women of Will, performed by Pack and Nigel Gore in 2011, and special performances of a condensed version in 2012. He also launched a plan to perform Shakespeare's Henriad—Richard II, Henry IV Part 1, Henry IV Part 2 and Henry V, over three seasons, 2013–15.

The festival also produced holiday shows from 2007 to 2011, including A Child's Christmas in Wales (2007–2008), A Christmas Carol (2009–2010) and It's a Wonderful Life (2011).

He also established a "cultural exchange" with the Maxim Gorky Theatre in Vladivostok, Russia. In 2011, CSF hosted Gorky director Efim Zyenyatsky and Russian actors for a bi-lingual production of Nikolai Gogol's The Inspector General. In October 2012, he traveled with frequent CSF actors Jamie Ann Romero and Geoffrey Kent to Vladivostok, where they performed in a bilingual version of Michael Frayn's Noises Off, which CSF had produced the previous summer.

=== Financial difficulties and restructuring ===
On June 19, 2011 the Daily Camera reported that the festival was restructuring after accumulating a $950,000 shortfall over the previous three seasons of Sneed's leadership, citing university and festival officials who said the economic downturn, weather and concerns about West Nile virus had negatively affected revenue. The festival had sought to halt the mounting losses by cutting rehearsal time, staff and payroll, and reducing the number of outdoor performances, even while continuing to emphasize innovation.

On July 5, 2012, the college announced that just-retired Dean Todd Gleeson had "relieved the Colorado Shakespeare Festival of its obligation to repay a shortfall of $984,889" in order to "remove a distraction" for Steven Leigh, who began his tenure as dean on July 1, 2012.

Under pressure from the university's Board of Regents, the college had initiated a restructuring in 2011, shifting some responsibilities from the director to new accounting and associate producing director positions and creating a new executive board to "share management responsibilities" with the director.

In addition, in November 2012, CSF's box-office, marketing and communications functions were integrated, along with those of the CU-Boulder Department of Theatre and Dance, into CU Presents, a program of the College of Music that provides those services for other ticketed events on campus, including the Artist Series, Takács Quartet and Holiday Festival. The change, directed by campus Provost Russ Moore, was intended to improve efficiency while increasing visibility and revenue.

=== 2013 ===
On Jan. 14, 2013, Sneed announced that he was leaving CSF to take a position as executive director for the Arvada (Colorado) Center for Arts and Humanities. Associate Producing Artistic Director Timothy Orr was tapped as the interim director.

The 2013 season—A Midsummer Night's Dream, Macbeth, The Complete Works of William Shakespeare, Abridged, Richard II and Women of Will: The Overview—saw a 17-percent increase in ticket revenue, which allowed the festival to pay off loans for capital improvements to the Rippon theater and make a voluntary contribution to the college in an effort to repay debt underwriting. The festival was bucking a trend, which had seen the collapse of two prominent Shakespeare programs, Santa Cruz (which has announced it will be resurrected in 2015 and the North Carolina Shakespeare Festival, over the previous year.

The season also drew critical praise, particularly for Geoffrey Kent's unconventional production of Midsummer. "The performers provide moments of comedy, insight or pure delight," wrote Denver's Westword. Former Denver Post theater critic John Moore, now associate director of content strategy for the Denver Center for the Performing Arts, declared, "In the summer of 2013, the Colorado Shakespeare Festival is a mover and a shaker."

=== 2014–2015 ===
Following a national search, the College of Arts and Sciences announced on April 11, 2014 that it had named interim director Orr as producing artistic director. As interim director, Orr oversaw planning for the upcoming season, which included The Tempest, The Merry Wives of Windsor, I Hate Hamlet, Paul Rudnick's comedy about a young actor haunted by the ghost of Shakespearean actor John Barrymore, Henry IV, Part 1 and two "original practices" performances of Henry IV, Part 2.

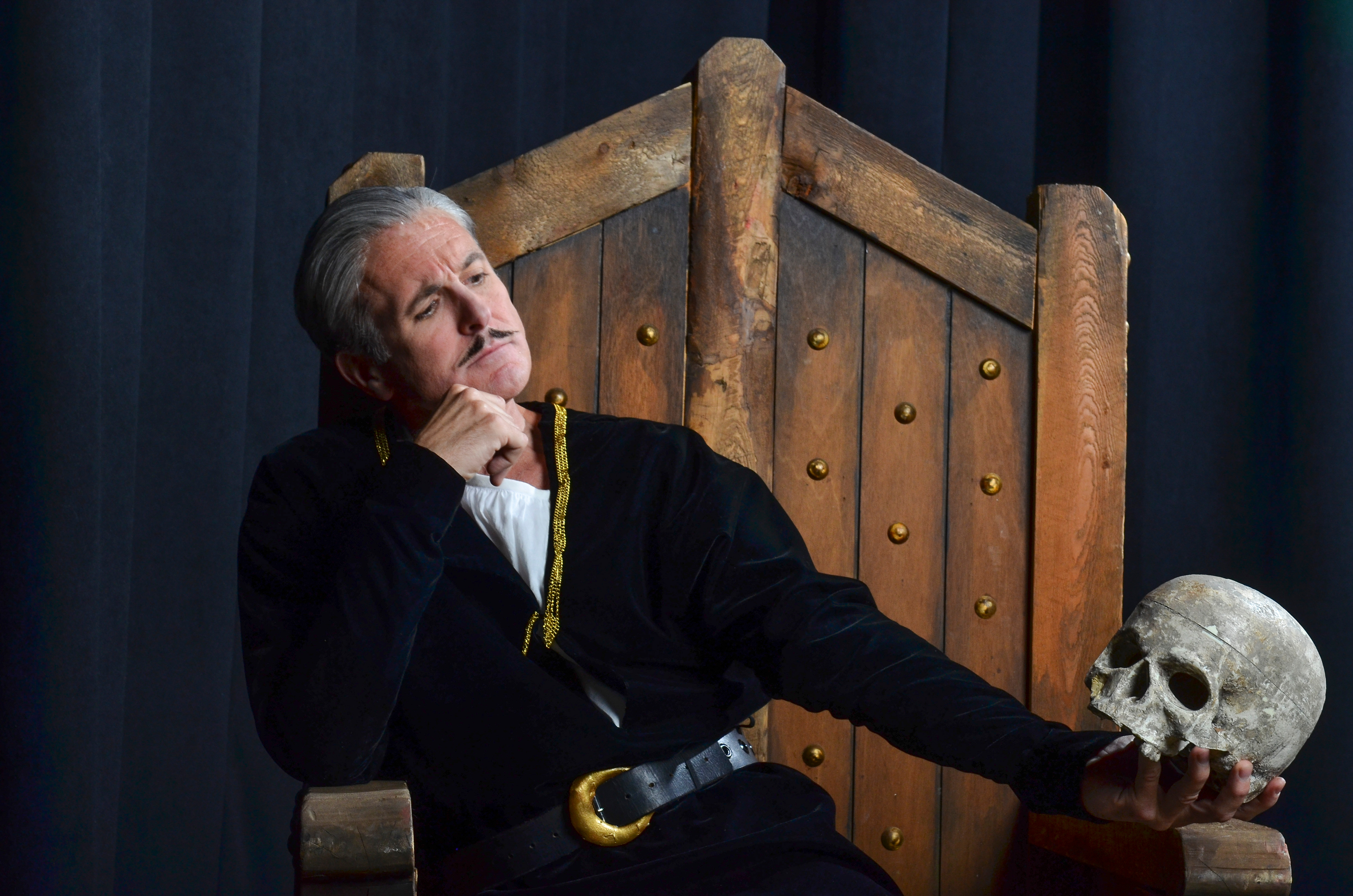
I Hate Hamlet, 2014

The 2014 season was well received by critics, particularly I Hate Hamlet, starring veteran Denver Center for the Performing Arts actor Sam Gregory as Barrymore—"An absurdly magnificent turn makes 'I Hate Hamlet' lovable," wrote The Denver Post. Critics also praised the sold-out performances of Henry IV, Part 2 using original practices, which aim to recreate the staging, rehearsal and performance conditions of Elizabethan England. “The verisimilitude to original practices is delightful,” wrote coloradodrama.com.

While researching I Hate Hamlet, CU-Boulder theater graduate student Roxxy Duda stumbled upon a large, all-but-forgotten archive of Barrymore materials—letters, photographs, personal items including the contents of his wallet at death, and more. The actor had no association with the university, but had willed the materials to his friend, theater critic Gene Fowler, a Denver native who wrote a biography of Barrymore, Goodnight, Sweet Prince.

The 2014 season was also a box-office success, as CSF topped $800,000 in ticket sales for the first time.

In November 2014 CSF announced its 2015 summer lineup. On the outdoor stage were Much Ado About Nothing and Othello, with Emmy Award-winning stage, TV and film actor Peter Macon in the title role. On the indoor stage, the regional premier of David Davalos's comedy Wittenberg, which pits Martin Luther and Dr. Faustus in a battle of wills over their student, Hamlet, the final chapter of the Henriad, Henry V, and two "original practices" performances of Henry VI, Part 1.

In 2015, Blue Mountain Arts celebrated 20 years as the festival's primary season sponsor with an insert in the program.

In 2017, the festival performed the second and third parts of Henry VI, completing the Shakespeare canon for the second time.

=== Plays from 1958 through 2022 ===
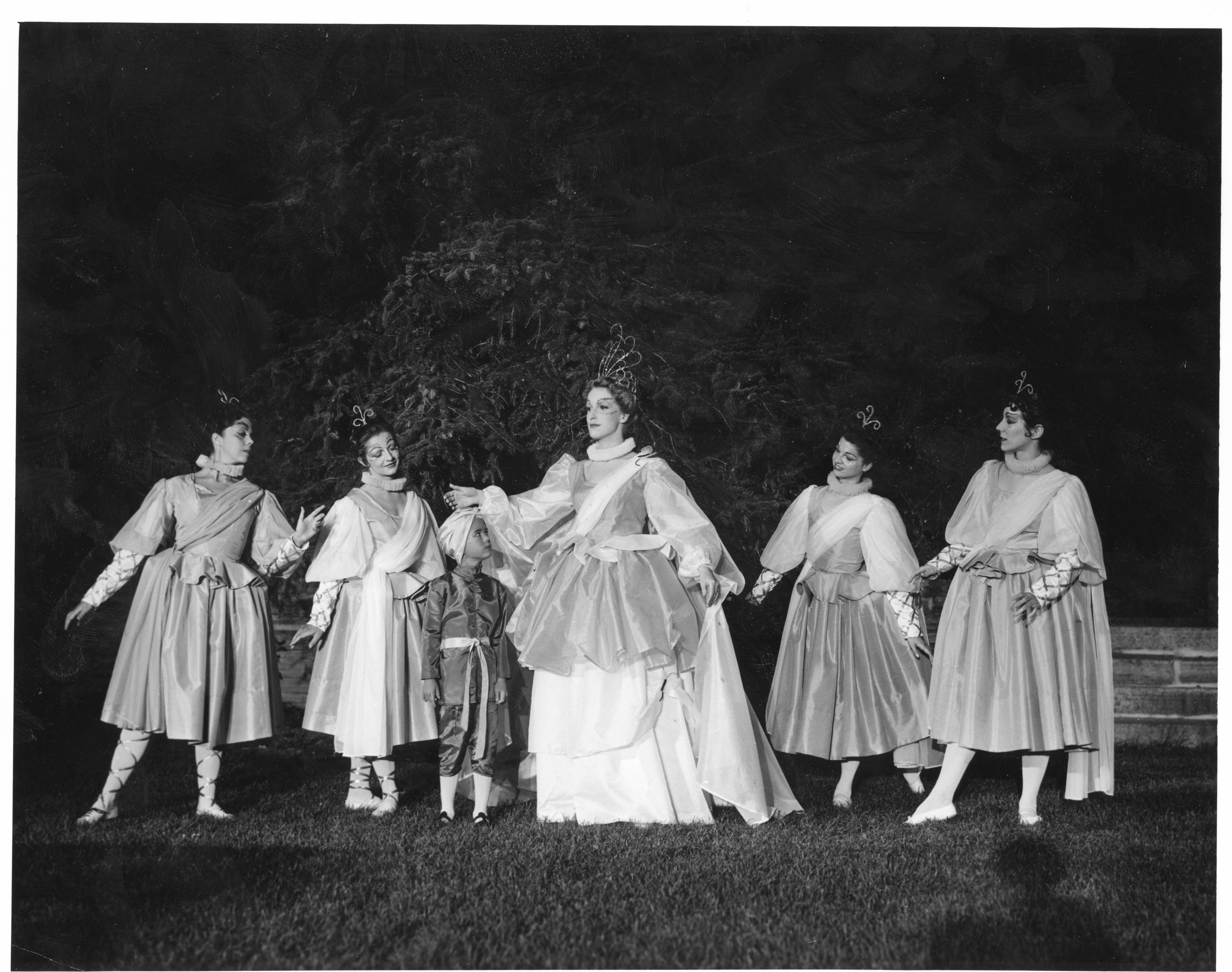
A Midsummer Night's Dream, 1959

1958 Hamlet, Julius Caesar, The Taming of the Shrew

1959 A Midsummer Night's Dream, Richard II, Macbeth

1960 Henry IV Part 1, Antony and Cleopatra, Twelfth Night

1961 Henry V, King Lear, Love's Labour's Lost

1962 Romeo and Juliet, The Comedy of Errors, Othello

1963 Measure for Measure, Richard III, Much Ado About Nothing

1964 As You Like It, King John, Troilus and Cressida

1965 Hamlet, The Tempest, Henry IV Part 2

1966 The Merchant of Venice, Coriolanus, The Merry Wives of Windsor

1967 A Midsummer Night's Dream, Henry VI Part 1, Titus Andronicus

1968 Macbeth, The Two Gentlemen of Verona, Henry VI Part 2

1969 Romeo and Juliet, The Taming of the Shrew, Henry VI Part 3

1970 Othello, Richard III, All's Well That Ends Well

1971 King Lear, Henry VIII, Love's Labour's Lost

1972 Ben Jonson's Volpone, Antony and Cleopatra, The Winter's Tale

1973 Twelfth Night, Hamlet, Pericles

1974 Macbeth, A Midsummer Night's Dream, Timon of Athens

1975 Cymbeline, As You Like It, Romeo and Juliet

1976 The Comedy of Errors, The Tempest, King John

1977 Much Ado About Nothing, The Merchant of Venice, Richard II

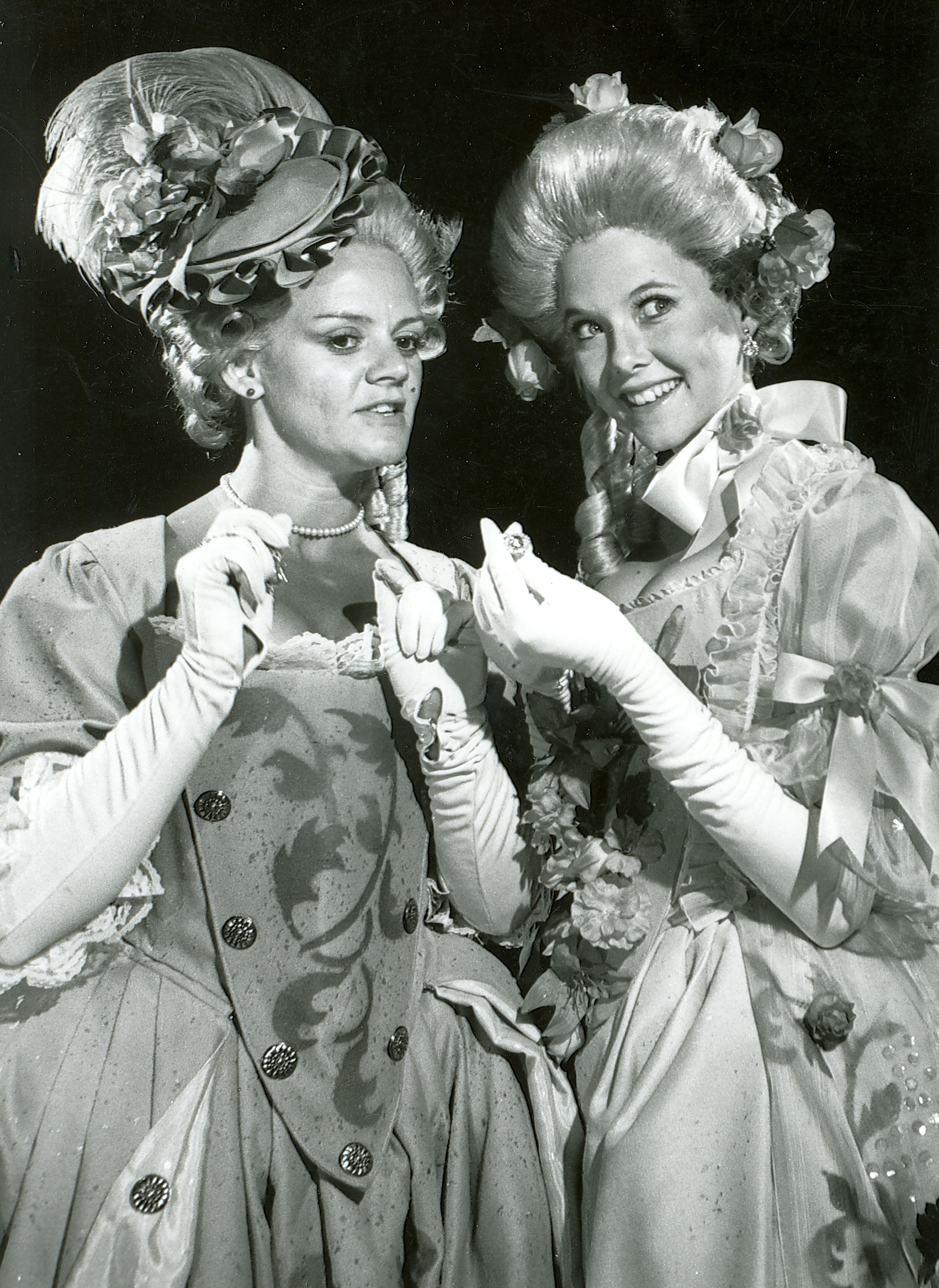
Love's Labour's Lost, 1980

1978 Twelfth Night, Othello, Henry IV Part 1

1979 A Midsummer Night's Dream, King Lear, Henry IV Part 2

1980 Love's Labour's Lost, Hamlet, Henry V

1981 The Taming of the Shrew, Julius Caesar, All's Well That Ends Well

1982 Macbeth, As You Like It, The Winter's Tale

1983 Richard III, Measure for Measure, The Comedy of Errors

1984 Twelfth Night, Richard II, Othello

1985 Antony & Cleopatra, The Merry Wives of Windsor, Romeo and Juliet

1986 King Lear, The Two Gentlemen of Verona, Henry IV Part 1

1987 The Tempest, Macbeth, The Merchant of Venice

1988 A Midsummer Night's Dream, Hamlet, Titus Andronicus

1989 The Taming of the Shrew, Othello, Love's Labour's Lost

1990 As You Like It, Romeo and Juliet, Much Ado About Nothing

1991 The Comedy of Errors, Julius Caesar, Richard III, Oscar Wilde's The Importance of Being Earnest

1992 All's Well That Ends Well, Henry V, The Winter's Tale, Richard Brinsley Sheridan's The Rivals

1993 The Merry Wives of Windsor, The Tempest, King Lear, Pericles

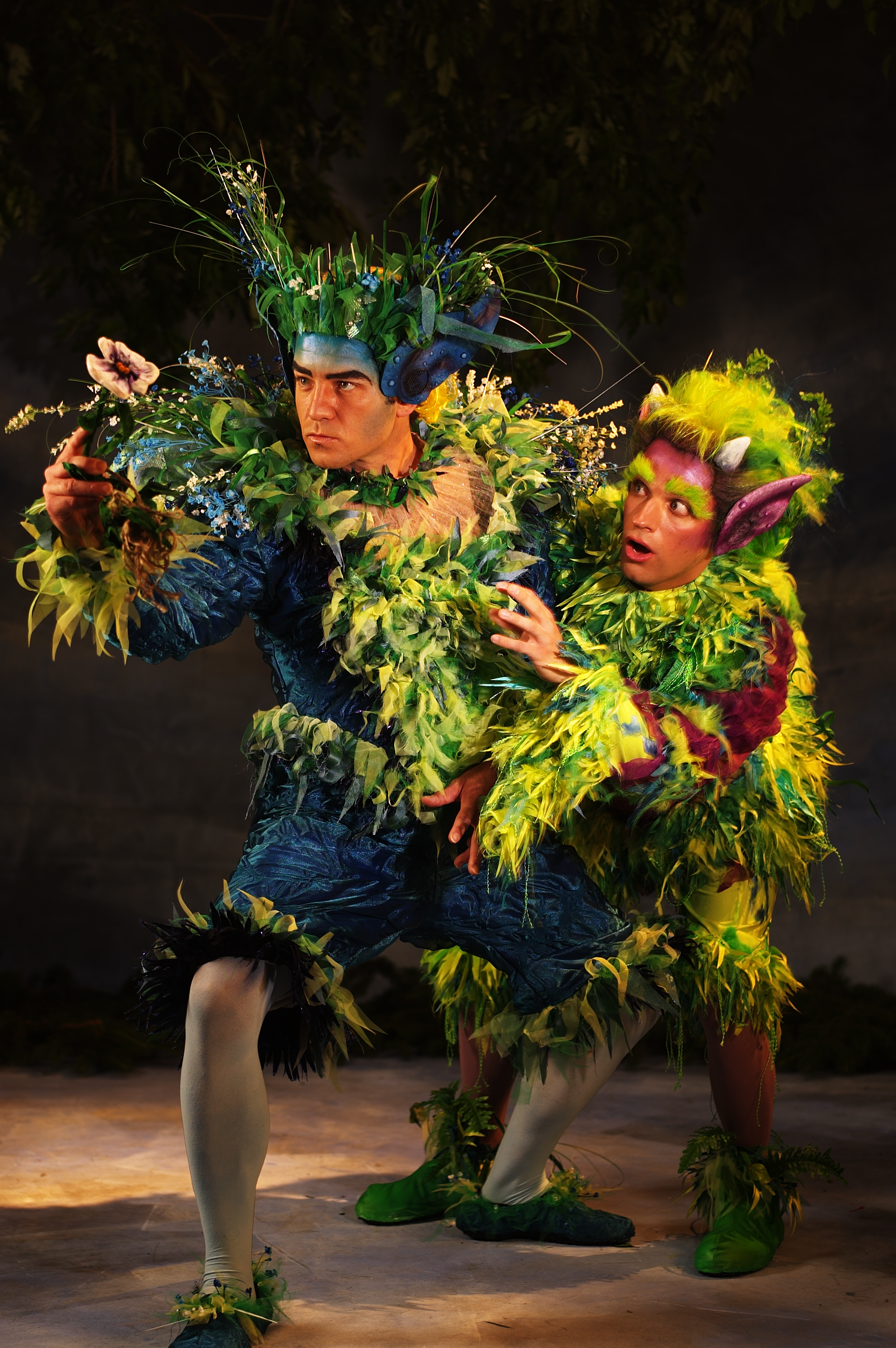
A Midsummer Night's Dream, 2002

1994 Macbeth, Antony and Cleopatra, Twelfth Night, The Two Gentlemen of Verona

1995 Hamlet, Coriolanus, As You Like It, Tom Stoppard's Rosencrantz and Guildenstern Are Dead

1996 A Midsummer Night's Dream, The Merchant of Venice, Othello, Molière's The Miser

1997 Troilus and Cressida, Romeo and Juliet, Much Ado About Nothing, Molière's The Would-Be Gentleman

1998* The Taming of the Shrew, Measure for Measure, Love's Labour's Lost, Richard II

1999* Henry IV Part 1, Henry IV Part 2, The Comedy of Errors, The Merry Wives of Windsor

2000 Twelfth Night, Julius Caesar, Henry V, The Tempest

2001* King Lear, The Two Gentlemen of Verona, As You Like It, Queen Margaret

2002* A Midsummer Night's Dream, Macbeth, Shakespeare in Briefs, Richard III

2003* Hamlet, The Taming of the Shrew, Much Ado About Nothing, Cymbeline

2004 The Comedy of Errors, Antony and Cleopatra, Romeo and Juliet

2005* The Winter's Tale, Twelfth Night, Othello

2006* The Tempest, As You Like It, The Merchant of Venice, Unexpected Shakespeare

2007* A Midsummer Night's Dream, Julius Caesar, All's Well That Ends Well, Carlo Goldoni's The Servant of Two Masters, Around the World in 80 Days

2008* Macbeth, The Three Musketeers, Henry VIII, Love's Labour's Lost, Peter Glazer's Woody Guthrie's American Song

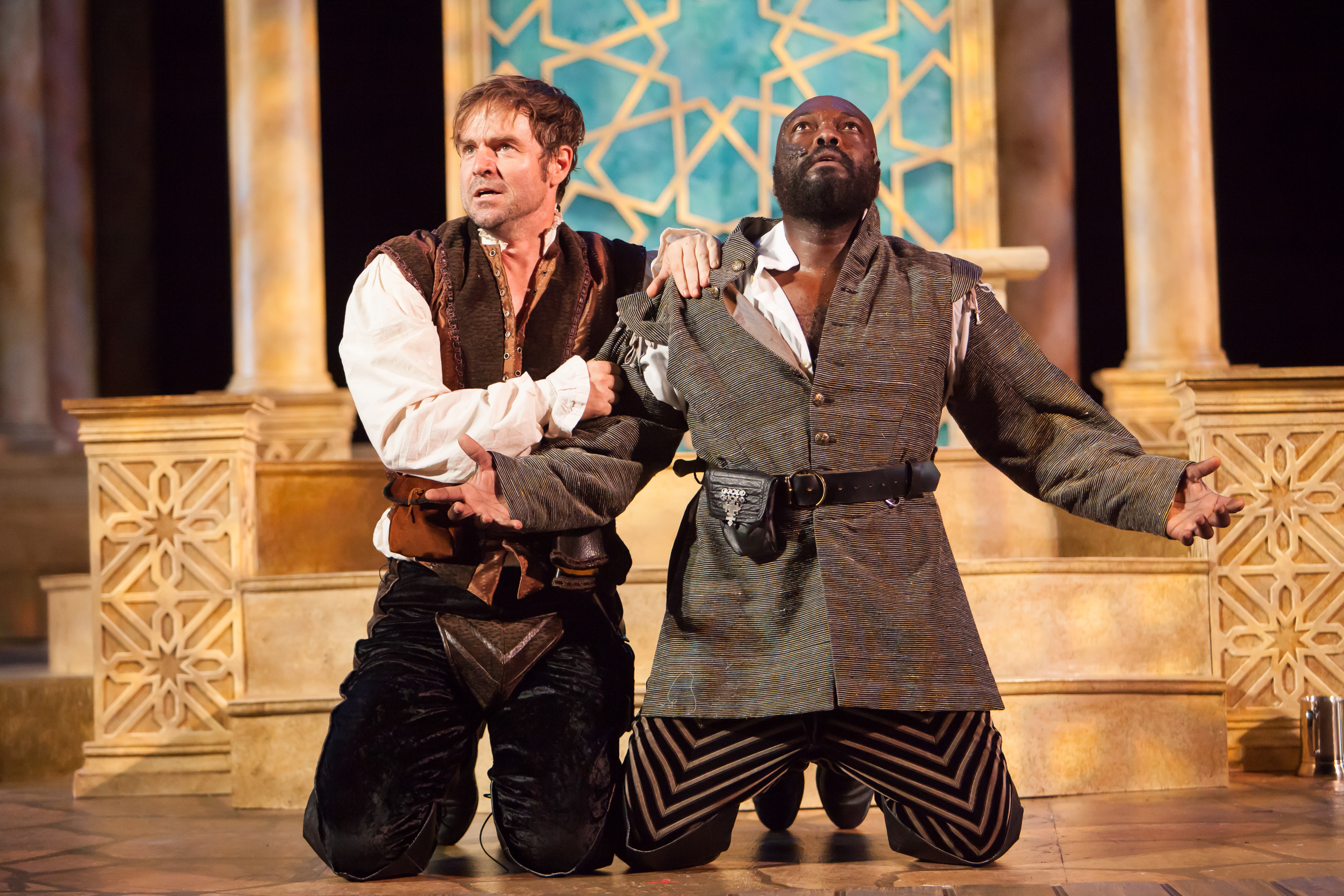
Othello, 2015

2009 Hamlet, Much Ado About Nothing, To Kill a Mockingbird, The Two Gentlemen of Verona, Adam LongDaniel Singer and Jess Winfield's The Complete Works of William Shakespeare (Abridged)

2010 King Lear, The Taming of the Shrew, Measure for Measure, Harvey Schmidt and Tom Jones's The Fantasticks, Thornton Wilder's Our Town

2011 Romeo and Juliet, The Comedy of Errors, The Little Prince, Gogol's The Government Inspector

2012 Twelfth Night, Treasure Island, Richard III, Michael Frayn's Noises Off, Tina Packer's Women of Will

2013 A Midsummer Night's Dream, Macbeth, The Complete Works of William Shakespeare (Abridged), Richard II, Women of Will: The Overview

2014 The Tempest, The Merry Wives of Windsor, Paul Rudnick's I Hate Hamlet, Henry IV Part 1, Henry IV Part 2

2015 Much Ado About Nothing, Othello, David Davalos's Wittenberg, Henry V, Henry VI Part 1

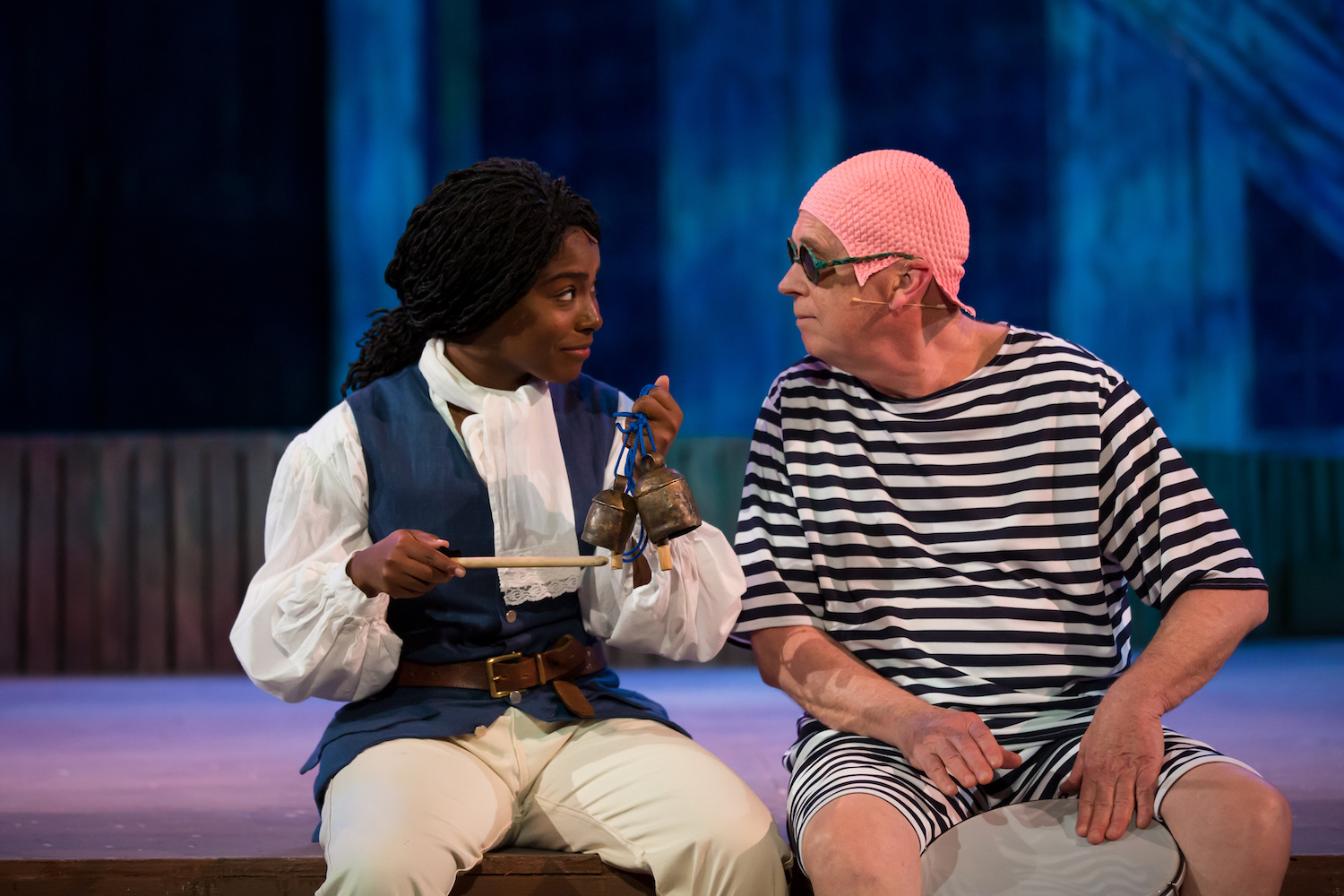
Twelfth Night, 2019

2016 The Comedy of Errors, Bill Cain's Equivocation, Troilus and Cressida, Cymbeline, Henry VI Part 2

2017 The Taming of the Shrew, Hamlet, Julius Caesar, Tom Stoppard's Rosencrantz and Guildenstern Are Dead, Henry VI Part 3

2018 Love's Labour's Lost, Richard III, Edmond Rostand's Cyrano de Bergerac, George S. Kaufmman and Moss Hart's You Can't Take It With You, Edward III

2019 Twelfth Night, As You Like It, Romeo & Juliet, Mike Bartlett's King Charles III, King John

2020 Season Postponed

2021 Season Resumed – A Midsummer Night's Dream, Pericles, Mary Zimmerman's The Odyssey: A Play

2022 The Two Gentleman of Verona, All's Well That Ends Well, Lauren Gunderson's The Book of Will, Coriolanus, Ben Jonson's The Alchemist

2023 Much Ado About Nothing, The Winter's Tale, King Lear, Richard Bean's One Man, Two Guvnors, The Comedy of Errors

2024 Arden of Faversham, Macbeth, The Merry Wives of Windsor

2025 The Tempest, Richard II, Doctor Faustus

2026 Twelfth Night, Julius Caesar, Shakespeare in Love, Friends/Romans/Countrymen

- Not necessarily a complete list for that season

== Education programs ==
One bright spot for CSF during its financial difficulties was the creation of a three-pronged education program. The programs included Camp Shakespeare and a School of Theatre for children, age 6 to 18, and a school tour developed with CU-Boulder's Center for Study and Prevention and Violence, which presents abbreviated Shakespeare plays—Twelfth Night, The Tempest, Much Ado About Nothing and others—and workshops to teach students about such things as bullying and the harm of gossip. Those programs brought in more than $97,000 of revenue and $40,000 in grant funding in 2011–12.

CSF's anti-violence school tour has received national attention, including a story on PBS NewsHour. By the end of 2014, the program had been presented to more than 50,000 Colorado school children.

== Colorado Shakespeare Gardens ==
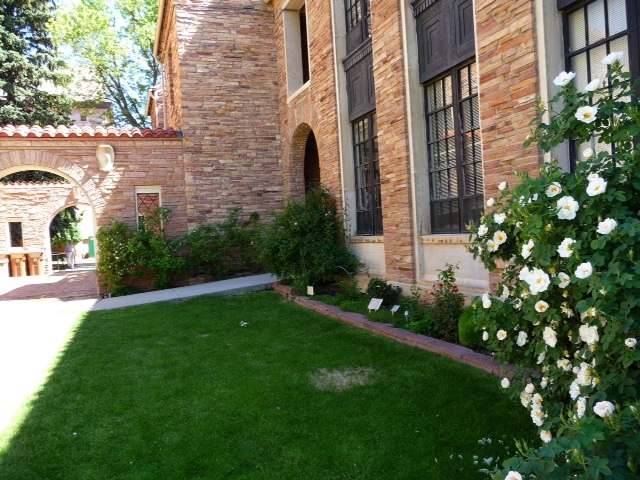
Colorado Shakespeare Gardens

Colorado Shakespeare Gardens, established in 1991,maintains public gardens featuring plants referred to in the works of Shakespeare. The organization provides educational support to the Colorado Shakespeare Festival through free garden tours, public presentations and research. Our goal is to grow plants that were authentic to Shakespeare's time.

The organization's mission statement reads, "To learn, teach, and understand about the plants and their meaning in the plays. To help and assist with the Colorado Shakespeare Festival and the Colorado Shakespeare Guild whenever we are able."

Volunteer members design, plant and maintain the Thyme Garden, Romeo and Juliet Garden, Long Bed Garden and Knot Garden in a courtyard adjacent to the Mary Rippon Outdoor Theatre, between the Hellems Arts and Sciences and Education buildings. Among the plants featured are chamomile, cowslip, lily, hawthorn and rosemary.

Colorado Shakespeare Gardens is currently planning an expansion and upgrade of the gardens that is expected to take several years.

=== Green Shows ===
A musical or other entertainment group performs in the Shakespeare Garden before the evening onstage shows for picnickers and other listeners. The Green Shows start about 90 minutes before the plays begin and last about 45 minutes. The Boulder Renaissance Consort has appeared frequently since the early 1980s.

=== Chuck Wilcox (1943-2026) ===
From 1971-2019, patrons to the festival watched Actor Chuck Wilcox both on stage and in the Shakespeare gardens. An M.A. recipient from CU’s theatre department, Chuck performed on the Rippon in roles such as Kent, Brutus, and Sir Toby Belch., as well as serving as a fight master for several seasonsAfter suffering a stroke, he began a 40 year career playing William Shakespeare. As the cornerstone performer of the festival’s green shows, Chuck educated picnickers about the bard’s life and history, answered questions about that season’s plays, and played the tabor pipe He also supported CSF’s education initiatives throughout the year and his participation at CSF’s annual Will Power Festival brought Shakespeare to life for hundreds of elementary school students. His presence was a valued tradition for such he was the recipient of CU Boulder’s University Medal in 2000.

== Notes ==
re: references 3 and 4, Sylvia Pettem should be Silvia Pettem
