= Christopher Haydon =

British theatre director

- Occupation: Theatre director

Christopher Haydon is a British theatre director and the current Artistic Director of the Gate Theatre in London. After graduating from Cambridge University, and training at Central School of Speech and Drama, Haydon became an associate director at the Bush Theatre and is also associated with the series of plays On Theatre that played at Soho Theatre.

For many years Haydon ran The Guardian's theatre blog, under his birth name Chris Wilkinson. He has contributed as a journalist on theatre to many other publications.

== On Theatre ==
On Theatre is a series of plays created by Mick Gordon often working with experts to explore key issues of everyday life; (e.g. On Death and On Emotion). Haydon supports and directs many of the plays including the play "On Religion" which went under the name Grace and "On Identity" which went under the name Pressure Drop which was a project involving Billy Bragg and his band.

== Gate Theatre ==
In 2011 Haydon became the new artistic director of the Gate Theatre, before taking over he directed Wittenburg by David Davalos which was well received and longlisted for Best New Play at the Evening Standard Awards. Since then he has announced a new season focusing on revolution and rebellion. In researching some of the plays in the new season Haydon was arrested in Egypt alongside the playwright Hassan Abdulrazzak.

== Productions ==
- 2019 Macbeth at the Royal Exchange, Manchester.
- 2013 Twelve Angry Men by Reginald Rose at the Garrick Theatre, London
- 2011 Sixty Six Books directed several of the pieces and was an associate curator at the Bush Theatre
- 2011 Wittenberg by David Davalos at the Gate Theatre
- 2010 Pressure Drop (On Theatre production) by Mick Gordon and Billy Bragg at the Welcome Collection
- 2009 Deep Cut by Philip Ralph for a National Tour
- 2009 Monsters by Niklas Radstrom at the Arcola Theatre
- 2008 A Number by Caryl Churchill at the Salisbury Playhouse
- 2008 Grace (On Theatre production) by Mick Gordon and A. C. Grayling at Theatre du Poche
- 2006 Notes from The Underground by Fyodor Dostoyevsky at the Arcola Theatre
- 2003 Come and Go/The Maids/Agamenon at the CSSD Embassy Studio
- 2002 The Insect Play at Emmanuel College
