= Reduced Shakespeare Company =

Touring American acting troupe

The Reduced Shakespeare Company (RSC) is an American touring acting troupe that performs fast-paced, seemingly improvisational condensations of different topics. The company's style has been described as "New Vaudeville," combining both physical and verbal humor, as well as highbrow and lowbrow.

Known as the "Bad Boys of Abridgment," the RSC has created eleven stage shows: The Complete Works of William Shakespeare (Abridged) in 1987, The Complete History of America (abridged) in 1992, The Bible: The Complete Word of God (abridged) in 1995, The Complete Millennium Musical (abridged) in 1998, All the Great Books (abridged) in 2002, Completely Hollywood (abridged) in 2005, The Complete World of Sports (abridged) in 2010, The Ultimate Christmas Show (abridged) in 2011, The Complete History of Comedy (abridged) in 2013, William Shakespeare's Long Lost First Play (abridged) in 2016, and The Comedy of Hamlet (a prequel) in 2019. The company tours in the US and UK, and has performed in Belgium, Netherlands, Canada, Australia, New Zealand, Japan, China, Singapore, Barbados, Bermuda, Israel, Qatar and Ireland. The Reduced Shakespeare Company is also heard on NPR and the BBC.

== Formation and early years ==
The company was founded in 1981 by Daniel Singer, who wrote a 25-minute, four-actor version of William Shakespeare's Hamlet, to be performed at the Renaissance Pleasure Faire in Novato, California. He cast himself as Polonius, Horatio, and Laertes; Jess Borgeson (now Jess Winfield) as the prince; Michael Fleming as Bernardo, Claudius, and the Ghost of Hamlet's father; and Barbara Reinertson as Ophelia and Gertrude. When Reinertson broke her ankle three weeks into the run, Borgeson suggested that school chum Adam Long fill in for her in drag.

Borgeson returned to college in 1983 to pursue a degree in English literature, leaving Singer and Long to continue under the RSC banner. They penned a 20-minute version of Shakespeare's Romeo and Juliet, which they performed at Renaissance fairs, on street corners, beaches, and at private events. Crowds were amazed to see two men arrive with a small basket of costumes, two fencing foils, two bottles of poison, a rose, a dagger, a wig and a dummy, and proceed to enact the entire story with the zany style of a Marx Brothers movie.

Borgeson rejoined the troupe in 1985, and so Singer's version of Hamlet was resurrected into the repertoire. Several actors had come and gone in the roles of Bernardo, the Ghost, and Claudius; the last in the series excused himself when his daughter was born. The three-man RSC was born at that time, with Long taking over those roles. In 1987, a friend of the company suggested that they'd find a welcome reception at the famous Edinburgh Festival Fringe in Scotland. The ideal show length being about an hour, they decided they needed about 20 more minutes of material, and proposed doing Shakespeare's other 35 plays to round out an abridgement of everything the bard wrote in less than one hour. Sa Thomson (now Sa Winfield), brought on to design and fabricate the troupe's quick-change props and costumes, became a full partner in 1988, and also occasionally appeared as a performer with the troupe, most famously in the title role of the RSC's incarnation as the Abbreviated Ballet Theatre for Lucinda, Wood Nymph of the Glade.

== Touring ==
The Complete Works script that resulted from these collaborations successfully premiered in an open-framed barn at the Paramount Ranch in Agoura, adjacent to the site of the Southern California Renaissance Faire. It then moved to Edinburgh proper, being performed in a church basement at 10:30 a.m. for a three-week run to generally sold-out houses. After that, the show (expanded to 97 minutes) toured theatres and festivals around the world. In repertory with the RSC's second show, The Complete History of America (abridged), The Complete Works of William Shakespeare (Abridged) ran for nine years at the Criterion Theatre, London West End, with the company's third show, The Bible: The Complete Word of God (abridged), joining the line-up for the final three years of the London run.

Singer left the Company in 1989 and was replaced by Reed Martin; Borgeson left in 1992 and was replaced by Austin Tichenor. In 1993 Long, Martin and Tichenor wrote the company's second play, The Complete History of America (abridged). They followed this up with The Bible: The Complete Word of God (abridged) in 1995.

== Recordings ==
In 1994 Tichenor, Long and Martin created a six-part radio series called The Reduced Shakespeare Radio Show. It was broadcast on the BBC World Service from May 11 to June 22, 1994. In 1994 they also produced The Ring Reduced, a half-hour version of Richard Wagner's operatic Ring Cycle, as part of Channel 4's Wagner season. In 1995, the RSC recorded The Reduced Shakespeare Company Christmas, a take on Christmas and other December-related holidays. For the turn of the century Martin and Tichenor wrote The Complete Millennium Musical (abridged) along with composer Nick Graham. A video version of The Complete Works of William Shakespeare (abridged) was released on DVD in 2001. Also in 2001, John Knox/Westminster Press published Martin and Tichenor's comic, spiritual memoir entitled The Greatest Story Ever Sold.

In August 2005, at the Sebastiani Theatre in Sonoma, California, the Reduced Shakespeare Company recorded its second show on DVD, The Complete History of America (abridged). Martin and Tichenor's second book, Reduced Shakespeare: The Attention Impaired Reader's Guide to the World's Best Playwright (abridged) was published by Hyperion in 2006. The Reduced Shakespeare Company Podcast was also introduced in 2006. It is a free, weekly twenty-minute podcast available on iTunes, as well as on the Reduced Shakespeare Company website. The Reduced Shakespeare Company has been nominated for an Olivier Award in London, two Helen Hayes Awards, a Bay Area Theatre Critics Circle Award, and two Podcast Awards. The company won a Shorty Award for Outstanding Use of Twitter by a Cultural Institution in 2009. In 2010 Martin & Tichenor reduced the first five season of the hit television series Lost into a comical ten minutes for Sky TV in Britain. They performed Lost Reduced along with Matt Rippy. It can be seen on YouTube.

== Other works ==
Martin and Tichenor created the troupe's fifth stage show All the Great Books (abridged) in 2002, followed by Completely Hollywood (abridged) in 2005. Both these shows toured extensively across the USA and Great Britain, including runs at the Kennedy Center and the Edinburgh Fringe Festival. The Complete World of Sports (abridged) by Martin and Tichenor debuted 2010 and has also toured across the USA and Great Britain with runs at the New Victory Theater in New York City, the Kennedy Center in Washington DC, and the Arts Theatre in London. The RSC premiered The Ultimate Christmas (abridged) in 2011 at Merrimack Repertory Theatre in Lowell, MA and performed the show at San Diego Repertory Theatre in 2012. In November 2013 The Complete History of Comedy (abridged) premiered with a seven-week run at Cincinnati Playhouse in the Park, with a month-long run at Merrimack Repertory Theatre to follow beginning in April 2014. In January 2014, some controversy surrounded the announcement of a performance of The Bible: The Complete Word of God (abridged) in at a borough-owned theatre in Newtownabbey, Northern Ireland: a Newtownabbey Borough Councillor from the Democratic Unionist Party decried the shows blasphemous nature, saying "I'd be calling for public pressure to have it pulled. My wife, councillor Audrey Ball, has recently been put on the artistic board" and that "Those against her strong beliefs better watch out." On January 23, 2014 the Newtownabbey Borough Council voted to cancel the performances. This decision led to tremendous public outcry and show support for the RSC from many sources including Richard Dawkins, Tim Minchin, the Arts Council of Northern Ireland and Amnesty International. As a result, the council reversed its decision on January 27 and the performances went on as originally scheduled and received a rave review from the Belfast Telegraph. The publicity surrounding these events led to a huge boost in ticket sales for the entire 2014 UK tour of the show.

The RSC premiered William Shakespeare's Long Lost First Play (abridged) at the Folger Theatre in Washington DC in April/May 2016 to rave reviews, followed by the European premiere at the Edinburgh Festival Fringe in August 2016.

== Works ==
=== Plays ===
Year of Original Production	Year of Original Publication	Title	Authors	Notes
1987	1994	The Complete Works of William Shakespeare (abridged)	Adam Long, Daniel Singer, Jess Winfield	
1992	1994	The Complete History of America (abridged)	Adam Long, Reed Martin, Austin Tichenor	
1995		The Bible: The Complete Word of God (abridged)	Adam Long, Reed Martin, Austin Tichenor	
1998		Western Civilization! The Complete Musical (abridged)	book and lyrics by Reed Martin and Austin Tichenor, original music composed by Nick Graham; additional material by Dee Ryan	Originally titled The Complete Millennium Musical (abridged)
2002		All the Great Books (abridged)	Reed Martin and Austin Tichenor, additional material by Matthew Croke and Michael Faulkner	
2005		Completely Hollywood (abridged)	Reed Martin and Austin Tichenor, additional material by Dominic Conti	
2010		The Complete World of Sports (abridged)	Reed Martin and Austin Tichenor, additional material by Matt Rippy	
2011		The Ultimate Christmas Show (abridged)	Reed Martin and Austin Tichenor	
2013		The Complete History of Comedy (abridged)	Reed Martin and Austin Tichenor	
2016		William Shakespeare's Long Lost First Play (abridged)	Reed Martin and Austin Tichenor	
2019		The Comedy of Hamlet (a prequel)	Reed Martin and Austin Tichenor	

== Records ==
The RSC was listed in the 2017 edition of the Guinness Book of World Records for holding the Guinness record for the longest-running Shakespeare show in the West End with 3,744 performances between March 7, 1996 and April 3, 2005 at the Criterion Theatre; and for the highest theatrical performance, for their performance aboard an EasyJet flight from London to Verona on Shakespeare’s birthday in 2014.
