= Gate Theatre (London) =

Theatre in Notting Hill, London, England

Coordinates: 51.5094°N 0.1975°W

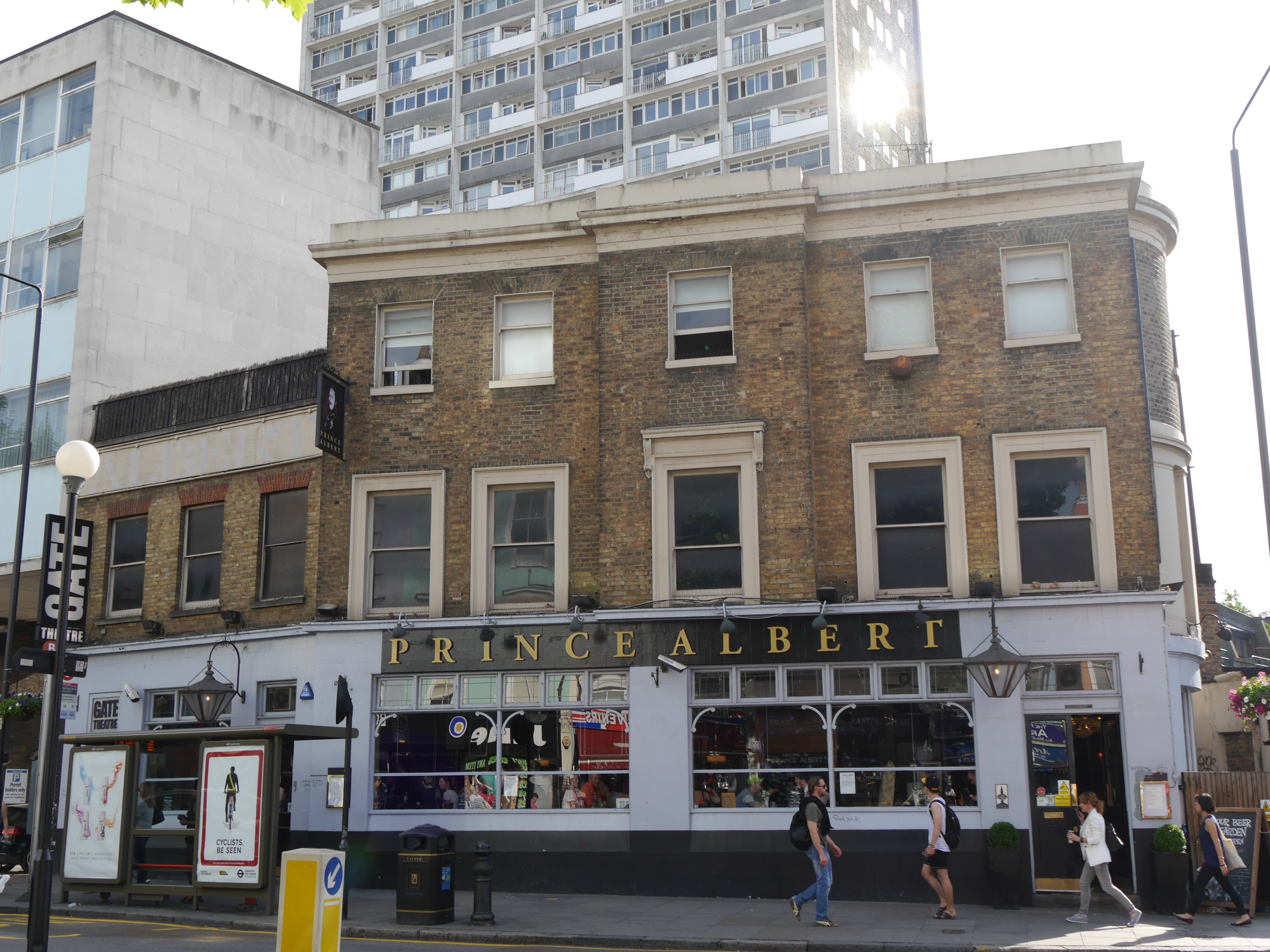
- Former location of Gate Theatre in Notting Hill
- Interactive map of the Gate Theatre area

General information
- Location: Notting Hill Gate, London, UK
- Opened: 1979

The Gate Theatre is a theatre in London which was originally established above the Prince Albert pub in Notting Hill in 1979 with the aim of bringing international plays to London. With 75 seats, it was known as the smallest "off-West End" theatre in the city. The Gate now operates as a theatre producing company, working with partners, venues and audiences in London and beyond, showing work from beyond the United Kingdom. In September 2026 it was announced that the theatre would close its doors at the end of October 2026 due to "unsustainable" funding pressures.

== History ==
The Gate was opened in 1979 in Notting Hill. It developed a reputation for radical and political productions but lost its Arts Council England funding in 2022.

The Gate has won numerous awards, including Olivier, Critic's Circle, Peter Brook, Fringe First, LWT, and Time Out awards. Its work has been nominated for Off West End, Stage, Evening Standard, Carol Tambor, Amnesty International, and South Bank awards.

Some of the actors and practitioners to have worked at the Gate include Sir Robert Stephens, Stephen Daldry, Jude Law, Kelly Hunter, Rachel Weisz, Alex Kingston, Kathy Burke, Sam Shepherd, Sir Peter Hall, Sarah Kane, Katie Mitchell, Nancy Meckler, Mick Gordon, Tobias Menzies, and Ian Rickson.

== Artistic Directors ==
- 1979–1985 Lou Stein
- 1985–1990 Giles Croft
- 1990–1992 Stephen Daldry
- 1992–1996 Lawrence Boswell
- 1996–1998 David Farr
- 1998–2001 Mick Gordon
- 2001–2004 Erica Whyman
- 2004–2007 Thea Sharrock
- 2007–2012 Natalie Abrahami and Carrie Cracknell
- 2012–2017 Christopher Haydon
- 2017–2021 Ellen McDougall
- 2022–2023 Stef O'Driscoll (Interim)
- 2023– Atri Banerjee (as Creative Associate 2023–25, Artistic Lead 2025– )

== Executive Directors ==
- Kate Denby
- –2015 Jonathan Hull
- 2015-2016 Clare Slater
- 2016-2018 Joanne Royce
- 2018– 2021 Lise Bell
- 2021 - 2022 Shawab Iqbal
- 2022 - Nicola Clements
