= David de Berry =

US composer (1952-1995)

David de Berry (1952–1995) was a U.S. composer of theater music as well as an actor and music director.

De Berry is best known for the score of a 1987 adaptation of Charles Dickens's A Christmas Carol, on which he collaborated with playwright Richard Hellesen and director Dennis Bigelow. Originally commissioned for the Sacramento Theatre Company, the work has been widely seen, with perennial productions in Rochester, New York, Denver, Colorado, Dallas, Texas, Baton Rouge, Louisiana, Phoenix, Arizona, among other communities.

The resident composer and musical director of the Sacramento Theatre Company, de Berry wrote original music for many productions there and at other companies, including the Portland Center Stage in Portland, Oregon and the Oregon Shakespeare Festival in Ashland, Oregon. His scores graced many classic works by Shakespeare and Molière as well as contemporary plays. He was also co-author of the musical A Cappella, also written with Hellesen.

As an actor, the 6-foot-5 (196 cm) de Berry specialized in comic, often oversized roles. He gave a memorable performance in the title role of a Sacramento Theatre Company production of The Imaginary Invalid. The role of a hypochondriac was written by Molière—who, it turned out, was really ill, and who died shortly after a performance in the title role. De Berry put every ounce of himself into the role, possibly knowing that for him, too, it was almost certainly his last time on stage. He died shortly thereafter in Oregon, where he was working on a score.

De Berry grew up in Redding, California and was a graduate of the University of California, Davis, and Boston University. As an undergraduate at UC Davis, de Berry performed in several plays, including the role of Don Quixote in Man of La Mancha.
