= Robert Sandberg =

American dramatist

- Born: Robert Neil Sandberg
- Education: Upper Darby High School; Princeton University (BA); Yale School of Drama (MFA)
- Occupation: Playwright
- Writing career
- Pen name: R. N. Sandberg

Robert Neil Sandberg, known professionally as R. N. Sandberg, is an American playwright and was a lecturer in the Princeton University Lewis Center for the Arts and Department of English. from 1995 to 2022.

A graduate of Upper Darby High School, Sandberg received his B.A. from Princeton University in 1970 and his M.F.A. from the Yale School of Drama at Yale University in 1977.

Sandberg's plays have been performed in Australia, Canada, England, Japan, Panama, and South Korea as well as throughout the U.S. Theatres that have presented his work include The Barrow Group, Barter Theatre, Dallas Children’s Theatre, Fulton Opera House, George Street Playhouse, Idaho Shakespeare Festival, Indiana Rep, Intiman Theatre, Kennedy Center, Kitchen Dog, La Mama, Merrimack Repertory Theater, New Jersey Rep, New York Music Theatre Festival, New York State Theatre Institute, Open Eye, Passage Theatre Company, Providence Black Rep, Provincetown Playhouse, Seattle Rep, Stage One: Louisville’s Children Theatre, Stages Repertory Theatre and Yale Cabaret.

Sandberg has won several awards for his work. Can’t Believe It won a 2005 Bonderman National Playwriting award. The Trials of the Massachusetts Servants won the American Repertory Theatre’s 2006 Discovering Justice contest. A selection from In Between appeared in Best Stage Scenes 2006. Two monologues from Roundelay are in 2013 The Best Men's Stage Monologues. The Judgment of Bett was included in the volume Kennedy Center New Vision/New Voices: 25 years/25 Plays. His plays are published by Dramatic Publishing and Playscripts, Inc. and include Anne of Green Gables, Convivencia, Done, Frankenstein, Good-bye Dolly, In Between, Jarpteetza/The Firebird, A Little Princess, Martina: Lost and Found, The Moonstone, The Odyssey, and Sara Crewe.

Before joining the Princeton faculty in 1995, he was the Chair of the Theater Department at Cornish College of the Arts in Seattle, Washington.
