= Richard Hellesen =

American dramatist

Richard Hellesen (born 1956) is a West Coast playwright.

His play "Eisenhower: This Piece of Ground" premiered Off-Broadway at the Theatre at St. Clements starring John Rubinstein in June, 2023, after a developmental production in October/November, 2022 at Theatre West in Los Angeles. Hellesen's works have been performed by regional theater companies including South Coast Repertory in Orange County, California, the LA Rep (Los Angeles Repertory Company), the Denver Center Theatre Company, Ford's Theatre in Washington, DC, City Theatre in Miami, Florida, and Geva Theatre in Rochester, New York. A California resident, the playwright has served on the faculty of California State University, Fullerton and American River College, and has been a resident artist at the William Inge Center for the Arts in Independence, Kansas. He received the Barrie and Bernice Stavis Playwriting Award from the National Theatre Conference in 1998. His 1987 musical adaptation of Charles Dickens's A Christmas Carol, written with composer David de Berry, may be Hellesen's most widely produced work.

== Plays by Hellesen (full-length/one-act/theatre for young audiences; date of first production) ==
- Eisenhower: This Piece of Ground (2022)
- Necessary Sacrifices (2012)
- The Road From Appomattox (2009)
- Gathering Blue (adapted from Lois Lowry; 2008)
- You're Getting Warmer (2008)
- Johnny Tremain (adapted from Esther Forbes; 2007)
- One Destiny (2006)
- The Emperor's New Clothes (adapted from Andersen; 2006)
- Eureka! (2006)
- Birdman (2005)
- The Wind in the Willows (adapted from Kenneth Grahame; 2004)
- A Speedy and Public Trial (adapted from Kafka; 2004)
- The Pride of Weedpatch Camp (2004)
- Indian Summer (2003)
- Power Play (2002)
- Teardown (2001)
- Bad Water Blues (2001)
- Communique (2001)
- Kingdom (1999)
- Untamed (1998)
- Counting Ninas (1998)
- Cyrano de Bergerac (adapted from Rostand; 1998)
- Layin' Off the Lizard-Boy (1997)
- 4/100ths (1997)
- Caribbean Folk Tales (1997)
- Trashed! (1997)
- Birds of a Feather (1995)
- Dos Corazones (1994)
- A Cappella (1994)
- My Mom's Dad (1993)
- Face2Face (1991)
- Once In Arden (1990)
- Gift Rap (1990)
- The Twelve Dancing Princesses (adapted from the Brothers Grimm; 1990)
- A Christmas Carol (adapted from Dickens; 1987)
- Moonshadow (1987)
- Couvade (1987)
- Drive In (1976)
- 1040 Blues ( 1974)
