= Daniel Singer (actor) =

American actor, director, and stage writer (1959–2026)

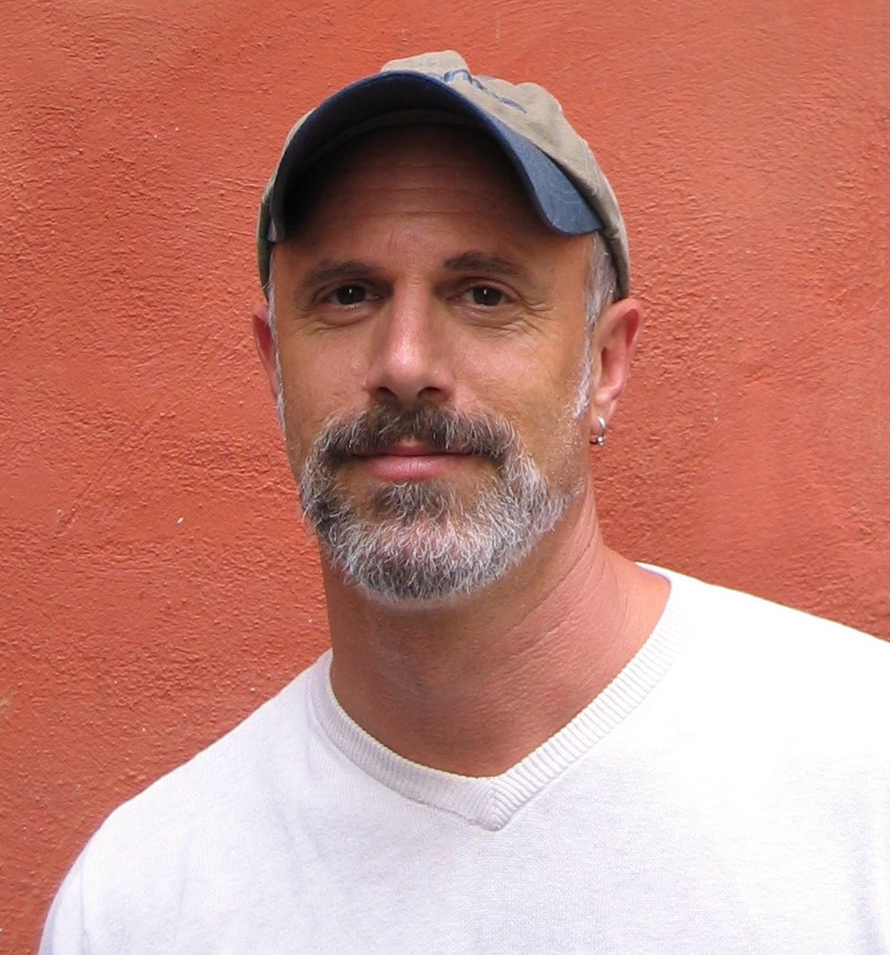
- Born: October 8, 1959; Palo Alto, California, U.S.
- Died: September 22, 2026 (aged 66); Los Angeles, California, U.S.
- Other name: Daniel Rover Singer
- Occupations: Stage, television playwright, actor
- Years active: 1977–2026
- Known for: The Complete Works of William Shakespeare (Abridged) (2000).

Daniel Alan "Rover" Singer (October 8, 1959 – September 22, 2026) was an American actor, director, and stage writer known for The Complete Works of William Shakespeare (Abridged) (2000).

== Career ==
At the age of 17, Singer co-founded General Amazement Theater in Santa Rosa, California, which produced three musicals in its first and only season, including Singer's original adaptation of Alice in Wonderland. After returning to California from studying drama at the Guildford School of Acting near London, he co-founded the Reduced Shakespeare Company, whose three-man farce The Complete Works of William Shakespeare (Abridged) has been performed around the world since its debut in 1987, including nine years in London's West End. He continued writing and producing plays, even while working full time as a Disney Imagineer. "A Perfect Likeness," about a fictitious meeting between Lewis Carroll and Charles Dickens, has been produced in North America and the U.K. since 2013. "LOUISA@FRUITLANDS," about preteen Louisa May Alcott during the time when she and her family lived on a vegan commune, premiered in 2026. Other plays yet to be produced include "Get A Room" and several others. Singer also founded, directed and performed with the pirate shanty-band QuarterMaster, and was an inspiration to many seeking to be their true, authentic selves.

== Personal life and death ==
Singer was born in Palo Alto, California, on October 8, 1959. He was married to Cal Smith. Singer died in Los Angeles due to complications from cancer surgery on September 22, 2026, at the age of 66.
