= Adam Long (American actor) =

American writer

Adam Long is an American writer, voice director, and voice actor based in London, United Kingdom. He is a founding member of The Reduced Shakespeare Company. From 1987 to 2003, he co-wrote and performed The Complete Works of William Shakespeare (Abridged), The Complete History of America (Abridged), The Reduced Shakespeare Radio Show for the BBC World Service, and The Ring Reduced, a 30-minute condensation of Wagner's Ring Cycle for Channel 4 television.

In 1996, Long directed the Reduced Shakespeare Company's London production of The Complete Works of William Shakespeare (Abridged) which was nominated for an Olivier Award for Best Comedy in 1997, and ran for nine years at the Criterion Theatre in Piccadilly Circus. Stage production licensing in the U.S. and Canada is by Broadway Play Publishing.

Long left The Reduced Shakespeare Company in 2003. He then co-wrote and starred in The Barn, an independent feature film which won a British Independent Film Award in 2004 - The Raindance Award, for the film which best embodies the spirit of independent filmmaking. In 2006, he wrote and performed Star Wars Shortened for Sky Movies, and The Condensed History of Tony Blair for BBC Radio 4. In 2007 he wrote and directed Dickens Unplugged, which premiered at the Edinburgh Fringe Festival. The show was brought to Guildford in February, 2007, and made its West End debut on May 23, 2008 at the Comedy Theatre. It has been published as Dickens (abridged) by Broadway Play Publishing Inc. In 2008, he wrote and performed The Condensed History of Political Parties for BBC Radio 4, and in 2009 The Condensed History of George W Bush, also for BBC Radio 4.

From 2008, Long has worked in animation, writing for Netflix, CBBC, CBeebies, Disney, Nickelodeon, and Sprout. He is the voice of Mr. Small in seasons 2 to 6 of the BAFTA and Emmy Award-winning animated series The Amazing World of Gumball. He has also provided voices for Elliott from Earth.

Long resides in London.
