= David Davalos =

American playwright (born 1965)

David Davalos (born 1965) is an American playwright.

== Works ==
- 2001 - Darkfall - a modern sequel to Paradise Lost. World Premiere at Sacred Fools Theater Company in Los Angeles.
- 2002 - Daedalus - a fantasia of Leonardo da Vinci's time as a military engineer to Cesare Borgia, in the company of Lucrezia Borgia and Niccolò Machiavelli
- 2008 - Wittenberg - a "tragical-comical-historical" prequel to Hamlet, Doctor Faustus (play) and the Protestant Reformation
