= The Complete Works of William Shakespeare (Abridged) =

Parody of Shakespeare's plays

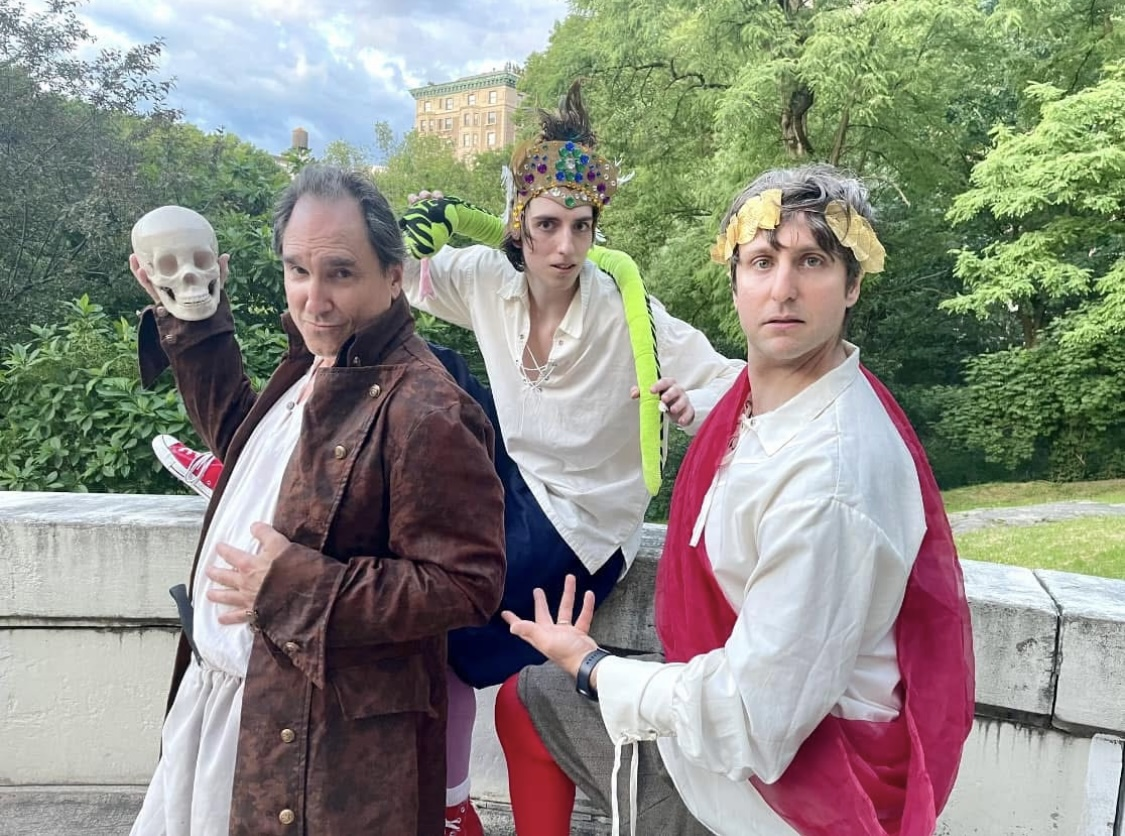
Trio playing various roles in Complete Works

The Complete Works of William Shakespeare (Abridged) (also known as The Compleat Wrks of Wllm Shkspr (Abridged)) is a play written by Adam Long, Daniel Singer, and Jess Winfield. It parodies the plays of William Shakespeare with all of them being performed in comically shortened or merged form by only three actors. Typically, the actors use their real names and play themselves rather than specific characters.

== Overview ==
The fourth wall is nonexistent in the performance, with the actors speaking directly to the audience during much of the play, and some scenes involve audience participation. The director and stage crew may also be directly involved in the performance and become characters themselves.

The script contains many humorous footnotes on the text that are often not included in the performance. However, improvisation plays an important role and it is normal for the actors to deviate from the script and have spontaneous conversations about the material with each other or the audience. It is also common for them to make references to pop culture or to talk about local people and places in the area where the play is being performed. Also, the authors' notes strongly encourage performers to update outdated references and jokes so that the material doesn't come off as out of touch. As a result, performances differ, even with the same cast.

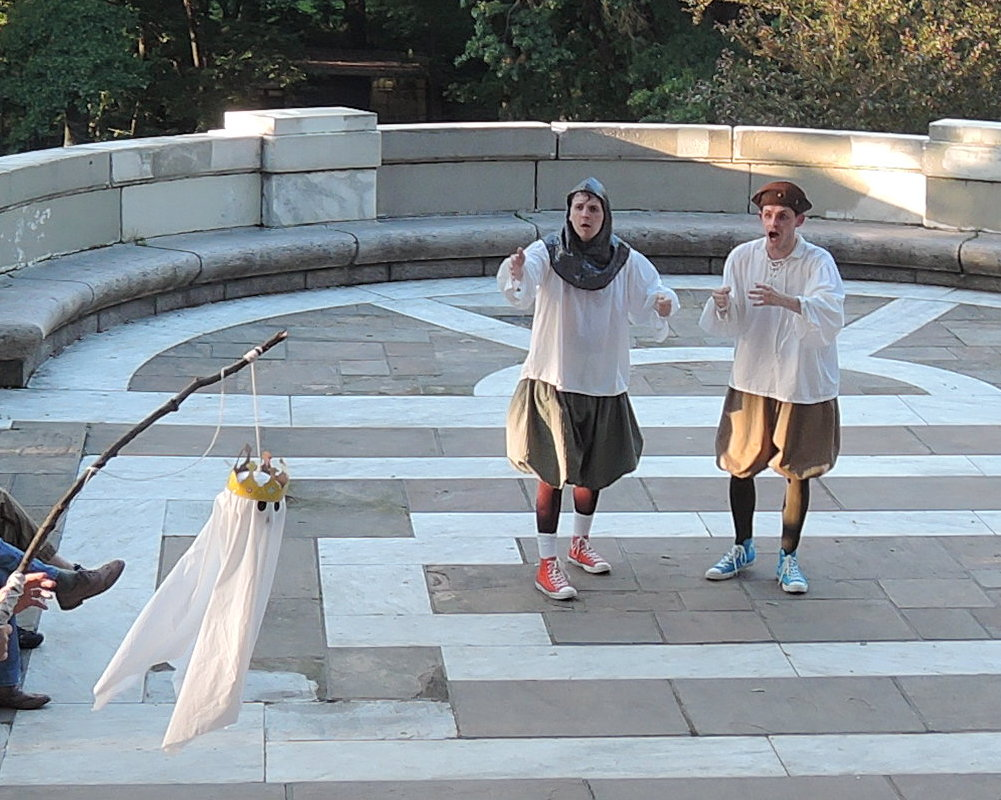
Ghost makes first scary appearance

== History ==
The writers, Long, Singer, and Winfield—founding members of the Reduced Shakespeare Company—performed a "reduced" version of Hamlet at the Renaissance Pleasure Faire in Novato, California in the early 1980s. They presented an expanded version including Shakespeare's other plays at Edinburgh Festival Fringe in 1987, and later at the Criterion Theatre in London, where it ran for nine years.

== Synopsis ==
The three actors introduce themselves to the audience, the first (Daniel Singer) reminding the audience not to record the show, the second (Jess Winfield) giving a speech about how unappreciated William Shakespeare is and the third (Adam Long) giving a biography of Shakespeare mixed up with Adolf Hitler.

They begin with a parody of Romeo and Juliet. Next, they caricature Titus Andronicus as a cooking show. Following that is Othello done as a rap song. The rest of the first act summarizes most of the other plays. All the comedies are combined into one convoluted reading (the justification being that they all recycle the same plot devices anyway). The histories are portrayed as an American football game with the British Crown as the football (or as a soccer match in at least one German production, or an Australian Rules football game in an Australian production). Julius Caesar is shortened to his death, followed immediately by a brief Antony and Cleopatra, and Macbeth abridged to one duel while explaining all about ketchup and mustard and other elements (witches, Macbeth's downfall, etc.) in poor Scottish accents. There is also a failed attempt at scholarly discussion of the Shakespeare Apocrypha.

At the end of the act, the characters realise that they forgot to perform Coriolanus which Adam refuses due to the vulgarity of the title, and also Hamlet, Shakespeare's epitome. Adam becomes nervous and petulant about performing the famous and difficult play, so he runs around the theatre and out the door chased by Jess. Daniel is left alone to improvise before calling for intermission.

After the intermission, Jess and Adam return, saving Daniel from having to cover the sonnets by writing them down on a 3×5 card and passing it around the audience. Adam is convinced to continue with the performance. The entire second act comprises Hamlet. The audience gets involved during this segment when one audience member is asked to portray Ophelia for the Nunnery Scene. The rest of the audience makes up Ophelia's subconscious, divided into three sections representing her ego, superego, and id. After the performance of Hamlet, the actors repeat it several times increasing their speed of delivery, and finish by reciting it backwards.

== See also ==
- Complete Works of Shakespeare

== Bibliography ==
- Abele, Elizabeth (2004). "Introduction: Whither Shakespop? Taking Stock of Shakespeare in Popular Culture". College Literature. 31 (4, Shakespeare and Popular Culture). The Johns Hopkins University Press: 1–11. ISSN 0093-3139. JSTOR 25115224.
- Long, Adam; Singer, Daniel; Winfield, Jess; Borgeson, Jess (1987). The Complete Works of William Shakespeare (Abridged): Acting Edition. Applause Books.
- Peterson, Jean (1991). "The Complete Works of William Shakespeare (Abridged) by The Reduced Shakespeare Company, Jess Borgeson, Adam Long, Daniel Singer, Reed Martin". Shakespeare Bulletin. 9 (3). The Johns Hopkins University Press: 24–25. eISSN 1931-1427. ISSN 0748-2558. JSTOR 44657939.
