= List of American films of 2004 =

This is a list of American films released in 2004.

== Box office ==
The highest-grossing American films released in 2004, by domestic box office gross revenue, are as follows:

Highest-grossing films of 2004
Rank	Title	Distributor	Domestic gross
1	Shrek 2	DreamWorks Distribution	$441,181,022
2	Spider-Man 2	Sony Pictures	$373,400,548
3	The Passion of the Christ	Newmarket Films	$369,895,386
4	Meet the Fockers	Universal Pictures	$279,261,160
5	The Incredibles	Disney	$261,441,092
6	Harry Potter and the Prisoner of Azkaban	Warner Bros. Pictures	$249,541,069
7	The Day After Tomorrow	20th Century Fox	$186,716,750
8	The Bourne Supremacy	Universal Pictures	$176,241,941
9	National Treasure	Disney	$173,008,894
10	The Polar Express	Warner Bros. Pictures	$162,775,358

== January–March ==
Opening		Title	Production company	Cast and crew	Ref.
J A N U A R Y	9	Chasing Liberty	Warner Bros. Pictures / Alcon Entertainment	Andy Cadiff (director); Derek Guiley, David Schneiderman (screenplay); Mandy Moore, Matthew Goode, Jeremy Piven, Annabella Sciorra, Caroline Goodall, Mark Harmon, Stark Sands, Garrick Hagon, Beatrice Rosen, Martin Hancock, Miriam Margoyles, The Roots	
J A N U A R Y	9	My Baby's Daddy	Miramax Films / Immortal Entertainment	Cheryl Dunye (director); Eddie Griffin, Damon 'Coke' Daniels, Brent Goldberg, David T. Wagner (screenplay); Eddie Griffin, Anthony Anderson, Michael Imperioli, Method Man, John Amos, Paula Jai Parker, Joanna Bacalso, Bai Ling, Marsha Thomason, Amy Sedaris, Bobb'e J. Thompson, Tommy "Tiny" Lister Jr., Randy Sklar, Jason Sklar, Denis Akiyama, Russell Peters, Kardinal Offishall, Scott Thompson, Daya Vaidya, Riele Downs, Panou, Genelle Williams	
J A N U A R Y	16	Along Came Polly	Universal Pictures / Jersey Films	John Hamburg (director/screenplay); Ben Stiller, Jennifer Aniston, Philip Seymour Hoffman, Debra Messing, Hank Azaria, Bryan Brown, Alec Baldwin, Jsu Garcia, Michele Lee, Bob Dishy, Missi Pyle, Judah Friedlander, Kevin Hart, Masi Oka, Kym E. Whitley, Nathan Dean, Cheryl Hines, Caroline Aaron, Christina Kirk, Todd Stashwick, Michael Shamberg, Nick Jameson, Ronald Hunter, Jeffrey Ross, Mitch Silpa, David Wain	
J A N U A R Y	16	Teacher's Pet	Walt Disney Pictures	Timothy Björklund (director); Gary Baseman, Bill Steinkellner, Cheri Steinkellner (screenplay); Nathan Lane, Kelsey Grammer, Shaun Fleming, Debra Jo Rupp, David Ogden Stiers, Jerry Stiller, Paul Reubens, Megan Mullally, Rob Paulsen, Wallace Shawn, Estelle Harris, Jay Thomas, Rosalyn Landor, Genie Francis, Anthony Geary, Mae Whitman, Lauren Tom, Pamela S. Adlon, Timothy Stack, Ken Swofford, Kevin Michael Richardson	
J A N U A R Y	16	Torque	Warner Bros. Pictures / Village Roadshow Pictures	Joseph Kahn (director); Matt Johnson (screenplay); Martin Henderson, Ice Cube, Monet Mazur, Adam Scott, Matt Schulze, Jaime Pressly, Jay Hernandez, Will Yun Lee, Max Beesley, Christina Milian, Faizon Love, Fredro Starr, Justina Machado, Kinga Philipps, Eddie Steeples, Jerry Winsett, Dane Cook, Jesse James, Joseph Kahn, Scott Waugh, Monster Magnet	
J A N U A R Y	18	Everyday People	HBO Films	Jim McKay (director/screenplay); Jordan Gelber, Ron Butler, Reg E. Cathey, muMs da Schemer, Steve Axelrod, Earl Baker Jr., Bridget Barkan, Kalimi Baxter, Ron Ben-Israel, Kadijah Carlisle, Julia Carothers Hughes, Stephen McKinley Henderson, Stephanie Berry, Miles Bridgett, David Brummel	
J A N U A R Y	23	The Butterfly Effect	New Line Cinema / FilmEngine / Dogwood Pictures / Benderspink	Eric Bress, J. Mackye Gruber (directors/screenplay); Ashton Kutcher, Amy Smart, Elden Henson, William Lee Scott, Eric Stoltz, Ethan Suplee, Logan Lerman, Melora Walters, John Patrick Amedori, Cameron Bright, Irene Gorovaia, Jesse Hutch, Jake Kaese, Kevin G. Schmidt, Kevin Durand, Callum Keith Rennie, Lorena Gale, Jesse James, Nathaniel DeVeaux, Tara Wilson, Sarah Widdows, Jacqueline Stewart	
J A N U A R Y	23	Win a Date with Tad Hamilton!	DreamWorks Pictures	Robert Luketic (director); Victor Levin (screenplay); Kate Bosworth, Josh Duhamel, Topher Grace, Gary Cole, Ginnifer Goodwin, Sean Hayes, Nathan Lane, Kathryn Hahn, Octavia Spencer, Amy Smart, Stephen Tobolowsky, Moon Bloodgood, Mary Jo Smith, Joseph Convery, Deena Dill, Bob Glouberman, Jay Underwood, Sam Pancake, Patrick O'Brien, Willow Bay, David Wolrod, Jessy Moss, Marshall Goodman, Danny Weissfeld, Caleb Speir, Jordana Brewster, Paris Hilton, Bonnie McKee	
J A N U A R Y	30	The Big Bounce	Warner Bros. Pictures / Shangri-La Entertainment	George Armitage (director); Sebastian Gutierrez (screenplay); Owen Wilson, Morgan Freeman, Gary Sinise, Sara Foster, Willie Nelson, Vinnie Jones, Bebe Neuwirth, Charlie Sheen, Harry Dean Stanton, Gregory Sporleder, Andrew Wilson, Wendy Thorlakson, Leigh French, Kala Alexander, Kelly Slater	
J A N U A R Y	30	The Perfect Score	Paramount Pictures / MTV Films	Brian Robbins (director); Mark Schwahn, Marc Hyman, Jon Zack (screenplay); Erika Christensen, Chris Evans, Bryan Greenberg, Scarlett Johansson, Darius Miles, Leonardo Nam, Matthew Lillard, Fulvio Cecere, Vanessa Angel, Lorena Gale, Tyra Ferrell	
J A N U A R Y	30	You Got Served	Screen Gems	Chris Stokes (director/screenplay); Omarion Grandberry, Marques Houston, Jennifer Freeman, Jarell Houston, De'Mario Thornton, Dreux Frédéric, Michael Taliferro, Alani Vazquez, Meagan Good, Steve Harvey, Christopher Jones, Jerome Jones, Robert Hoffman, Malcolm David Kelley, Jackee Harry, Wade Robson, Lil' Kim, Simon Rugala, Kevin Federline, Columbus Short, Harry Shum Jr., Clifford McGhee, Dyneisha Rollins, Mike Bodden, Aaron Davis	
F E B R U A R Y	6	Barbershop 2: Back in Business	Metro-Goldwyn-Mayer / Cubevision	Kevin Rodney Sullivan (director); Don D. Scott (screenplay); Ice Cube, Cedric the Entertainer, Sean Patrick Thomas, Eve, Troy Garity, Michael Ealy, Leonard Earl Howze, Harry Lennix, Robert Ray Wisdom, Jazsmin Lewis, Carl Wright, Garcelle Beauvais-Nilon, DeRay Davis, Kenan Thompson, Queen Latifah, Jackie Taylor, Parvesh Cheena, Tom Wright, Keke Palmer, Avant, Deon Cole, Janina Gavankar, Marcia Wright-Tillman	
F E B R U A R Y	6	Catch That Kid	20th Century Fox / Fox 2000 Pictures	Bart Freundlich (director); Michael Brandt, Derek Haas (screenplay); Kristen Stewart, Max Thieriot, Corbin Bleu, Jennifer Beals, Sam Robards, John Carroll Lynch, James LeGros, Michael Des Barres, Stark Sands, Christine Estabrook, Kevin G. Schmidt, Audrey Wasilewski	
F E B R U A R Y	6	Miracle	Walt Disney Pictures	Gavin O'Connor (director); Eric Guggenheim (screenplay); Kurt Russell, Patricia Clarkson, Noah Emmerich, Sean McCann, Kenneth Welsh, Eddie Cahill, Patrick O'Brien Demsey, Michael Mantenuto, Nathan West, Kenneth Mitchell, Eric Peter-Kaiser, Bobby Hanson, Joseph Cure, Billy Schneider, Nate Miller, Chris Koch, Kris Wilson, Stephen Kovalcik, Sam Skoryna, Pete Duffy, Nick Postle, Casey Burnette, Scott Johnson, Trevor Alto, Robbie MacGregor, Joe Hemsworth, Zinaid Memišević, Adam Knight	
F E B R U A R Y	13	50 First Dates	Columbia Pictures	Peter Segal (director); George Wing (screenplay); Adam Sandler, Drew Barrymore, Rob Schneider, Sean Astin, Blake Clark, Dan Aykroyd, Lusia Strus, Amy Hill, Allen Covert, Maya Rudolph, Nephi Pomaikai Brown, Peter Dante, Jonathan Loughran, J.D. Donaruma, Wayne Federman, Lynn Collins, Kristin Bauer, Jackie Titone, Katheryn Winnick, Kevin James, Missi Pyle, Anne Stedman	
F E B R U A R Y	15	Iron Jawed Angels	HBO Films	Katja von Garnier (director); Sally Robinson, Eugenia Bostwick-Singer, Raymond Singer, Jennifer Friedes (screenplay); Hilary Swank, Frances O'Connor, Julia Ormond, Anjelica Huston, Molly Parker, Laura Fraser, Lois Smith, Vera Farmiga, Brooke Smith, Patrick Dempsey, Margo Martindale, Bob Gunton, Carrie Snodgress, Adilah Barnes, Vinny Genna, Peter Berinato, Joseph Adams, Brett Boseman	
F E B R U A R Y	20	Against the Ropes	Paramount Pictures	Charles S. Dutton (director); Cheryl Edwards (screenplay); Meg Ryan, Omar Epps, Tony Shalhoub, Tim Daly, Kerry Washington, Charles S. Dutton, Joe Cortese, Dean McDermott, Skye McCole Bartusiak, Holt McCallany, Tory Kittles, Beau Starr, Diego Fuentes, Merwin Mondesir, Aidan Devine, Arnold Pinnock, Neven Pajkic, Dov Tiefenbach, Jackie Kallen, Tamara Hickey, Karen Robinson, Noah Danby, Michael Buffer, Sean Bell, Juan Carlos Hernandez, Gene Mack, Jared Durand, Angelo Tucci, Reg Dreger, Arturo Fresolone, Big Daddy Wayne, Hayley Verlyn, Moses Nyarko, Joel Harris, Michael Rhoades, Adrianne Keshock, Mike Kraft	
F E B R U A R Y	20	Clifford's Really Big Movie	Warner Bros. Pictures / Scholastic Entertainment / Big Red Dog Productions	Robert Ramirez (director): Rhett Reese, Robert Ramirez (screenplay); John Ritter, Wayne Brady, Kel Mitchell, Cree Summer, Judge Reinhold, Jenna Elfman, Wilmer Valderrama, Jess Harnell, John Goodman, Kath Soucie, Grey DeLisle	
F E B R U A R Y	20	Confessions of a Teenage Drama Queen	Walt Disney Pictures	Sara Sugarman (director); Gail Parent (screenplay); Lindsay Lohan, Adam Garcia, Glenne Headly, Alison Pill, Eli Marienthal, Megan Fox, Carol Kane, Sheila McCarthy, Tom McCamus, Ashley Leggat, Adam MacDonald, Pedro Miguel Arce, Richard Fitzpatrick, Sheila Sealy-Smith, Barbara Mamabolo, Maggie Oskam, Rachael Oskam, Connor Lynch	
F E B R U A R Y	20	EuroTrip	DreamWorks Pictures / The Montecito Picture Company	Jeff Schaffer (director/screenplay); Alec Berg, David Mandel (screenplay); Scott Mechlowicz, Jacob Pitts, Michelle Trachtenberg, Travis Wester, Jessica Boehrs, Vinnie Jones, Lucy Lawless, Patrick Malahide, Diedrich Bader, Fred Armisen, Kristin Kreuk, Matt Damon, J. P. Manoux, Rade Šerbedžija, Predrag Bjelac, Joanna Lumley, Nial Iskhakov	
F E B R U A R Y	20	Welcome to Mooseport	20th Century Fox	Donald Petrie (director); Doug Richardson (screenplay); Ray Romano, Gene Hackman, Marcia Gay Harden, Maura Tierney, Christine Baranski, Fred Savage, Rip Torn, Wayne Robson, Reagan Pasternak, June Squibb, John Rothman, Jayne Eastwood, Juan "Chi-Chi" Rodriguez, Jon Manfrellotti, Edward Herrmann	
F E B R U A R Y	25	The Passion of the Christ	Icon Productions	Mel Gibson (director/screenplay); Benedict Fitzgerald (screenplay); Jim Caviezel, Monica Bellucci, Claudia Gerini, Maia Morgenstern, Sergio Rubini, Christo Jivkov, Francesco De Vito, Mattia Sbragia, Toni Bertorelli, Luca Lionello, Hristo Naumov Shopov, Francesco Cabras, Rosalinda Celentano, Emilio De Marchi, Luca De Dominicis, Sabrina Impacciatore, Ted Rusoff, Fabio Sartor, Giacinto Ferro, Aleksander Mincer, Roberto Bestazoni, Giovanni Capalbo, Jarreth Merz, Matt Patresi, Chokri Ben Zagden, Pietro Sarubbi	
F E B R U A R Y	27	Club Dread	Fox Searchlight Pictures	Jay Chandrasekhar (director); Broken Lizard (screenplay); Jay Chandrasekhar, Kevin Heffernan, Steve Lemme, Paul Soter, Erik Stolhanske, Brittany Daniel, Jordan Ladd, M. C. Gainey, Lindsay Price, Bill Paxton, Julio Bekhor, Dan Montgomery, Jr., Elena Lyons, Tanja Reichert, Richard Perello, Ryan Falkner, Greg Cipes, Michael Weaver, Nat Faxon, Samm Levine, Jordan Ladd, Paco Mauri, Tony Amendola	
F E B R U A R Y	27	Twisted	Paramount Pictures / Kopelson Entertainment	Philip Kaufman (director); Sarah Thorp (screenplay); Ashley Judd, Samuel L. Jackson, Andy García, David Strathairn, Russell Wong, Camryn Manheim, Mark Pellegrino, Titus Welliver, D. W. Moffett, Richard T. Jones, Leland Orser, Leonard L. Thomas, Danny Lopez, Geoff Callan, Veronica Cartwright	
M A R C H	5	Hidalgo	Touchstone Pictures / Casey Silver Productions	Joe Johnston (director); John Fusco (screenplay); Viggo Mortensen, Omar Sharif, Louise Lombard, Saïd Taghmaoui, Peter Mensah, J. K. Simmons, Zuleikha Robinson, Adam Alexi-Malle, Silas Carson, Adoni Maropis, Floyd Red Crow Westerman, Elizabeth Berridge, C. Thomas Howell, Todd Kimsey, Malcolm McDowell, Harsh Nayyar, Victor Talmadge, Joshua Wolf Coleman, David Midthunder	
M A R C H	5	Starsky & Hutch	Warner Bros. Pictures / Dimension Films	Todd Phillips (director/screenplay); John O'Brien, Scot Armstrong (screenplay); Ben Stiller, Owen Wilson, Vince Vaughn, Juliette Lewis, Fred Williamson, Jason Bateman, Chris Penn, Carmen Electra, Amy Smart, Snoop Dogg, Molly Sims, Matt Walsh, George Cheung, Terry Crews, Brande Roderick, Jeffrey Lorenzo, Har Mar Superstar, Patton Oswalt, Paul Michael Glaser, David Soul, Will Ferrell, Dan Finnerty, Omar J. Dorsey, Richard Edson, Judah Friedlander, Bishop Don "Magic" Juan, Rachael Harris, Jernard Burks, Raymond Ma, Tangie Ambrose	
M A R C H	11	In My Country	Sony Pictures Classics / Phoenix Pictures	John Boorman (director); Antjie Krog, Ann Peacock (screenplay); Samuel L. Jackson, Juliette Binoche, Brendan Gleeson, Menzi Ngubane, Aletta Bezuidenhout, Langley Kirkwood, Charley Boorman, Lionel Newton, Owen Sejake	
M A R C H	12	Agent Cody Banks 2: Destination London	Metro-Goldwyn-Mayer	Kevin Allen (director); Don Rhymer (screenplay); Frankie Muniz, Anthony Anderson, Hannah Spearritt, Cynthia Stevenson, Daniel Roebuck, Anna Chancellor, Keith Allen, James Faulkner, Keith David, David Kelly, Santiago Segura, Connor Widdows, Paul Kaye, Julian Firth, Damien Hirst, Mark Williams, James Dreyfus, Patti Love, Henry Miller, Sam Douglas, Alfie Allen	
M A R C H	12	Secret Window	Columbia Pictures	David Koepp (director/screenplay); Johnny Depp, John Turturro, Maria Bello, Timothy Hutton, Charles S. Dutton, Len Cariou	
M A R C H	12	Spartan	Warner Bros. Pictures / Franchise Pictures	David Mamet (director/screenplay); Val Kilmer, Derek Luke, William H. Macy, Ed O'Neill, Kristen Bell, Tia Texada, Clark Gregg, Johnny Messner, Said Taghmaoui, Natalia Nogulich, Moshe Ivgy, Kick Gurry, Geoff Pierson, Aaron Stanford, Eric L. Haney, Alexandra Kerry, Andy Davoli, Mordechai Finley	
M A R C H	19	Dawn of the Dead	Universal Pictures	Zack Snyder (director); James Gunn (screenplay); Sarah Polley, Ving Rhames, Jake Weber, Ty Burrell, Mekhi Phifer, Michael Kelly, Kevin Zegers, Michael Barry, Lindy Booth, Jayne Eastwood, Boyd Banks, Inna Korobkina, R. D. Reid, Kim Poirier, Matt Frewer, Louis Ferreira, Hannah Lochner, Scott Reiniger, Tom Savini, Ken Foree, Bruce Bohne, Zack Snyder	
M A R C H	19	Eternal Sunshine of the Spotless Mind	Focus Features	Michel Gondry (director); Charlie Kaufman (screenplay); Jim Carrey, Kate Winslet, Kirsten Dunst, Tom Wilkinson, Mark Ruffalo, Elijah Wood, Jane Adams, David Cross, Deirdre O'Connell, Thomas Jay Ryan, Paulie Litt, Josh Flitter, Debbon Ayer	
M A R C H	19	Taking Lives	Warner Bros. Pictures / Village Roadshow Pictures / Atmosphere Pictures	D. J. Caruso (director); Jon Bokenkamp (screenplay); Angelina Jolie, Ethan Hawke, Kiefer Sutherland, Olivier Martinez, Tchéky Karyo, Jean-Hugues Anglade, Gena Rowlands, Paul Dano, Justin Chatwin, Billy Two Rivers, Julien Poulin, Marie-Josée Croze, Christian Tessier, André Lacoste, Richard Lemire, Emmanuel Bilodeau	
M A R C H	20	Mango Kiss	Wolfe Video	Sascha Rice (director/screenplay); Joe Mellis, Erin O'Malley (screenplay); Danièle Ferraro, Michelle Wolff, Sally Kirkland, Dru Mouser, Tina Marie Murray, Shannon Rossiter, Joe Mellis, Malia Spanyol, Windy Morgan Bunts, Dominique Zeltzman, Lena Zee, Alicia Simmons-Miracle, Laura Baca, Max Miller, Walter Barry	
M A R C H	26	Jersey Girl	Miramax Films / View Askew Productions	Kevin Smith (director/screenplay); Ben Affleck, Liv Tyler, George Carlin, Stephen Root, Mike Starr, Raquel Castro, Jason Biggs, Jennifer Lopez, Will Smith, Jason Lee, Matt Damon, S. Epatha Merkerson, Paulie Litt, Harley Quinn Smith, Matthew Maher	
M A R C H	26	The Ladykillers	Touchstone Pictures / Mike Zoss Productions	Joel Coen, Ethan Coen (directors/screenplay); Tom Hanks, Irma P. Hall, Marlon Wayans, J. K. Simmons, Tzi Ma, Ryan Hurst, Diane Delano, George Wallace, Stephen Root, Jason Weaver, Greg Grunberg, Blake Clark, Aldis Hodge, Jeremy Suarez, Bruce Campbell, John McConnell, George Anthony Bell, Robert Baker, Freda Foh Shen, Jennifer Echols	
M A R C H	26	Never Die Alone	Fox Searchlight Pictures	Ernest Dickerson (director); James Gibson (screenplay); DMX, David Arquette, Michael Ealy, Clifton Powell, Reagan Gomez-Preston, Jennifer Sky, Luenell, Drew Sidora, Antwon Tanner, Keesha Sharp, Tommy "Tiny" Lister Jr., Paige Hurd, Xavier Simmons	
M A R C H	26	Scooby-Doo 2: Monsters Unleashed	Warner Bros. Pictures / Mosaic Media Group	Raja Gosnell (director); James Gunn (screenplay); Freddie Prinze Jr., Sarah Michelle Gellar, Matthew Lillard, Linda Cardellini, Neil Fanning, Seth Green, Peter Boyle, Tim Blake Nelson, Alicia Silverstone, Karin Konoval, Joe Macleod, Brandon Jay McLaren, Rasmus Nøhr, Calum Worthy, C. Ernst Harth, Kevin Durand, Emily Tennant, Lauren Kennedy, Nazanin Afshin-Jam, Pat O'Brien, Tasmanian Devil, Ruben Studdard, Big Brovaz, J. P. Manoux, Scott McNeil, Dee Bradley Baker, Michael J. Sorich, Wally Wingert, Bob Papenbrook, Terrence Stone, Zahf Paroo, Stephen E. Miller, Christopher R. Sumpton	

== April–June ==
Opening		Title	Production company	Cast and crew	Ref.
A P R I L	1	Girl Play	Goff-Kellam Productions	Lee Friedlander (director/screenplay); Robin Greenspan, Lacie Harmon (screenplay); Robin Greenspan, Lacie Harmon, Mink Stole, Dom DeLuise, Katherine Randolph, Lauren Maher, Gina DeVivo, Shannon Perez, Dominic Ottersbach, Julie Briggs, Peter Ente, Graham T. McClusky	
A P R I L	2	Hellboy	Columbia Pictures / Revolution Studios	Guillermo del Toro (director/screenplay); Peter Briggs (screenplay); Ron Perlman, Selma Blair, Jeffrey Tambor, Karel Roden, Rupert Evans, Doug Jones, David Hyde Pierce, John Hurt, Brian Steele, Ladislav Beran, Bridget Hodson, Corey Johnson, William Hoyland, Angus MacInnes, Jim Howick, Brian Caspe, James Babson, Stephen Fisher	
A P R I L	2	Home on the Range	Walt Disney Pictures	Will Finn, John Sanford (directors/screenplay); Roseanne Barr, Judi Dench, Jennifer Tilly, Cuba Gooding Jr., Randy Quaid, Steve Buscemi, Charles Dennis, Charles Haid, Carole Cook, Joe Flaherty, Richard Riehle, Lance LeGault, G. W. Bailey, Dennis Weaver, Patrick Warburton, Estelle Harris, Governor Ann Richards, Marshall Efron, Mark Walton, Debi Derryberry, Troy Evans, Bill Farmer, Roger L. Jackson, Leslie Jordan, Edie McClurg, Phil Proctor, Eve Sabara, Jim Ward, Joe Whyte, Bruce A. Young, Roger Yuan	
A P R I L	2	The Prince & Me	Paramount Pictures / Lions Gate Films	Martha Coolidge (director); Jack Amiel, Michael Begler, Katherine Fugate (screenplay); Julia Stiles, Luke Mably, Ben Miller, James Fox, Miranda Richardson, Alberta Watson, Zachary Knighton, Stephen O'Reilly, Eliza Bennett, Devin Ratray, Yaani King, Eddie Irvine, Angelo Tsarouchas, Joanne Baron, Sarah Manninen, John Bourgeois, Elisabeth Waterston, Jacques Tourangeau, Clare Preuss, Stephen Singer, Tony Munch, Claus Bue	
A P R I L	2	Walking Tall	Metro-Goldwyn-Mayer	Kevin Bray (director); David Klass, Channing Gibson, David Levien, Brian Koppelman (screenplay); Dwayne "The Rock" Johnson, Johnny Knoxville, Neal McDonough, Michael Bowen, Kevin Durand, Kristen Wilson, Ashley Scott, Khleo Thomas, John Beasley, Cobie Smulders, Patrick Gallagher, Ryan Robbins, Michael Adamthwaite, Fred Keating, Kett Turton, Terence Kelly, Eric Keenleyside, Aaron Douglas, Michael Soltis, April Telek, Ben Cotton, Ty Olsson, Beverley Elliott, Mike Dopud	
A P R I L	7	Johnson Family Vacation	Fox Searchlight Pictures	Christopher Erskin (director); Todd R. Jones, Earl Richey Jones (screenplay); Cedric the Entertainer, Vanessa L. Williams, Bow Wow, Solange Knowles, Shannon Elizabeth, Steve Harvey, Christopher B. Duncan, Aloma Wright, Godfrey, Jason Momoa, Jennifer Freeman, Lee Garlington, Philip Daniel Bolden, Rodney Perry, Shari Headley, DeRay Davis, Kurupt, Tanjareen Martin, Gabby Soleil, Jeremiah "J.J." Williams Jr., Lorna Scott, Lichelli Lazar-Lea	
A P R I L	7	The Whole Ten Yards	Warner Bros. Pictures / Franchise Pictures / Cheyenne Enterprises	Howard Deutch (director); George Gallo (screenplay); Bruce Willis, Matthew Perry, Amanda Peet, Kevin Pollak, Natasha Henstridge, Frank Collison, Johnny Messner, Silas Weir Mitchell, Sione Faka'osilea, Tasha Smith, Samantha Harris	
A P R I L	9	The Alamo	Touchstone Pictures / Imagine Entertainment	John Lee Hancock (director); Leslie Bohem, Stephen Gaghan (screenplay); Dennis Quaid, Billy Bob Thornton, Jason Patric, Patrick Wilson, Jordi Mollà, Emilio Echevarría, Marc Blucas, Leon Rippy, Kevin Page, Stephen Bruton, Ricardo Antonio Chavira, Emily Deschanel, W. Earl Brown, Tom Everett, Rance Howard, Stewart Finlay-McLennan, Castulo Guerra, Rutherford Cravens, Dameon Clarke, Tom Davidson, Robert Prentiss, Joe Stevens, Laura Clifton, Brandon Smith, Francisco Philbert, Flavio Hinojosa, Michael Crabtree, Nathan Price	
A P R I L	9	Ella Enchanted	Miramax Films	Tommy O'Haver (director); Laurie Craig, Karen McCullah Lutz, Kirsten Smith, Jennifer Heath, Michele J. Wolff (screenplay); Anne Hathaway, Hugh Dancy, Cary Elwes, Vivica A. Fox, Joanna Lumley, Jimi Mistry, Steve Coogan, Heidi Klum, Minnie Driver, Patrick Bergin, Eric Idle, Aidan McArdle, Lucy Punch, Jennifer Higham, Jim Carter, Parminder Nagra, Donna Dent, Alvaro Lucchesi, Johnny Nguyen	
A P R I L	9	The Girl Next Door	20th Century Fox / Regency Enterprises	Luke Greenfield (director); Stuart Blumberg, David T. Wagner, Brent Goldberg (screenplay); Emile Hirsch, Elisha Cuthbert, Timothy Olyphant, James Remar, Chris Marquette, Paul Dano, Olivia Wilde, Sunny Leone, Amanda Swisten, Sung Hi Lee, Timothy Bottoms, Donna Bullock, Jacob Young, Matt Wiese	
A P R I L	16	Connie and Carla	Universal Pictures / Spyglass Entertainment	Michael Lembeck (director); Nia Vardalos (screenplay); Nia Vardalos, Toni Collette, David Duchovny, Stephen Spinella, Dash Mihok, Robert John Burke, Alec Mapa, Christopher Logan, Robert Kaiser, Ian Gomez, Boris McGiver, Nick Sandow, Chelah Horsdal, Debbie Reynolds, Greg Grunberg	
A P R I L	16	Kill Bill: Volume 2	Miramax Films	Quentin Tarantino (director/screenplay); Uma Thurman, David Carradine, Daryl Hannah, Michael Madsen, Michael Parks, Gordon Liu, Vivica A. Fox, Lucy Liu, Samuel L. Jackson, Bo Svenson, Jeannie Epper, Chris Nelson, Larry Bishop, Sid Haig, Perla Haney-Jardine, Julie Dreyfus, Sonny Chiba, Laura Cayouette, Clark Middleton, Lawrence Bender, Quentin Tarantino, Helen Kim, Stephanie L. Moore, Shana Stein, Caitlin Keats	
A P R I L	16	The Punisher	Lions Gate Films / Marvel Enterprises / Valhalla Motion Pictures	Jonathan Hensleigh (director/screenplay); Michael France (screenplay); Thomas Jane, John Travolta, Will Patton, Roy Scheider, Laura Harring, Ben Foster, Samantha Mathis, Rebecca Romijn-Stamos, John Pinette, Marcus Johns, Russell Andrews, James Carpinello, Eddie Jemison, Eduardo Yanez, Omar Avila, Kevin Nash, Mark Collie, Tom Nowicki, Veryl Jones, Marco St. John, Hank Stone	
A P R I L	23	13 Going on 30	Columbia Pictures / Revolution Studios	Gary Winick (director); Cathy Yuspa, Josh Goldsmith, Niels Mueller (screenplay); Jennifer Garner, Mark Ruffalo, Judy Greer, Andy Serkis, Kathy Baker, Phil Reeves, Lynn Collins, Kiersten Warren, Christa B. Allen, Sean Marquette, Alexandra Kyle, Ashley Benson, Brittany Curran, Brie Larson, Renee Olstead, Samuel Ball, Marcia DeBonis, Megan Lusk, Julia Roth	
A P R I L	23	Man on Fire	20th Century Fox / Fox 2000 Pictures / Scott Free Productions / Regency Enterprises	Tony Scott (director); Brian Helgeland (screenplay); Denzel Washington, Dakota Fanning, Christopher Walken, Giancarlo Giannini, Radha Mitchell, Marc Anthony, Rachel Ticotin, Mickey Rourke, Roberto Sosa, Jesus Ochoa, Gero Camilo, Mario Zaragoza	
A P R I L	30	Bobby Jones: Stroke of Genius	Film Foundry Releasing	Rowdy Herrington (director/screenplay); Bill Pryor, Tony DePaul (screenplay); Jim Caviezel, Claire Forlani, Jeremy Northam, Connie Ray, Brett Rice, Malcolm McDowell, Aidan Quinn, Dan Albright, Paul Freeman, Alistair Begg, Hilton McRae, Elizabeth Omilami, Brian F. Durkin, John Shepherd, Happy Lashelle, Allen O'Reilly, Robert Pralgo, Wilbur Fitzgerald, Ian Birse, Devon Gearhart, Bubba Lewis	
A P R I L	30	Envy	DreamWorks Pictures / Columbia Pictures / Castle Rock Entertainment / Baltimore/Spring Creek Pictures	Barry Levinson (director); Steve Adams (screenplay); Ben Stiller, Jack Black, Rachel Weisz, Amy Poehler, Christopher Walken, Ariel Gade, Sam Lerner, Angee Hughes, Blue Deckert, John Gavigan, Terry Bozeman, Tom McCleister, Ofer Samra, Tara Karsian, Ted Rooney, Kent Shocknek	
A P R I L	30	Godsend	Lions Gate Films / 2929 Entertainment	Nick Hamm (director); Mark Bomback (screenplay); Greg Kinnear, Rebecca Romijn-Stamos, Robert De Niro, Cameron Bright, Christopher Britton, Janet Bailey, Jake Simons, Elle Downs, Zoie Palmer, Devon Bostick, Munro Chambers	
A P R I L	30	Laws of Attraction	New Line Cinema	Peter Howitt (director); Robert Harling, Aline Brosh McKenna (screenplay); Pierce Brosnan, Julianne Moore, Michael Sheen, Parker Posey, Frances Fisher, Nora Dunn, Heather Ann Nurnberg, Johnny Myers, Mike Doyle, Allan Houston, Vincent Marzello, Marc Turtletaub, Gordon Sterne, Brette Taylor, Brendan Morrissey, Elva Crowley, David Wilmot, David Kelly, Sara Gilbert, Peter Howitt	
A P R I L	30	Mean Girls	Paramount Pictures	Mark Waters (director); Tina Fey (screenplay); Lindsay Lohan, Rachel McAdams, Tim Meadows, Ana Gasteyer, Amy Poehler, Tina Fey, Lacey Chabert, Lizzy Caplan, Daniel Franzese, Neil Flynn, Jonathan Bennett, Amanda Seyfried, Rajiv Surendra, Jonathan Malen, Daniel DeSanto, Diego Klattenhoff, Dwayne Hill, Alisha Morrison, Julia Chantrey, Sharron Matthews, Ely Henry, Laura de Carteret, Molly Shanahan, Ky Pham, Danielle Nguyen, Jan Caruana, Wai Choy, Jacky Chamberlain, Olympia Lukis, Stefanie Drummond, Tyson Fennell, Alexandra Stapley, Nicole Crimi, Dan Willmott, Clare Preuss	
M A Y	7	New York Minute	Warner Bros. Pictures	Dennie Gordon (director); Emily Fox, Adam Cooper, Bill Collage (screenplay); Mary-Kate Olsen, Ashley Olsen, Eugene Levy, Andy Richter, Jared Padalecki, Riley Smith, Andrea Martin, Drew Pinsky, Darrell Hammond, Mary Bond Davis, Bob Saget, Jack Osbourne, Joey Klein, Neil Crone, Garen Boyajian, Jonathan Wilson, Boyd Banks, H. Jon Benjamin, Frank Welker, Simple Plan, Naked Cowboy, Alannah Ong, Gala and Krissy, Thomas Gleadow	
M A Y	7	Super Size Me	Samuel Goldwyn Films / Roadside Attractions	Morgan Spurlock (director); Alexandra Jamieson	
M A Y	7	Van Helsing	Universal Pictures	Stephen Sommers (director/screenplay); Hugh Jackman, Kate Beckinsale, Richard Roxburgh, David Wenham, Will Kemp, Kevin J. O'Connor, Shuler Hensley, Alun Armstrong, Elena Anaya, Robbie Coltrane, Silvia Colloca, Josie Maran, Tom Fisher, Samuel West, Deep Roy, Martin Klebba, Stephen Fisher	
M A Y	14	Breakin' All the Rules	Screen Gems	Daniel Taplitz (director/screenplay); Jamie Foxx, Morris Chestnut, Gabrielle Union, Jennifer Esposito, Peter MacNicol, Bianca Lawson, Jill Ritchie, Danny Comden, Samantha Nagel, Octavia Spencer, Heather Headley, Patrick Cranshaw, Tate Taylor, Bob Stephenson, Faune Chambers	
M A Y	14	Coffee and Cigarettes	United Artists	Jim Jarmusch (director/screenplay); Roberto Benigni, Steven Wright, Joie Lee, Cinqué Lee, Steve Buscemi, Iggy Pop, Tom Waits, Joseph Rigano, Vinny Vella, Vinny Vella Jr., Renée French, E.J. Rodriguez, Alex Descas, Isaach De Bankolé, Cate Blanchett, Meg White, Jack White, Alfred Molina, Steve Coogan, GZA, RZA, Bill Murray, William Rice, Taylor Mead	
M A Y	14	A Slipping-Down Life	Lions Gate Films	Toni Kalem (director/screenplay); Lili Taylor, Guy Pearce, Irma P. Hall, John Hawkes, Veronica Cartwright, Marshall Bell, Johnny Goudie, Shawnee Smith, Sara Rue, Bruno Kirby, Tom Bower, Jo Ann Farabee, Harv Morgan, Jason Russell Waller, Lew Temple, Jason Kavalewitz	
M A Y	14	Troy	Warner Bros. Pictures	Wolfgang Petersen (director); David Benioff (screenplay); Brad Pitt, Eric Bana, Orlando Bloom, Diane Kruger, Brian Cox, Sean Bean, Brendan Gleeson, Saffron Burrows, Julie Christie, Peter O'Toole, Rose Byrne, Garrett Hedlund, John Shrapnel, Nigel Terry, James Cosmo, Julian Glover, Vincent Regan, Trevor Eve, Tyler Mane, Nathan Jones	
M A Y	19	Shrek 2	DreamWorks Animation / PDI/DreamWorks	Andrew Adamson (director/screenplay); Kelly Asbury, Conrad Vernon (directors); Joe Stillman, J. David Stern, David N. Weiss (screenplay); Mike Myers, Eddie Murphy, Cameron Diaz, Julie Andrews, Antonio Banderas, John Cleese, Rupert Everett, Jennifer Saunders, Aron Warner, Kelly Asbury, Cody Cameron, Conrad Vernon, Christopher Knights, Mark Moseley, Larry King, Chris Miller, Joan Rivers, Andrew Adamson, Bob Bergen, Rodger Bumpass, Robert Clotworthy, Jennifer Darling, Debi Derryberry, Paul Eiding, Iake Eissinmann, Bill Farmer, Bridget Hoffman, Sherry Lynn, Danny Mann, Mickie McGowan, Edie Mirman, Laraine Newman, Paul Pape, Jan Rabson, Marcelo Tubert, Conrad Vernon, Jim Ward	
M A Y	21	Stateside	Samuel Goldwyn Films	Reverge Anselmo (director/screenplay); Rachael Leigh Cook, Jonathan Tucker, Agnes Bruckner, Val Kilmer, Joe Mantegna, Carrie Fisher, Diane Venora, Ed Begley Jr., Michael Godere, Daniel Franzese, Paul Le Mat, Billy Lush, Brian Geraghty, George DiCenzo, Stuart Greer, Peter Jurasik, David Walton, Tony Hale, Brett Claywell, Penny Marshall, Zena Grey, Bridget Barkan, Joanne Pankow, Caryn Greenhut, Kip Weeks	
M A Y	21	Twist	Strand Releasing	Jacob Tierney (director/screenplay); Nick Stahl, Joshua Close, Gary Farmer, Tygh Runyan, Stephen McHattie, Andre Noble, Maxwell McCabe-Lokos, Mike Lobel, Michèle-Barbara Pelletier, Moti Yona, Brigid Tierney, Josh Holliday, Dave Graham	
M A Y	28	Baadasssss!	Sony Pictures Classics	Mario Van Peebles (director/screenplay); Dennis Haggerty (screenplay); Mario Van Peebles, Joy Bryant, Ossie Davis, David Alan Grier, Nia Long, Paul Rodriguez, Saul Rubinek, Khleo Thomas, Rainn Wilson, T. K. Carter, Terry Crews, Vincent Schiavelli, Karimah Westbrook, Len Lesser, Sally Struthers, Jazsmin Lewis, Adam West, Robert Peters, Glenn Plummer, Khalil Kain, Pamela Gordon, Wesley Jonathan, Joseph Culp, John Singleton, Penny Bae Bridges, Mandela Van Peebles, Keith Diamond, David Alan Smith	
M A Y	28	The Day After Tomorrow	20th Century Fox / Centropolis Entertainment	Roland Emmerich (director/screenplay); Jeffrey Nachmanoff (screenplay); Dennis Quaid, Jake Gyllenhaal, Ian Holm, Emmy Rossum, Sela Ward, Dash Mihok, Kenneth Welsh, Jay O. Sanders, Austin Nichols, Perry King, Tamlyn Tomita, Nestor Serrano, Glenn Plummer, Adrian Lester, Sheila McCarthy, Arjay Smith, Christopher Britton, Sasha Roiz, Amy Sloan, Christian Tessier, Lauren Sanchez, J. P. Manoux, Aaron Lustig, Tim Bagley	
M A Y	28	Raising Helen	Touchstone Pictures / Beacon Pictures	Garry Marshall (director); Jack Amiel, Michael Begler (screenplay); Kate Hudson, John Corbett, Joan Cusack, Hayden Panettiere, Spencer Breslin, Abigail Breslin, Helen Mirren, Sakina Jaffrey, Kevin Kilner, Paris Hilton, Felicity Huffman, Sean O'Bryan, Amber Valletta, Joseph Mazzello, Katie Carr, Hector Elizondo, Larry Miller, Shakara Ledard, Ethan Browne, Michael Esparza	
M A Y	28	Saved!	United Artists	Brian Dannelly (director/screenplay); Michael Urban (screenplay); Jena Malone, Mandy Moore, Macaulay Culkin, Patrick Fugit, Heather Matarazzo, Eva Amurri, Martin Donovan, Mary-Louise Parker, Chad Faust, Elizabeth Thai, Kett Turton, Nicki Clyne, Aaron Douglas, Greg Kean, Joe MacLeod, Dave Rosin, Valerie Bertinelli	
M A Y	28	Soul Plane	Metro-Goldwyn-Mayer	Jessy Terrero (director); Bo Zenga, Chuck Wilson (screenplay); Tom Arnold, Kevin Hart, Method Man, Snoop Dogg, K. D. Aubert, Godfrey, Brian Hooks, D. L. Hughley, Arielle Kebbel, Mo'Nique, Ryan Pinkston, Missi Pyle, Sommore, Sofía Vergara, Gary Anthony Williams, John Witherspoon, Loni Love, Cynthia Pinot, Angell Conwell, Roberto Roman, Terry Crews, Richard T. Jones, Lil Jon, Ying Yang Twins, Karl Malone	
M A Y	30	Something the Lord Made	HBO Films	Joseph Sargent (director); Peter Silverman, Robert Caswell (screenplay); Alan Rickman, Mos Def, Kyra Sedgwick, Gabrielle Union, Merritt Wever, Clayton LeBouef, Charles S. Dutton, Mary Stuart Masterson, Lyndon B. Johnson, John F. Kennedy, Martin Luther King, Malcolm X	
J U N E	2	Donnie Darko (Director's Cut) (re-release)	Newmarket Films / Pandora Cinema	Richard Kelly (director/screenplay); Jake Gyllenhaal, Jena Malone, Drew Barrymore, James Duval, Beth Grant, Maggie Gyllenhaal, Mary McDonnell, Holmes Osborne, Katharine Ross, Patrick Swayze, Noah Wyle, Alex Greenwald, Seth Rogen, Stuart Stone, Daveigh Chase, Patience Cleveland, Jolene Purdy, Arthur Taxier, David St. James, Tiler Peck, Lisa K. Wyatt, Jack Salvatore Jr., Lee Weaver, Ashley Tisdale, Jerry Trainor, Fran Kranz, Scotty Leavenworth, Michael Dukakis, Gary Lundy, David Moreland, Jazzie Mahannah, Kristina Malota, Marina Malota, Carly Naples, Rachel Winfree, Phyllis Lyons	
J U N E	4	Harry Potter and the Prisoner of Azkaban	Warner Bros. Pictures / Heyday Films	Alfonso Cuarón (director); Steve Kloves (screenplay); Daniel Radcliffe, Rupert Grint, Emma Watson, Michael Gambon, Maggie Smith, David Thewlis, Gary Oldman, Timothy Spall, Robbie Coltrane, Alan Rickman, Emma Thompson, Julie Christie, Julie Walters, Mark Williams, Richard Griffiths, Fiona Shaw, David Bradley, Devon Murray, Tom Felton, Bonnie Wright, Dawn French, Paul Whitehouse, Adrian Rawlins, Geraldine Somerville, Pam Ferris, Domhnall Gleeson, Harry Melling, Robert Hardy, Oliver Phelps, James Phelps, Chris Rankin, Matthew Lewis, Bronson Webb, Alfred Enoch, Afshan Azad, Shefali Chowdhury	
J U N E	11	The Chronicles of Riddick	Universal Pictures	David Twohy (director/screenplay); Vin Diesel, Thandie Newton, Karl Urban, Colm Feore, Linus Roache, Keith David, Yorick van Wageningen, Alexa Davalos, Nick Chinlund, Judi Dench, Kim Hawthorne, Christina Cox, Peter Williams, Alexis Llewellyn	
J U N E	11	Garfield: The Movie	20th Century Fox / Davis Entertainment	Pete Hewitt (director); Joel Cohen, Alec Sokolow (screenplay); Breckin Meyer, Jennifer Love Hewitt, Bill Murray, Stephen Tobolowsky, Evan Arnold, Mark Christopher Lawrence, Eve Brent, Juliette Goglia, Evan Helmuth, Joe Bays, Leyna Nguyen, Joe Ochman, Rufus Gifford, Alan Cumming, Nick Cannon, David Eigenberg, Brad Garrett, Jimmy Kimmel, Debra Messing, Richard Kind, Debra Jo Rupp, Wyatt Smith, Jordan Kaiser, Alyson Stoner	
J U N E	11	Napoleon Dynamite	Fox Searchlight Pictures / Paramount Pictures / MTV Films	Jared Hess (director/screenplay); Jerusha Hess (screenplay); Jon Heder, Jon Gries, Aaron Ruell, Efren Ramirez, Tina Majorino, Diedrich Bader, Sandy Martin, Haylie Duff, Emily Kennard, Shondrella Avery, Ellen Dubin, Trevor Snarr	
J U N E	11	The Stepford Wives	Paramount Pictures / DreamWorks Pictures	Frank Oz (director); Paul Rudnick (screenplay); Nicole Kidman, Matthew Broderick, Bette Midler, Christopher Walken, Roger Bart, Faith Hill, Jon Lovitz, Glenn Close, Matt Malloy, David Marshall Grant, Kate Shindle, Lorri Bagley, Robert Stanton, Mike White, KaDee Strickland, Larry King, Meredith Vieira, Billy Bush, Mary Beth Peil, Dylan Hartigan, Lisa Masters, Christopher Evan Welch, Jason Kravits, C. S. Lee, Andrea Anders, Carrie Preston, Tanoai Reed, Rick Holmes	
J U N E	16	Around the World in 80 Days	Walt Disney Pictures / Walden Media	Frank Coraci (director); David Titcher, David Benullo, David Goldstein (screenplay); Jackie Chan, Steve Coogan, Cécile de France, Jim Broadbent, Ewen Bremner, Kathy Bates, Arnold Schwarzenegger, Ian McNeice, Karen Joy Morris, Roger Hammond, David Ryall, Mark Addy, Richard Branson, John Cleese, Will Forte, Macy Gray, Sammo Hung, Rob Schneider, Luke Wilson, Owen Wilson, Daniel Wu, Robert Fyfe, Adam Godley, Ken Lo, Maggie Q, Phil Meheux, Michael Youn, Frank Coraci, Don Tai, Mars, Johnny Cheung, Guang Chang, Han Guan Hua	
J U N E	18	Dodgeball: A True Underdog Story	20th Century Fox	Rawson Marshall Thurber (director/screenplay); Vince Vaughn, Ben Stiller, Christine Taylor, Rip Torn, Hank Azaria, Gary Cole, Justin Long, Missi Pyle, Alan Tudyk, Stephen Root, Joel David Moore, Chris Williams, Jamal Duff, Jason Bateman, William Shatner, Julie Gonzalo, Rusty Joiner, Curtis Armstrong, Scarlett Chorvat, Lori Beth Denberg, Cayden Boyd, Bob Cicherillo, Patton Oswalt, Lance Armstrong, Chuck Norris, David Hasselhoff, Trever O'Brien, Kevin Porter, Brandon Molale	
J U N E	18	The Terminal	DreamWorks Pictures / Amblin Entertainment	Steven Spielberg (director); Sacha Gervasi, Jeff Nathanson (screenplay); Tom Hanks, Catherine Zeta-Jones, Stanley Tucci, Chi McBride, Diego Luna, Barry Shabaka Henley, Kumar Pallana, Zoe Saldaña, Eddie Jones, Jude Ciccolella, Corey Reynolds, Guillermo Diaz, Rini Bell, Valery Nikolaev, Michael Nouri, Benny Golson, Scott Adsit, Dan Finnerty	
J U N E	20	Salem's Lot	TNT / Warner Bros. Television	Mikael Salomon (director); Peter Filardi (screenplay); Rob Lowe, Andre Braugher, Donald Sutherland, Samantha Mathis, Robert Mammone, Dan Byrd, Rutger Hauer, James Cromwell, Tara Morice, Andy Anderson, Robert Grubb, Penny McNamee, Steven Vidler, Brendan Cowell, Todd MacDonald, André De Vanny, Rebecca Gibney, Bree Desborough, Elizabeth Alexander, Julia Blake, Martin Vaughan, Queenie van de Zandt, Nicholas Bell, Christopher Morris, Paul Ashcroft, Zac Richmond, Joe Petruzzi, Daniel Smorgon	
J U N E	22	Scooby-Doo! and the Loch Ness Monster	Warner Home Video / Warner Bros. Animation / Renegade Animation / Yowza! Animation	Scott Jeralds, Joe Sichta (directors); George Doty IV, Ed Scharlach, Mark Turosz (screenplay); Frank Welker, Casey Kasem, Mindy Cohn, Grey DeLisle, Michael Bell, Jeff Bennett, John DiMaggio, Phil LaMarr, Sheena Easton	
J U N E	23	White Chicks	Columbia Pictures / Revolution Studios	Keenen Ivory Wayans (director/screenplay); Shawn Wayans, Marlon Wayans, Andrew McElfresh, Michael Anthony Snowden, Xavier Cook (screenplay); Marlon Wayans, Shawn Wayans, Jaime King, Frankie Faison, Lochlyn Munro, John Heard, Busy Philipps, Terry Crews, Brittany Daniel, Jessica Cauffiel, Rochelle Aytes, Jennifer Carpenter, Eddie Velez, Maitland Ward, Anne Dudek, Faune A. Chambers, John Reardon, Steven Grayhm, Casey Lee, Drew Sidora, David Lewis, Heather McDonald, Brad Loree, Evangeline Lilly	
J U N E	25	Fahrenheit 9/11	Lions Gate Films	Michael Moore (director/screenplay); Michael Moore	
J U N E	25	The Notebook	New Line Cinema	Nick Cassavetes (director); Jeremy Leven (screenplay); Ryan Gosling, Rachel McAdams, James Garner, Gena Rowlands, James Marsden, Kevin Connolly, Sam Shepard, Joan Allen, Jamie Brown, David Thornton, Heather Wahlquist, Ed Grady, Obba Babatunde, Mark Johnson	
J U N E	30	Spider-Man 2	Columbia Pictures / Marvel Enterprises	Sam Raimi (director); Alvin Sargent (screenplay); Tobey Maguire, Kirsten Dunst, James Franco, Alfred Molina, Rosemary Harris, J. K. Simmons, Donna Murphy, Daniel Gillies, Bruce Campbell, Stan Lee, Dylan Baker, Willem Dafoe, Elizabeth Banks, Bill Nunn, Ted Raimi, Mageina Tovah, Cliff Robertson, Joel McHale, Daniel Dae Kim, Aasif Mandvi, Vanessa Ferlito, Joy Bryant, Phil LaMarr, Scott Spiegel, Molly Cheek, Joanne Baron, Bonnie Somerville, Elya Baskin, Hal Sparks, Emily Deschanel, Peyton List	

== July–September ==
Opening		Title	Production company	Cast and crew	Ref.
J U L Y	2	America's Heart and Soul	Walt Disney Pictures / Blacklight Films	Louis Schwartzberg (director/screenplay);	
J U L Y	2	Before Sunset	Warner Independent Pictures / Castle Rock Entertainment	Richard Linklater (director/screenplay); Julie Delpy, Ethan Hawke (screenplay); Ethan Hawke, Julie Delpy	
J U L Y	2	The Clearing	Fox Searchlight Pictures	Pieter Jan Brugge (director/screenplay); Justin Haythe (screenplay); Robert Redford, Helen Mirren, Willem Dafoe, Alessandro Nivola, Matt Craven, Melissa Sagemiller, Wendy Crewson, Larry Pine, Diana Scarwid	
J U L Y	2	De-Lovely	Metro-Goldwyn-Mayer	Irwin Winkler (director); Jay Cocks (screenplay); Kevin Kline, Ashley Judd, Jonathan Pryce, Kevin McNally, Sandra Nelson, Allan Corduner, Peter Polycarpou, Keith Allen, James Wilby, Kevin McKidd, Richard Dillane, John Barrowman, Peter Jessop, Edward Baker-Duly, Jeff Harding, Caroline O'Connor, Lara Fabian, Cole Porter, Robbie Williams, Lemar, Elvis Costello, Alanis Morissette, Sheryl Crow, Mick Hucknall, Diana Krall, Vivian Green, Mario Frangoulis, Natalie Cole	
J U L Y	7	King Arthur	Touchstone Pictures / Jerry Bruckheimer Films	Antoine Fuqua (director); David Franzoni (screenplay); Clive Owen, Keira Knightley, Ioan Gruffudd, Stephen Dillane, Stellan Skarsgård, Ray Winstone, Hugh Dancy, Ray Stevenson, Til Schweiger, Mads Mikkelsen, Ken Stott, Joel Edgerton, Sean Gilder, Pat Kinevane, Ivano Marescotti, Lorenzo De Angelis, Stefania Orsola Garello, Alan Devine, Charlie Creed-Miles, Johnny Brennan, David Murray, Dawn Bradfield, Maria Gladkowska	
J U L Y	9	Anchorman: The Legend of Ron Burgundy	DreamWorks Pictures / Apatow Productions	Adam McKay (director/screenplay); Will Ferrell (screenplay); Will Ferrell, Christina Applegate, Paul Rudd, Steve Carell, David Koechner, Fred Willard, Chris Parnell, Kathryn Hahn, Fred Armisen, Vince Vaughn, Jerry Minor, Laura Kightlinger, Danny Trejo, Jack Black, Judd Apatow, Paul F. Tompkins, Jay Johnston, Tim Robbins, Luke Wilson, Ben Stiller, Missi Pyle, Seth Rogen, Bill Kurtis, Adam McKay, Ian Roberts, Holmes Osborne, Shira Piven, Kent Shocknek, Joe Flaherty, Dave Allen, Jimmy Bennett, Jerry Stiller	
J U L Y	9	Sleepover	Metro-Goldwyn-Mayer	Joe Nussbaum (director); Elisa Bell (screenplay); Alexa Vega, Mika Boorem, Jane Lynch, Sam Huntington, Sara Paxton, Brie Larson, Steve Carell, Jeff Garlin, Scout Taylor-Compton, Kallie Flynn Childress, Sean Faris, Evan Peters, Ryan Slattery, Katija Pevec, Eileen April Boylan, Thad Luckinbill, Alice Greczyn, Hunter Parrish, Douglas Smith, Max Van Ville, Summer Glau, Johnny Sneed, Shane Hunter, Laura Monteiro	
J U L Y	14	The Door in the Floor	Focus Features	Tod Williams (director/screenplay); Jeff Bridges, Kim Basinger, Jon Foster, Bijou Phillips, Elle Fanning, Mimi Rogers, Donna Murphy, John Rothman, Harvey Loomis	
J U L Y	16	A Cinderella Story	Warner Bros. Pictures / Gaylord Films	Mark Rosman (director); Leigh Dunlap (screenplay); Hilary Duff, Chad Michael Murray, Jennifer Coolidge, Dan Byrd, Regina King, Madeline Zima, Andrea Avery, Julie Gonzalo, Whip Hubley, Brad Bufanda, Simon Helberg, J. D. Pardo, Erica Hubbard, Kady Cole, Aimee Lynn Chadwick, Lin Shaye, Kevin Kilner, Mary Pat Gleason, Paul Rodriguez, James Eckhouse, Jonathan Slavin, John Billingsley, Art LaFleur	
J U L Y	16	I, Robot	20th Century Fox / Davis Entertainment	Alex Proyas (director); Jeff Vintar, Akiva Goldsman (screenplay); Will Smith, Bridget Moynahan, Bruce Greenwood, James Cromwell, Chi McBride, Shia LaBeouf, Alan Tudyk, Fiona Hogan, Terry Chen, Jerry Wasserman, Peter Shinkoda, Sharon Wilkins, Darren Moore, Aaron Douglas, Emily Tennant, Adrian L. Ricard, Craig March, Kyanna Cox, Angela Moore, David Haysom, Scott Heindl	
J U L Y	23	The Bourne Supremacy	Universal Pictures / The Kennedy/Marshall Company	Paul Greengrass (director); Tony Gilroy (screenplay); Matt Damon, Franka Potente, Brian Cox, Julia Stiles, Karl Urban, Gabriel Mann, Joan Allen, Marton Csokas, Karel Roden, Tomas Arana, Tom Gallop, Michelle Monaghan, Oksana Akinshina	
J U L Y	23	Catwoman	Warner Bros. Pictures / Village Roadshow Pictures	Pitof (director); John Brancato, Michael Ferris, John Rogers (screenplay); Halle Berry, Benjamin Bratt, Sharon Stone, Lambert Wilson, Frances Conroy, Alex Borstein, Michael Massee, Byron Mann, Kim Smith, Peter Wingfield, Missy Peregrym, Alex Cooper, Berend McKenzie	
J U L Y	23	A Home at the End of the World	Warner Independent Pictures	Michael Mayer (director); Michael Cunningham (screenplay); Colin Farrell, Robin Wright Penn, Dallas Roberts, Sissy Spacek, Matt Frewer, Erik Scott Smith, Harris Allan, Asia Vieira	
J U L Y	28	Garden State	Fox Searchlight Pictures / Miramax Films / Jersey Films / Camelot Pictures	Zach Braff (director/screenplay); Zach Braff, Natalie Portman, Peter Sarsgaard, Ian Holm, Jean Smart, Armando Riesco, Jackie Hoffman, Method Man, Alex Burns, Ron Leibman, Denis O'Hare, Jim Parsons, Michael Weston, Ann Dowd, Ato Essandoh, Geoffrey Arend	
J U L Y	30	Harold & Kumar Go to White Castle	New Line Cinema	Danny Leiner (director); Jon Hurwitz, Hayden Schlossberg (screenplay); John Cho, Kal Penn, Neil Patrick Harris, Paula Garcés, Ryan Reynolds, David Krumholtz, Eddie Kaye Thomas, Brooke D'Orsay, Kate Kelton, Steve Braun, Christopher Meloni, Fred Willard, Robert Tinkler, Anthony Anderson, Malin Åkerman, Dov Tiefenbach, Gary Anthony Williams, Boyd Banks, Craig Stevens, Jamie Kennedy, Ethan Embry, Sandy Jobin-Bevans, Siu Ta, Gary Archibald	
J U L Y	30	She Hate Me	Sony Pictures Classics / 40 Acres and a Mule Filmworks	Spike Lee (director/screenplay); Anthony Mackie, Kerry Washington, Ellen Barkin, Monica Bellucci, Jim Brown, Jamel Debbouze, Brian Dennehy, Woody Harrelson, Bai Ling, Q-Tip, Dania Ramirez, John Turturro, Lonette McKee, Michael Genet, Ossie Davis, David Bennent, Joie Lee, Chiwetel Ejiofor, Michole Briana White, Paula Jai Parker, Sarita Choudhury, Isiah Whitlock, Lemon, Kim Director, Rick Aiello, Don Harvey	
J U L Y	30	The Manchurian Candidate	Paramount Pictures	Jonathan Demme (director); Daniel Pyne, Dean Georgaris (screenplay); Denzel Washington, Meryl Streep, Liev Schreiber, Jon Voight, Kimberly Elise, Ted Levine, Vera Farmiga, Jeffrey Wright, Simon McBurney, Bruno Ganz, Ann Dowd, Miguel Ferrer, Dean Stockwell, Charles Napier, Jude Ciccolella, Tom Stechschulte, Pablo Schreiber, Anthony Mackie, Robyn Hitchcock, Obba Babatundé, Željko Ivanek, John Bedford Lloyd, Al Franken, Sidney Lumet, Anna Deavere Smith, Roy Blount Jr., Fab Five Freddy, Roger Corman, Beau Sia, Gayle King	
J U L Y	30	Thunderbirds	Universal Pictures / StudioCanal / Working Title Films	Jonathan Frakes (director); William Osborne, Michael McCullers (screenplay); Brady Corbet, Bill Paxton, Anthony Edwards, Ben Kingsley, Vanessa Anne Hudgens, Sophia Myles, Ron Cook, Philip Winchester, Lex Shrapnel, Dominic Colenso, Harvey Virdi, Deobia Oparei, Rose Keegan, Soren Fulton, Ben Torgersen, Bhasker Patel	
J U L Y	30	The Village	Touchstone Pictures / Blinding Edge Pictures	M. Night Shyamalan (director/screenplay); Joaquin Phoenix, Bryce Dallas Howard, Adrien Brody, Sigourney Weaver, William Hurt, Brendan Gleeson, Judy Greer, Cherry Jones, Celia Weston, Frank Collison, Jayne Atkinson, Fran Kranz, Michael Pitt, Jesse Eisenberg, M. Night Shyamalan, Charlie Hofheimer, Liz Stauber, Joey Anaya, Kevin Foster	
A U G U S T	6	Collateral	DreamWorks Pictures / Paramount Pictures / Parkes/MacDonald Productions	Michael Mann (director); Stuart Beattie (screenplay); Tom Cruise, Jamie Foxx, Jada Pinkett Smith, Mark Ruffalo, Peter Berg, Bruce McGill, Irma P. Hall, Barry Shabaka Henley, Richard T. Jones, Klea Scott, Bodhi Elfman, Debi Mazar, Javier Bardem, Emilio Rivera, Thomas Rosales Jr., Jason Statham, Inmo Yuon, Angelo Tiffe, Steven Kozlowski, Jamie McBride	
A U G U S T	6	Little Black Book	Columbia Pictures / Revolution Studios	Nick Hurran (director); Melissa Carter, Elisa Bell (screenplay); Brittany Murphy, Holly Hunter, Ron Livingston, Julianne Nicholson, Stephen Tobolowsky, Kathy Bates, Kevin Sussman, Rashida Jones, Josie Maran, Dan Benson, Dave Annable, Sharon Lawrence, Gavin Rossdale, Yvette Nicole Brown, Marshall Allman, Ben Ziff, Johnny Pacar, Carly Simon	
A U G U S T	6	Open Water	Lions Gate Films	Chris Kentis (director/screenplay); Blanchard Ryan, Daniel Travis	
A U G U S T	11	The Princess Diaries 2: Royal Engagement	Walt Disney Pictures	Garry Marshall (director); Shonda Rhimes (screenplay); Anne Hathaway, Julie Andrews, Héctor Elizondo, Heather Matarazzo, John Rhys-Davies, Callum Blue, Chris Pine, Caroline Goodall, Tom Poston, Kim Thomson, Raven-Symoné, Larry Miller, Sean O'Bryan, Matthew Walker, Spencer Breslin, Elinor Donahue, Shea Curry, Scott Marshall, Abigail Breslin, Isabella Hofmann, Stan Lee, Kathleen Marshall, Joel McCrary, Anna A. White, Cassie Rowell, Erik Bragg	
A U G U S T	13	Alien vs. Predator	20th Century Fox	Paul W. S. Anderson (director/screenplay); Sanaa Lathan, Raoul Bova, Lance Henriksen, Ewen Bremner, Colin Salmon, Tommy Flanagan, Carsten Norgaard, Agathe de La Boulaye, Sam Troughton, Petr Jákl, Liz May Brice, Karima Adebibe, Tom Woodruff Jr., Ian Whyte, Joseph Rye	
A U G U S T	13	Yu-Gi-Oh! The Movie: Pyramid of Light	Warner Bros. Pictures / 4Kids Entertainment	Hatsuki Tsuji (director); Junki Takegami, Yoshihiko Masahiro Kubo, Michael Pecerlello, Norman J. Grossfeld (screenplay); Dan Green, Eric Stuart, Wayne Grayson, Frank Frankson, Amy Birnbaum, Tara Jayne, Maddie Blaustein, Darren Dunstan, Scottie Ray	
A U G U S T	17	Mickey, Donald, Goofy: The Three Musketeers	Walt Disney Home Entertainment	Donovan Cook (director); Evan Spiliotopoulos, David M. Evans (screenplay); Wayne Allwine, Tony Anselmo, Bill Farmer, Russi Taylor, Tress MacNeille, Jim Cummings, April Winchell, Jeff Bennett, Maurice LaMarche, Rob Paulsen, Frank Welker, Kirk Baily, Cam Clarke, Nicholas Guest, Claudette Wells, Trevor Devall	
A U G U S T	20	Exorcist: The Beginning	Warner Bros. Pictures / Morgan Creek Productions	Renny Harlin (director); Alexi Hawley (screenplay); Stellan Skarsgård, Izabella Scorupco, James D'Arcy, Alan Ford, Ben Cross, Ralph Brown, Julian Wadham, David Bradley, Antonie Kamerling, Israel Aduramo, Patrick O'Kane, Rupert Degas, Andrew French, Remy Sweeney, Eddie Osei, James Bellamy	
A U G U S T	20	Without a Paddle	Paramount Pictures	Steven Brill (director); Jay Leggett, Mitch Rouse (screenplay); Seth Green, Matthew Lillard, Dax Shepard, Bonnie Somerville, Ethan Suplee, Abraham Benrubi, Ray Baker, Rachel Blanchard, Burt Reynolds, Christina Moore, Antony Starr, Scott Adsit, Danielle Cormack, Bart the Bear 2	
A U G U S T	27	Anacondas: The Hunt for the Blood Orchid	Screen Gems	Dwight H. Little (director); John Claflin, Daniel Zelman, Michael Miner, Edward Neumeier (screenplay); Johnny Messner, KaDee Strickland, Matthew Marsden, Eugene Byrd, Salli Richardson-Whitfield, Nicholas Gonzalez, Karl Yune, Morris Chestnut, Andy Anderson	
A U G U S T	27	Suspect Zero	Paramount Pictures / Intermedia Films	E. Elias Merhige (director); Zak Penn, Billy Ray (screenplay); Aaron Eckhart, Ben Kingsley, Carrie-Anne Moss, Kevin Chamberlin, Harry Lennix	
A U G U S T	27	Hero	Miramax Films / Sil-Metropole Organisation / China Film Group Corporation	Zhang Yimou (director); Feng Li, Bin Wang, Zhang Yimou (screenplay); Jet Li, Tony Leung, Maggie Cheung, Zhang Ziyi, Donnie Yen, Chen Daoming	
A U G U S T	27	The Brown Bunny	Wellspring / Wild Bunch	Vincent Gallo (director/screenplay); Vincent Gallo, Chloë Sevigny	
S E P T E M B E R	1	Vanity Fair	Focus Features	Mira Nair (director); Matthew Faulk, Mark Skeet, Julian Fellowes (screenplay); Reese Witherspoon, Eileen Atkins, Jim Broadbent, Gabriel Byrne, Romola Garai, Bob Hoskins, Rhys Ifans, James Purefoy, Jonathan Rhys Meyers, Sophie Hunter, Geraldine McEwan, Douglas Hodge, Natasha Little, John Woodvine, Barbara Leigh-Hunt, Nicholas Jones, Sian Thomas, Trevor Cooper, Kelly Hunter, Camilla Rutherford, Alexandra Staden, Tony Maudsley, John Franklyn-Robbins, Deborah Findlay, Daniel Hay, Tom Sturridge, Kathryn Drysdale, Ruth Sheen, Richard McCabe, Gledis Cinque, William Melling	
S E P T E M B E R	3	The Cookout	Lions Gate Films	Lance Rivera (director); Laurie B. Turner, Ramsey Gbelawoe, Jeffrey Brian Holmes (screenplay); Tim Meadows, Eve, Ja Rule, Farrah Fawcett, Meagan Good, Storm P., Danny Glover, Queen Latifah, Jenifer Lewis, Jonathan Silverman, Ruperto Vanderpool, Frankie Faison, Vincent Pastore, Roberto Roman, Reg E. Cathey, Wilheim Lewis, Jerod Mixon, Jamal Mixon, Gerry Bamman, Wendy Williams, Mark Cuban, Marv Albert	
S E P T E M B E R	3	Paparazzi	20th Century Fox / Icon Productions	Paul Abascal (director); Forrest Smith (screenplay); Cole Hauser, Robin Tunney, Dennis Farina, Daniel Baldwin, Tom Sizemore, Tom Hollander, Kevin Gage, Forry Smith, Donal Gibson, Mel Gibson, Chris Rock, Vince Vaughn, Matthew McConaughey, Blake Michael Bryan	
S E P T E M B E R	3	Warriors of Heaven and Earth	Sony Pictures Classics / Columbia Pictures Film Production Asia	He Ping (director); He Ping, Zhang Rui (screenplay); Jiang Wen, Kiichi Nakai, Wang Xueqi, Zhao Wei, Hasi Bagen	
S E P T E M B E R	3	Wicker Park	Metro-Goldwyn-Mayer / Lakeshore Entertainment	Paul McGuigan (director); Brandon Boyce (screenplay); Josh Hartnett, Rose Byrne, Matthew Lillard, Diane Kruger, Jessica Paré, Christopher Cousins	
S E P T E M B E R	10	Cellular	New Line Cinema	David R. Ellis (director); Chris Morgan (screenplay); Kim Basinger, Chris Evans, Jason Statham, William H. Macy, Eric Christian Olsen, Noah Emmerich, Richard Burgi, Valerie Cruz, Jessica Biel, Caroline Aaron, Matt McColm, Eric Etebari, Rick Hoffman, Lin Shaye, Lauren Sánchez, Sherri Shepherd, Adam Taylor Gordon, Brendan Kelly	
S E P T E M B E R	10	Criminal	Warner Independent Pictures	Gregory Jacobs (director/screenplay); Mike Lowry (screenplay); John C. Reilly, Diego Luna, Maggie Gyllenhaal, Maeve Quinlan, Peter Mullan, Jonathan Tucker, Ellen Geer, Malik Yoba, Laura Ceron, Zitto Kazann	
S E P T E M B E R	10	Resident Evil: Apocalypse	Screen Gems	Alexander Witt (director); Paul W. S. Anderson (screenplay); Milla Jovovich, Sienna Guillory, Oded Fehr, Thomas Kretschmann, Jared Harris, Mike Epps, Sophie Vavasseur, Iain Glen, Razaaq Adoti, Sandrine Holt, Zack Ward, Matthew G. Taylor	
S E P T E M B E R	17	Mr. 3000	Touchstone Pictures / Dimension Films / Spyglass Entertainment	Charles Stone III (director); Eric Champnella, Keith Mitchell, Howard Michael Gould (screenplay); Bernie Mac, Angela Bassett, Paul Sorvino, Chris Noth, Michael Rispoli, Brian J. White, Ian Anthony Dale, Evan Jones, Amaury Nolasco, Dondre Whitfield, Earl Billings, Keegan-Michael Key, Neil Brown Jr., Scott Martin Brooks, John McConnell, Ric Reitz, Jaqueline Fleming, Tom Arnold, Ron Darling, Larry King, Tony Kornheiser, John Salley, Stuart Scott, Michael Wilbon, Jay Leno, Chris Rose, Peter Gammons, Bronzell Miller, J. Anthony Brown, John Schwab, Dick Enberg, Matt DeCaro, Mykel Shannon Jenkins, Marco St. John, Christian Stolte, Dane Cook, Carmen Electra	
S E P T E M B E R	17	Sky Captain and the World of Tomorrow	Paramount Pictures / Brooklyn Films / Filmauro	Kerry Conran (director/screenplay); Gwyneth Paltrow, Jude Law, Angelina Jolie, Giovanni Ribisi, Michael Gambon, Bai Ling, Omid Djalili, Laurence Olivier, Julian Curry, Trevor Baxter, Peter Law, Khan Bonfils	
S E P T E M B E R	17	Wimbledon	Universal Pictures / StudioCanal / Working Title Films	Richard Loncraine (director); Adam Brooks, Jennifer Flackett, Mark Levin (screenplay); Kirsten Dunst, Paul Bettany, Sam Neill, Jon Favreau, James McAvoy, Bernard Hill, Eleanor Bron, Celia Imrie, Nikolaj Coster-Waldau, Austin Nichols, Kirsten Taylor, Montjoy Hunter, Robert Lindsay, Martin Wimbush, Cecilia Dazzi, Dominic Inglot, Vikas Punna, Beti Sekulovski, Murphy Jensen, Alun Jones, Rebecca Dandeniya, John McEnroe, Chris Evert, Mary Carillo, John Barrett	
S E P T E M B E R	22	Georges Bataille's Story of the Eye	ARM/Cinema 25	Andrew Repasky McElhinney (director/co-screenplay); Melissa Elizabeth Forgione, Querelle Haynes, Sean Timothy Sexton, Courtney Shea, Claude Barrington While	
S E P T E M B E R	24	First Daughter	20th Century Fox / Regency Enterprises	Forest Whitaker (director); Jessica Bendinger, Kate Kondell (screenplay); Katie Holmes, Marc Blucas, Amerie, Michael Keaton, Margaret Colin, Lela Rochon Fuqua, Michael Milhoan, Dwayne Adway, Barry Livingston, Steve Tom, Peter White, Parry Shen, Marilyn McIntyre, Teck Holmes, Justine Wachsberger, Andy Umberger, Kent Shocknek, Vera Wang, Conan O'Brien, Joan Rivers, Melissa Rivers, Jay Leno, Forest Whitaker	
S E P T E M B E R	24	The Forgotten	Columbia Pictures / Revolution Studios	Joseph Ruben (director); Gerald Di Pego (screenplay); Julianne Moore, Dominic West, Gary Sinise, Alfre Woodard, Anthony Edwards, Jessica Hecht, Linus Roache, Lee Tergesen, Felix Solis, Robert Ray Wisdom, Tim Kang, Susan Misner, Ann Dowd, Kathryn Faughnan, J. Tucker Smith, Christopher Kovaleski	
S E P T E M B E R	24	The Last Shot	Touchstone Pictures / Mandeville Films	Jeff Nathanson (director/screenplay); Matthew Broderick, Alec Baldwin, Toni Collette, Calista Flockhart, Ray Liotta, Tim Blake Nelson, James Rebhorn, Tony Shalhoub, Stanley Anderson, W. Earl Brown, Ian Gomez, Buck Henry, Evan Jones, Tom McCarthy, Glenn Morshower, Jon Polito, Troy Winbush, Russell Means, Pat Morita, Joan Cusack, Robert Evans, Judy Greer, Eric Roberts, Shoshannah Stern	
S E P T E M B E R	24	The Motorcycle Diaries	Focus Features / FilmFour / BD Cine / Wildwood Enterprises, Inc.	Walter Salles (director); José Rivera (screenplay); Gael García Bernal, Rodrigo de la Serna, Mía Maestro, Mercedes Morán, Jean Pierre Noher, Facundo Espinosa, Sergio Boris, Brandon Cruz, Alberto Granado, Lucas Oro, Marina Glezer, Sofia Bertolotto, Franco Solazzi, Ricardo Díaz Mourelle, Daniel Cargieman, Diego Giorzi, Gustavo Bueno, Matías Strafe	
S E P T E M B E R	24	Shaun of the Dead	Rogue Pictures / StudioCanal / Working Title Films	Edgar Wright (director/screenplay); Simon Pegg (screenplay); Simon Pegg, Kate Ashfield, Lucy Davis, Nick Frost, Dylan Moran, Bill Nighy, Penelope Wilton, Jessica Stevenson, Peter Serafinowicz, Rafe Spall, Martin Freeman, Reece Shearsmith, Tamsin Greig, Julia Deakin, Matt Lucas	

== October–December ==
Opening		Title	Production company	Cast and crew	Ref.
O C T O B E R	1	I Heart Huckabees	Fox Searchlight Pictures / Scott Rudin Productions	David O. Russell (director/screenplay); Jeff Baena (screenplay); Dustin Hoffman, Isabelle Huppert, Jude Law, Jason Schwartzman, Lily Tomlin, Mark Wahlberg, Naomi Watts, Ger Duany, Isla Fisher, Sydney Zarp, Jonah Hill, Richard Jenkins, Darlene Hunt, Kevin Dunn, Benny Hernandez, Richard Appel, Benjamin Nurick, Jake Muxworthy, Tippi Hedren, Altagracia Guzman, Said Taghmaoui, Bob Gunton, Talia Shire, Jean Smart, Shania Twain	
O C T O B E R	1	Ladder 49	Touchstone Pictures / Beacon Pictures / Casey Silver Productions	Jay Russell (director); Lewis Colick (screenplay); Joaquin Phoenix, John Travolta, Jacinda Barrett, Morris Chestnut, Robert Patrick, Balthazar Getty, Billy Burke, Tim Guinee, Kevin Chapman, Jay Hernandez, Kevin Daniels, Steve Maye, Robert Logan Lewis, Spencer Berglund, Brooke Hamlin, Sam Stockdale, Paul Novak Jr., Martin O'Malley	
O C T O B E R	1	Shark Tale	DreamWorks Animation	Rob Letterman (director/screenplay); Bibo Bergeron, Vicky Jenson (directors); Michael J. Wilson (screenplay); Will Smith, Jack Black, Robert De Niro, Renée Zellweger, Angelina Jolie, Martin Scorsese, Ziggy Marley, Doug E. Doug, Michael Imperioli, Vincent Pastore, Peter Falk, Katie Couric, David Soren, Bobb'e J. Thompson, Phil LaMarr, Jenifer Lewis, David P. Smith	
O C T O B E R	4	Bride and Prejudice	Miramax Films	Gurinder Chadha (director/screenplay); Paul Mayeda Berges (screenplay); Aishwarya Rai, Martin Henderson, Nadira Babbar, Anupam Kher, Naveen Andrews, Namrata Shirodkar, Sonali Kulkarni	
O C T O B E R	6	Taxi	20th Century Fox	Tim Story (director); Robert Ben Garant, Thomas Lennon, Jim Kouf (screenplay); Queen Latifah, Jimmy Fallon, Gisele Bündchen, Jennifer Esposito, Henry Simmons, Ann-Margret, Ana Cristina de Oliveira, Ingrid Vandebosch, Magali Amadei, Christian Kane, Boris McGiver, Adrian Martinez, Joe Lisi, GQ, Bryna Weiss, Jeff Gordon	
O C T O B E R	8	Around the Bend	Warner Independent Pictures	Jordan Roberts (director/screenplay); Christopher Walken, Josh Lucas, Michael Caine, Glenne Headly, Jonah Bobo	
O C T O B E R	8	Friday Night Lights	Universal Pictures / Imagine Entertainment	Peter Berg (director/screenplay); David Aaron Cohen (screenplay); Billy Bob Thornton, Derek Luke, Jay Hernandez, Lucas Black, Garrett Hedlund, Tim McGraw, Lee Thompson Young, Connie Britton, Amber Heard, Julius Tennon, Connie Cooper, Stephen Bishop, Christian Kane, Brad Leland, Roy Williams, Aqib Talib, Ty Law, Boobie Miles	
O C T O B E R	8	Raise Your Voice	New Line Cinema / FilmEngine	Sean McNamara (director); Sam Schreiber (screenplay); Hilary Duff, Oliver James, Jason Ritter, Dana Davis, Kat Dennings, Rita Wilson, David Keith, Rebecca De Mornay, John Corbett, Lauren C. Mayhew, Johnny Lewis, Davida Williams, Fred Meyers, James Avery, Robert Trebor, Gibby Brand, Three Days Grace	
O C T O B E R	15	Being Julia	Sony Pictures Classics	István Szabó (director); Ronald Harwood (screenplay); Annette Bening, Jeremy Irons, Shaun Evans, Lucy Punch, Juliet Stevenson, Miriam Margoyles, Tom Sturridge, Bruce Greenwood, Rosemary Harris, Rita Tushingham, Michael Gambon	
O C T O B E R	15	The Final Cut	Lions Gate Films	Omar Naim (director/screenplay); Robin Williams, Mira Sorvino, Jim Caviezel, Mimi Kuzyk, Stephanie Romanov, Genevieve Buechner, Brendan Fletcher, Joely Collins, Christopher Britton, Thom Bishops, Michael St. John Smith	
O C T O B E R	15	Shall We Dance?	Miramax Films	Peter Chelsom (director); Audrey Wells (screenplay); Richard Gere, Jennifer Lopez, Susan Sarandon, Stanley Tucci, Lisa Ann Walter, Richard Jenkins, Bobby Cannavale, Omar Benson Miller, Mýa Harrison, Ja Rule, Nick Cannon, Anita Gillette, Tamara Hope, Stark Sands, Karina Smirnoff, Tony Dovolani, Cesar Corrales, Slavik Kryklyvyy	
O C T O B E R	15	Team America: World Police	Paramount Pictures	Trey Parker (director/screenplay); Matt Stone, Pam Brady (screenplay); Trey Parker, Matt Stone, Kristen Miller, Masasa, Daran Norris, Phil Hendrie, Maurice LaMarche, Jeremy Shada, Fred Tatasciore, Scott Land, Chelsea Marguerite, Tony Urbano, Greg Ballora, Adrian Connon McDonald	
O C T O B E R	22	The Grudge	Columbia Pictures / Ghost House Pictures	Takashi Shimizu (director); Stephen Susco (screenplay); Sarah Michelle Gellar, Jason Behr, KaDee Strickland, Grace Zabriskie, Rosa Blasi, Clea DuVall, Bill Pullman, William Mapother, Ted Raimi, Ryo Ishibashi, Yōko Maki, Takako Fuji, Yuya Ozeki, Takashi Matsuyama	
O C T O B E R	22	Sideways	Fox Searchlight Pictures	Alexander Payne (director/screenplay); Jim Taylor (screenplay); Paul Giamatti, Thomas Haden Church, Virginia Madsen, Sandra Oh, Marylouise Burke, Jessica Hecht, Missy Doty, M. C. Gainey, Alysia Reiner, Shake Tukhmanyan, Shaun Duke, Stephanie Faracy, Joe Marinelli	
O C T O B E R	22	Surviving Christmas	DreamWorks Pictures	Mike Mitchell (director); Deborah Kaplan, Harry Elfont, Jeffrey Ventimilia, Joshua Sternin (screenplay); Ben Affleck, James Gandolfini, Christina Applegate, Catherine O'Hara, Josh Zuckerman, Bill Macy, Jennifer Morrison, Udo Kier, David Selby, Stephanie Faracy, Stephen Root, Sy Richardson, Tangie Ambrose, Peter Jason, Phill Lewis, Sean Marquette, Sonya Eddy, Tom Kenny, Ray Buffer, Hailey Noelle Johnson	
O C T O B E R	22	Vera Drake	Fine Line Features	Mike Leigh (director/screenplay); Imelda Staunton, Richard Graham, Eddie Marsan, Anna Keaveney, Sally Hawkins, Alex Kelly, Daniel Mays, Phil Davis, Sandra Voe, Adrian Scarborough, Heather Craney, Ruth Sheen, Lesley Sharp, Liz White, Peter Wight, Martin Savage, Jim Broadbent, Simon Chandler, Lesley Manville, Marion Bailey	
O C T O B E R	29	Birth	New Line Cinema	Jonathan Glazer (director/screenplay); Jean-Claude Carrière, Milo Addica (screenplay); Nicole Kidman, Cameron Bright, Danny Huston, Lauren Bacall, Alison Elliott, Arliss Howard, Anne Heche, Peter Stormare, Ted Levine, Cara Seymour, Novella Nelson, Zoe Caldwell, Libby Skala, Michael Desautels, Joe M. Chalmers, Charles Goff, Sheila Smith, Milo Addica, Michael Joseph Cortese Jr., John Robert Tramutola, Jordan Lage	
O C T O B E R	29	Ray	Universal Pictures / Bristol Bay Productions	Taylor Hackford (director); James L. White (screenplay); Jamie Foxx, Kerry Washington, Clifton Powell, Aunjanue Ellis, Harry Lennix, Terrence Howard, Larenz Tate, Richard Schiff, Regina King, Bokeem Woodbine, Sharon Warren, Curtis Armstrong, Wendell Pierce, Chris Thomas King, David Krumholtz, Kurt Fuller, Warwick Davis, Patrick Bauchau, Robert Ray Wisdom, Denise Dowse	
O C T O B E R	29	Saw	Lions Gate Films / Twisted Pictures	James Wan (director/screenplay); Leigh Whannell (screenplay); Cary Elwes, Danny Glover, Monica Potter, Michael Emerson, Ken Leung, Tobin Bell, Dina Meyer, Shawnee Smith, Leigh Whannell, Mike Butters, Paul Gutrecht, Makenzie Vega, Ned Bellamy, Alexandra Bokyun Chun, Oren Koules, Benito Martinez	
O C T O B E R	29	Stage Beauty	Lions Gate Films	Richard Eyre (director); Jeffrey Hatcher (screenplay); Billy Crudup, Claire Danes, Rupert Everett, Zoë Tapper, Tom Wilkinson, Richard Griffiths, Hugh Bonneville, Ben Chaplin, Edward Fox, Alice Eve, Stephen Marcus, Tom Hollander	
N O V E M B E	5	Alfie	Paramount Pictures	Charles Shyer (director/screenplay); Elaine Pope (screenplay); Jude Law, Marisa Tomei, Omar Epps, Nia Long, Jane Krakowski, Sienna Miller, Susan Sarandon, Renée Taylor, Jeff Harding, Kevin Rahm, Max Morris, Tara Summers, Jefferson Mays, Dick Latessa, Gedde Watanabe, Katherine LaNasa, Claudette Mink, Anastasia Griffith, Sondra James, Graydon Carter, Finlay Robertson, Edward Hogg, Stephen Gaghan, Paul Brooke, Terry Edwards	
N O V E M B E	5	Fade to Black	Paramount Classics / @radical.media	Patrick Paulson, Michael John Warren (directors); Jay-Z, Beyoncé Knowles, Mary J. Blige, Foxy Brown, Diddy, Damon Dash, Missy Elliott, R. Kelly, Usher, Fonzworth Bentley, Memphis Bleek, Michael Buffer, Common, Freeway, Funkmaster Flex, Ghostface Killah, Mike D, Q-Tip, Questlove, Slick Rick, Rick Rubin, Afeni Shakur, Beanie Sigel, Timbaland, Twista, Voletta Wallace, Kanye West, Pharrell Williams, Jaguar Wright	
N O V E M B E	5	The Incredibles	Walt Disney Pictures / Pixar Animation Studios	Brad Bird (director/screenplay); Craig T. Nelson, Holly Hunter, Samuel L. Jackson, Jason Lee, Elizabeth Peña, Sarah Vowell, Spencer Fox, Brad Bird, Wallace Shawn, Bud Luckey, Teddy Newton, Jean Sincere, Lou Romano, John Ratzenberger, Mark Andrews, Ollie Johnston, A. J. Riebli, Nicholas Bird, Brad Lewis, Stephen Schaffer, Pete Docter, Peter Sohn, Bob Peterson, Andrew Stanton, Jeff Pidgeon, Frank Thomas, Pamela Gaye Walker, Joe Ranft, Michael Bird, Dominique Lewis, Bret Parker, Kimberly Adair Clark, Eli Fucile, Maeve Andrews	
N O V E M B E	9	Mickey's Twice Upon a Christmas	Walt Disney Home Entertainment / Disneytoon Studios	Matthew O'Callaghan (director/screenplay); Bill Motz, Bob Roth, Peggy Holmes, Chad Fiveash, James Patrick Stoteraux, Shirley Pierce, Jim Peronto, Carole Holliday, Michael Shipley, Jim Bernstein (screenplay); Wayne Allwine, Tony Anselmo, Bill Farmer, Russi Taylor, Tress MacNeille, Alan Young, Jason Marsden, Kellie Martin, Chuck McCann, Jeff Bennett, Jim Cummings, Clive Revill, Edie McClurg, Rob Paulsen	
N O V E M B E	10	The Polar Express	Warner Bros. Pictures / Castle Rock Entertainment / Shangri-La Entertainment / ImageMovers / Playtone	Robert Zemeckis (director/screenplay); William Broyles Jr. (screenplay); Tom Hanks, Daryl Sabara, Josh Hutcherson, Michael Jeter, André Sogliuzzo, Eddie Deezen, Jimmy 'Jax' Pinchak, Nona Gaye, Tinashe, Peter Scolari, Jimmy Bennett, Matthew Hall, Chris Coppola, Phil Fondacaro, Debbie Lee Carrington, Ed Gale, Mark Povinelli, Charles Fleischer, Steven Tyler, Jon Scott, Mark Goodman, Dylan Cash, Connor Matheus, Julene Renee, Brendan King, Andy Pellick, Josh Eli, Rolandas Hendricks, Sean Scott, Mark Mendonca, Gregory Gast, Gordon Hart, Leslie Zemeckis, Isabella Peregrina, Ashly Holloway, Chantel Valdivieso, Meagan Moore, Hayden McFarland	
N O V E M B E	12	After the Sunset	New Line Cinema	Brett Ratner (director); Paul Zbyszewski, Craig Rosenberg (screenplay); Pierce Brosnan, Salma Hayek, Woody Harrelson, Don Cheadle, Naomie Harris, Rex Linn, Mykelti Williamson, Troy Garity, Obba Babatundé, Michael Bowen, Russell Hornsby, Mark Moses, Chris Penn, Joel McKinnon Miller, Alan Dale, Noémie Lenoir, John Michael Higgins, Gary Payton, Karl Malone, Phil Jackson, Jeff Garlin, Dyan Cannon, Edward Norton, Shaquille O'Neal	
N O V E M B E	12	Finding Neverland	Miramax Films	Marc Forster (director); David Magee (screenplay); Johnny Depp, Kate Winslet, Julie Christie, Radha Mitchell, Dustin Hoffman, Freddie Highmore, Nick Roud, Joe Prospero, Luke Spill, Ian Hart, Oliver Fox, Mackenzie Crook, Kelly Macdonald, Angus Barnett, Toby Jones, Kate Maberly, Matt Green, Catrin Rhys, Tim Potter, Jane Booker, Eileen Essell, Jimmy Gardner, Paul Whitehouse, Murray McArthur	
N O V E M B E	12	Kinsey	Fox Searchlight Pictures	Bill Condon (director/screenplay); Liam Neeson, Laura Linney, Chris O'Donnell, Peter Sarsgaard, Timothy Hutton, John Lithgow, Tim Curry, Oliver Platt, Dylan Baker, William Sadler, John McMartin, John Krasinski, Lynn Redgrave, Julianne Nicholson, Veronica Cartwright, Kathleen Chalfant, Heather Goldenhersh, David Harbour, Luke Macfarlane, Benjamin Walker, Will Denton, Judith J.K. Polson, Leigh Spofford, Jenna Gavigan, Bill Buell, Matthew Fahey	
N O V E M B E	12	Seed of Chucky	Rogue Pictures	Don Mancini (director/screenplay); Brad Dourif, Jennifer Tilly, Billy Boyd, Redman, Hannah Spearritt, Steve Lawton, John Waters, Jason Flemyng, Tony Gardner, Keith-Lee Castle, Rebecca Santos, Betty Simons-Denville, Simon James Morgan, Stephanie Chambers, Paul Grossman, Nadia Dina Ariqat, Beans El-Balawi, Kristina Hewitt	
N O V E M B E	16	Kangaroo Jack: G'Day U.S.A.!	Warner Home Video / Warner Bros. Animation / Castle Rock Entertainment	Emory Myrick, Jeffrey Gatrall (directors); Adam Scheinman, Andrew Scheinman (screenplay); Jeff Bennett, Josh Keaton, Keith Diamond, Phil LaMarr, Kath Soucie, Ahmed Best, Jim Ward, Obba Babatundé, Dorian Harewood, Carlos Alazraqui, Jess Harnell, Jeannie Elias, Wendee Lee, Steve Miller	
N O V E M B E	19	Bridget Jones: The Edge of Reason	Universal Pictures / StudioCanal / Miramax Films / Working Title Films	Beeban Kidron (director); Andrew Davies, Helen Fielding, Richard Curtis, Adam Brooks (screenplay); Renée Zellweger, Hugh Grant, Colin Firth, Jim Broadbent, Gemma Jones, Celia Imrie, James Faulkner, Jacinda Barrett, Sally Phillips, Shirley Henderson, James Callis, Neil Pearson, Donald Douglas, Shirley Dixon, David Verrey, Jeremy Paxman, Ian McNeice, Jessica Stevenson, Paul Nicholls, Wolf Kahler, Catherine Russell, Ting-Ting Hu, Jason Watkins, Vee Vimolmal, Neil Dudgeon, Pui Fan Lee, Melissa Ashworth	
N O V E M B E	19	National Treasure	Walt Disney Pictures / Jerry Bruckheimer Films	Jon Turteltaub (director); Jim Kouf, Cormac Wibberley, Marianne Wibberley (screenplay); Nicolas Cage, Jon Voight, Sean Bean, Diane Kruger, Justin Bartha, Harvey Keitel, Christopher Plummer, Jack Koenig, David Dayan Fisher, Stewart Finlay-McLennan, Oleg Taktarov, Stephen Pope, Annie Parisse, Mark Pellegrino, Armando Riesco, Erik King, Hunter Gomez, Jason Earles	
N O V E M B E	19	The SpongeBob SquarePants Movie	Paramount Pictures / Nickelodeon Movies / United Plankton Pictures	Stephen Hillenburg (director/screenplay); Derek Drymon, Tim Hill, Kent Osborne, Aaron Springer, Paul Tibbitt (screenplay); Tom Kenny, Bill Fagerbakke, Clancy Brown, Rodger Bumpass, Mr. Lawrence, Jill Talley, Carolyn Lawrence, Mary Jo Catlett, Jeffrey Tambor, Scarlett Johansson, Alec Baldwin, David Hasselhoff, Henry Kingi, Mageina Tovah, Todd Duffey, Dee Bradley Baker, Sirena Irwin, Lori Alan, Tom Wilson, Carlos Alazraqui, Joshua Seth, Tim Blaney, Derek Drymon, Aaron Springer, Neil Ross, Stephen Hillenburg, Michael Patrick Bell, Jim Wise, Bart McCarthy	
N O V E M B E	24	Alexander	Warner Bros. Pictures / Intermedia Films	Oliver Stone (director/screenplay); Christopher Kyle, Laeta Kalogridis (screenplay); Colin Farrell, Angelina Jolie, Val Kilmer, Christopher Plummer, Jared Leto, Rosario Dawson, Anthony Hopkins, Jonathan Rhys Meyers, Brian Blessed, Tim Pigott-Smith, Toby Kebbell, Connor Paolo, David Bedella, Fiona O'Shaughnessy, Gary Stretch, John Kavanagh, Nick Dunning, Marie Meyer, Mick Lally, Joseph Morgan, Ian Beattie, Denis Conway, Neil Jackson, Garrett Lombard, Chris Aberdein, Rory McCann, Raz Degan, Erol Sander, Stéphane Ferrara, Tadhg Murphy, Francisco Bosch, Annelise Hesme, Laird Macintosh, Feodor Atkine, Bin Bunluerit, Jaran Ngramdee, Brian McGrath, Elliot Cowan, Oliver Stone	
N O V E M B E	24	Christmas with the Kranks	Columbia Pictures / Revolution Studios / 1492 Pictures	Joe Roth (director); Chris Columbus (screenplay); Tim Allen, Jamie Lee Curtis, Dan Aykroyd, Erik Per Sullivan, Cheech Marin, Jake Busey, M. Emmet Walsh, Julie Gonzalo, Dava Hulsey, Elizabeth Franz, Austin Pendleton, Tom Poston, Kim Rhodes, Vernee Watson-Johnson, Arden Myrin, Rene Lavan, Patrick Breen, Caroline Rhea, Felicity Huffman, Kevin Chamberlin	
N O V E M B E	26	A Very Long Engagement	Warner Independent Pictures	Jean-Pierre Jeunet (director/screenplay); Guillaume Laurant (screenplay); Audrey Tautou, Gaspard Ulliel, Marion Cotillard, Dominique Pinon, Chantal Neuwirth, André Dussolier, Ticky Holgado, Jodie Foster, Clovis Cornillac, Jean-Pierre Darroussin, Julie Depardieu, Jean-Claude Dreyfus, Tchéky Karyo, Jérôme Kircher, Denis Lavant, Urbain Cancelier, Jean-Paul Rouve, Michel Vuillermoz, Albert Dupontel, Bouli Lanners, Philippe Duquesne, François Levantal, Rufus, Frédérique Bel, Elina Löwensohn, Michel Robin, Jean-Pierre Becker, Dominique Bettenfeld, Stéphane Butet, Thierry Gibault	
D E C E M B E R	3	Closer	Columbia Pictures	Mike Nichols (director); Patrick Marber (screenplay); Julia Roberts, Jude Law, Natalie Portman, Clive Owen	
D E C E M B E R	3	House of Flying Daggers	Sony Pictures Classics	Zhang Yimou (director/screenplay); Li Feng, Peter Wu, Wang Bin (screenplay); Andy Lau, Zhang Ziyi, Takeshi Kaneshiro	
D E C E M B E R	5	Blue Collar Comedy Tour Rides Again	Paramount Pictures	C. B. Harding (director); Jeff Foxworthy, Bill Engvall, Larry the Cable Guy, Ron White	
D E C E M B E R	5	The Life and Death of Peter Sellers	HBO Films / BBC Films	Stephen Hopkins (director); Christopher Markus, Stephen McFeely (screenplay); Geoffrey Rush, Charlize Theron, John Lithgow, Stanley Tucci, Emily Watson, Miriam Margoyles, Peter Vaughan, Sonia Aquino, Stephen Fry, Henry Goodman, Alison Steadman, Emilia Fox, Nigel Havers, Heidi Klum, Lucy Punch, Joseph Long, Edward Tudor-Pole, Steve Pemberton, Mackenzie Crook, Richard Ayoade, Lance Ellington, Sam Dastor, Tom Wu, Mona Hammond	
D E C E M B E R	8	Blade: Trinity	New Line Cinema / Marvel Enterprises	David S. Goyer (director/screenplay); Wesley Snipes, Jessica Biel, Ryan Reynolds, Kris Kristofferson, Parker Posey, Natasha Lyonne, Dominic Purcell, Triple H, Callum Keith Rennie, John Michael Higgins, Patton Oswalt, James Remar, Christopher Heyerdahl, Eric Bogosian, Françoise Yip, Kett Turton, Paul Anthony, Haili Page, Mark Berry, Michael Anthony Rawlins, Scott Heindl, Cascy Beddow, John Ashker, Ron Selmour	
D E C E M B E R	10	Ocean's Twelve	Warner Bros. Pictures / Village Roadshow Pictures / Jerry Weintraub Productions	Steven Soderbergh (director); George Nolfi (screenplay); George Clooney, Brad Pitt, Matt Damon, Catherine Zeta-Jones, Andy García, Don Cheadle, Bernie Mac, Julia Roberts, Elliott Gould, Casey Affleck, Scott Caan, Eddie Jemison, Shaobo Qin, Carl Reiner, Vincent Cassel, Albert Finney, Eddie Izzard, Bruce Willis, Jeroen Krabbe, Cherry Jones, Robbie Coltrane, Topher Grace, Candice Azzara, Jerry Weintraub, Jared Harris, Mini Andén, Johan Widerberg, Jeroen Willems, Michael DeLano, Al Faris, Anne-Solenne Hatte, Martina Stella, Mattia Sbragia, Adriano Giannini, Scott L. Schwartz, Giselda Volodi, Arsenal F.C.	
D E C E M B E R	15	Million Dollar Baby	Warner Bros. Pictures / Lakeshore Entertainment	Clint Eastwood (director);Paul Haggis (screenplay); Clint Eastwood, Hilary Swank, Morgan Freeman, Jay Baruchel, Mike Colter, Lucia Rijker, Brían F. O'Byrne, Anthony Mackie, Margo Martindale, Riki Lindhome, Michael Pena, Benito Martinez, Grant L. Roberts, Bruce MacVittie, Aaron Stretch	
D E C E M B E R	17	Beyond the Sea	Lions Gate Films	Kevin Spacey (director/screenplay); Lewis Colick (screenplay); Kevin Spacey, Kate Bosworth, Bob Hoskins, John Goodman, Brenda Blethyn, Caroline Aaron, Greta Scacchi, Peter Cincotti, Matt Rippy	
D E C E M B E R	17	Flight of the Phoenix	20th Century Fox / Davis Entertainment	John Moore (director); Scott Frank, Edward Burns (screenplay); Dennis Quaid, Giovanni Ribisi, Tyrese Gibson, Miranda Otto, Hugh Laurie, Tony Curran, Scott Michael Campbell, Sticky Fingaz, Jacob Vargas, Kevork Malikyan, Jared Padalecki, Anthony Wong, Paul Ditchfield, Martin Hindy, Bob Brown	
D E C E M B E R	17	Lemony Snicket's A Series of Unfortunate Events	Paramount Pictures / DreamWorks Pictures / Nickelodeon Movies	Brad Silberling (director); Robert Gordon (screenplay); Jim Carrey, Jude Law, Liam Aiken, Emily Browning, Timothy Spall, Catherine O'Hara, Billy Connolly, Cedric the Entertainer, Luis Guzmán, Jennifer Coolidge, Meryl Streep, Craig Ferguson, Jamie Harris, Jane Adams, Jane Lynch, Helena Bonham Carter, Dustin Hoffman, Daniel Handler, Bob Clendenin, Lenny Clarke, Deborah Theaker, Amy Brenneman, Gilbert Gottfried, Rick Heinrichs, Kara and Shelby Hoffman	
D E C E M B E R	17	Spanglish	Columbia Pictures	James L. Brooks (director/screenplay); Adam Sandler, Téa Leoni, Paz Vega, Cloris Leachman, Aimee Garcia, Sarah Steele, Cecilia Suárez, Thomas Haden Church, Antonio Muñoz, Shelbie Bruce, Ian Hyland, Jake Pennington	
D E C E M B E R	22	Hotel Rwanda	United Artists	Terry George (director/screenplay); Keir Pearson (screenplay); Don Cheadle, Sophie Okonedo, Joaquin Phoenix, Nick Nolte, Fana Mokoena, Cara Seymour, Tony Kgoroge, Desmond Dube, Hakeem Kae-Kazim, Leleti Khumalo, Jean Reno, Antonio Lyons, Mosa Kaiser, Mduduzi Mabaso	
D E C E M B E R	22	Meet the Fockers	Universal Pictures / DreamWorks Pictures	Jay Roach (director); Jim Herzfeld, John Hamburg (screenplay); Ben Stiller, Robert De Niro, Dustin Hoffman, Barbra Streisand, Blythe Danner, Teri Polo, Alanna Ubach, Ray Santiago, Tim Blake Nelson, Shelley Berman, Kali Rocha, Owen Wilson, Cedric Yarbrough, Spencer and Bradley Pickren	
D E C E M B E R	25	The Aviator	Miramax Films / Warner Bros. Pictures	Martin Scorsese (director); John Logan (screenplay); Leonardo DiCaprio, Cate Blanchett, Kate Beckinsale, John C. Reilly, Alec Baldwin, Alan Alda, Ian Holm, Danny Huston, Gwen Stefani, Jude Law, Willem Dafoe, Adam Scott, Matt Ross, Kevin O'Rourke, Kelli Garner, Frances Conroy, Brent Spiner, Stanley DeSantis, Edward Herrmann, J. C. MacKenzie, Josie Maran, Kenneth Welsh, Rufus Wainwright	
D E C E M B E R	25	Darkness	Dimension Films	Jaume Balagueró (director/screenplay); Fernando de Felipe (screenplay); Anna Paquin, Lena Olin, Iain Glen, Giancarlo Giannini, Fele Martínez, Fermin Reixach, Stephan Enquist	
D E C E M B E R	25	Fat Albert	20th Century Fox / Davis Entertainment	Joel Zwick (director); Bill Cosby, Charles Kipps (screenplay); Kenan Thompson, Kyla Pratt, Marques Houston, Omarion Grandberry, Dania Ramirez, Shedrack Anderson III, Keith Robinson, Jermaine Williams, Aaron Frazier, Alphonso McAuley, J. Mack Slaughter Jr., Alice Greczyn, Rick Overton, Keri Lynn Pratt, Dylan Cash, Bill Cosby, Aaron Carter, Fonzworth Bentley, Jeff Garlin, Joel Madden, Mase, Nick Zano, Denise Richards, Jeremy Suarez, Earl Billings, Raven-Symoné, Catero Colbert, Charles Duckworth, Ben Diskin, Josh Uhler, Bill Ratner	
D E C E M B E R	25	The Life Aquatic with Steve Zissou	Touchstone Pictures	Wes Anderson (director/screenplay); Noah Baumbach (screenplay); Bill Murray, Owen Wilson, Cate Blanchett, Anjelica Huston, Willem Dafoe, Jeff Goldblum, Michael Gambon, Bud Cort, Noah Taylor, Seu Jorge, Robyn Cohen, Waris Ahluwalia, Matthew Gray Gubler, Antonio Monda, Isabella Blow, Seymour Cassel, Niels Koizumi, Pawel Wdowczak	
D E C E M B E R	29	The Assassination of Richard Nixon	ThinkFilm	Niels Mueller (director/screenplay); Kevin Kennedy (screenplay); Sean Penn, Don Cheadle, Jack Thompson, Naomi Watts, Mykelti Williamson, Michael Wincott, Nick Searcy, Brad William Henke, Joe Marinelli, April Grace, Eileen Ryan, Tracy Middendorf, J. C. MacKenzie, Russell Means, Richard Nixon, Mohammed Reza Pahlavi, Augusto Pinochet	
D E C E M B E R	29	In Good Company	Universal Pictures	Paul Weitz (director/screenplay); Dennis Quaid, Scarlett Johansson, Topher Grace, Marg Helgenberger, David Paymer, Clark Gregg, Selma Blair, Ty Burrell, Frankie Faison, Philip Baker Hall, Amy Aquino, Lauren Tom, Colleen Camp, John Cho, Malcolm McDowell, Zena Grey	

== See also ==
- List of 2004 box office number-one films in the United States
- 2004 in the United States
