= Snow Dogs =

2002 film by Brian Levant

- Theatrical release poster
- Directed by: Brian Levant
- Written by: Jim Kouf; Tommy Swerdlow; Michael Goldberg; Mark Gibson; Philip Halprin
- Based on: Winterdance by Gary Paulsen
- Produced by: Jordan Kerner
- Starring: Cuba Gooding Jr. James Coburn; Sisqó; Nichelle Nichols; Graham Greene
- Cinematography: Thomas E. Ackerman
- Edited by: Roger Bondelli
- Music by: John Debney
- Production companies: Walt Disney Pictures; The Kerner Entertainment Company; Galapagos Productions
- Distributed by: Buena Vista Pictures Distribution
- Release date: January 18, 2002
- Running time: 99 minutes
- Country: United States
- Language: English
- Budget: $33 million
- Box office: $115 million

Snow Dogs is a 2002 American comedy film directed by Brian Levant, and produced by Jordan Kerner. The film stars Cuba Gooding Jr., with a supporting cast of James Coburn, Joanna Bacalso, Sisqó, Nichelle Nichols, Christopher Judge, Michael Bolton and M. Emmet Walsh. The film was released in the United States on January 18, 2002. The film is inspired by the book Winterdance, by Gary Paulsen.

== Plot ==
Dr. Theodore "Ted" Brooks is a celebrity dentist working in Miami, Florida, running his "Hot Smile" dental practice with his cousin and fellow dentist Rupert, and every city bus carries an advertisement for "Hot Smile" with Ted's picture. One day, Ted receives a letter from Alaska, naming him as the only heir of Lucy Watkins, a resident of the backwoods village of Tolketna. Hearing this, Ted's mother Amelia reveals she adopted him, and Lucy was his biological mother.

Ted travels to Tolketna to claim his inheritance from Lucy: seven Siberian Huskies named Diesel, Mack, Sniff, Yodel, Scooper, Duchess and Demon, and a Border Collie named Nana. Completely out of his element, Ted is confounded by blizzards, thin ice, foxes, skunks, grizzly bears, an intimidating, crusty old mountain man named James "Thunder Jack" Johnson, and the aggressive, defiant lead dog, Demon. All of this happens among the buzzing excitement of the Arctic Challenge Sled Dog Race, which is only two weeks away.

While in Tolketna, Ted tries to find out why he was placed for adoption, and who was his biological father. He meets bar owner Barb, Lucy's close friend and former boss, who helps Ted to deal with the dogs, teaches him how to drive a sled, and the two fall in love. Ted also has several encounters with Thunder Jack, who tries to buy the dogs, especially Demon. Barb reveals to Ted that Thunder Jack is his biological father; Ted confronts Jack, who initially denies the claims.

After Ted loses consciousness while practicing sledding and being chased by a bear, Jack rescues him and takes him to a cave, where he offers to reveal the truth in exchange for the dogs. After Ted agrees, Jack claims that he and Lucy hid from a storm in the same cave during an Arctic Challenge years earlier, and it was then Ted was conceived. Jack also says Lucy was gone when he woke up; he looked for her but never found her.

Ted lets Jack have the dogs and returns to Miami. Jack adds Demon as lead dog of his team for the Arctic Challenge. When the race begins, Jack decides to press on in the middle of a fierce storm.

In Miami, Ted recounts his experiences to his mother, who accidentally breaks the frame holding a picture of Lucy and Demon. Inside of the frame is a snapshot of Lucy and Jack with a baby. Realizing that Jack lied to him, an infuriated Ted rushes back to Alaska, where he learns that Jack has gone missing and the weather is too bad for searching. Ted decides to search for Jack himself, taking Lucy's dogs with Nana as lead. A few hours later, Amelia arrives and meets Barb, who tells her that Ted is out on the trail, searching for Jack. The "Arctic Flame" is left burning over the finish line until the last musher arrives.

Ted eventually locates Jack in the old cave, where Jack admits he and Lucy had been together at the hospital when Ted was born, and that he loved her very much, but that he and Lucy had agreed then that neither of them were ready to be parents. The next morning, Ted discovers that Demon's bad temper is due to a rotten tooth; he pulls the tooth, and Demon becomes a much friendlier dog. During the journey back to Tolketna, the sled nearly goes over a cliff into a river, but the dogs pull themselves back up. Ted finally brings Thunder Jack across the finish line, introduces him to Amelia, and the father and son decide to share the "Arctic Flame" trophy, which is given to whoever comes in last.

Some time later, Ted marries Barb, and moves his dental practice to Tolketna. Barb, now pregnant, is his receptionist, while Nana and Demon have four puppies named Avalanche, Aleutia, Chinook and Demon Jr. Meanwhile, back in Miami, Rupert becomes the new celebrity dentist, with his own face on every city bus.

== Cast ==
- Cuba Gooding Jr. as Theodore "Ted" Brooks, a Miami dentist who goes to Alaska to find his origins and encounters a pack of sled dogs
  - Jascha Washington as Young Ted
- James Coburn as James "Thunder Jack" Johnson, a mountain man and Ted's biological father
- Joanna Bacalso as Barb, a local Tolketna bar owner, and Ted's love interest, who becomes a receptionist for Ted's new dental office in the end of the film
- Nichelle Nichols as Amelia Brooks, Ted's adoptive mother
- Sisqó as Dr. Rupert Brooks, Ted's adopted cousin
- M. Emmet Walsh as George Murphy
- Graham Greene as Peter Yellowbear
- Brian Doyle-Murray as Ernie
- Michael Bolton as himself, who appears in Ted's dream giving him advice that he still has soul
- Christopher Judge as Dr. Brooks, Ted's adoptive father
- Angela Moore as Lucy Watkins, Ted's biological mother
- Frank C. Turner as Neely
- Jean-Michel Paré as Olivier, the aloof French reigning champion of the Arctic Challenge (credited as Jean-Michel Pare)
- Alison Matthews as TV Reporter
- Danelle Folta as Rollerblader with Dog
- Lossen Chambers as Receptionist
- Jim Belushi as the voice of Demon
- Jane Sibbett as the voice of Nana
- Frank Welker as the voice of Grizzly Bear, who encounters Ted and chases him through the mountain.
- Richard Steven Horvitz as the voice of Scooper

In some scenes, the faces of the dogs are partially animated to give them human expressions like winking or smiling. The animatronic version of Demon was created by Jim Henson's Creature Shop and performed by David Barclay.

== Production ==
Filming took place from January 29, 2001, to April 23, 2001. The film's budget was US$33 million. Canmore, Alberta, Canada, was used to film the fictional city of Tolketna, Alaska (actually known as Talkeetna, Alaska.) The dogs D.J., Koda, Floyd and Buck also starred in the later Disney live-action adventure film, Eight Below. Many of the dogs and mushers used in the film were locals. Two of the hero team doubles and all of Olivier's team were supplied by Nakitsilik Siberians of Bridge Lake, British Columbia. Mountain Mushers' from Golden BC supplied the Thunder Jack team.

Old Ernie's team was supplied by Russ Gregory from Calgary, Alberta, Canada. Arcticsun Siberian Husky Kennel from Edmonton, Alberta was one of many kennels — including Czyz, Snowy Owl, Gatt racing — from the area that supplied background for the film. Two of the dogs came from Kortar Kennels, in Ontario. The animatronic effects were designed and built by Jim Henson's Creature Shop.

The special effects were provided by The Secret Lab, the special effects division of Disney.

== Reception ==
On Rotten Tomatoes, Snow Dogs has an approval rating of 26% and an average rating of 4.1/10 based on 85 reviews. The site's consensus reads "A mediocre live action children's movie, Snow Dogs is filled with clichéd dialogue, tiresome pratfalls, and stale fish-out-of-water jokes." At Metacritic, which uses a weighted average, the film received a score of 29 out of 100 based on 26 critics, indicating "generally unfavorable reviews". Audiences polled by CinemaScore gave the film an average grade of "A-" on an A+ to F scale.

It grossed $115 million worldwide against a $33 million budget. The film was released on VHS and DVD on May 14, 2002. The film was filmed in 1.85:1 widescreen. All copies present the film in 1.33:1 fullscreen.

== Awards ==
John Debney won the ASCAP Award in 2003, for the soundtrack.

== See also ==
- Eight Below
- Snow Buddies
- Nankyoku Monogatari
