= Winterdance =

Book by Gary Paulsen

- Author: Gary Paulsen
- Cover artist: Gary Paulsen
- Language: English
- Subject: Dogsled racing Iditarod Trail Sled Dog Race
- Genre: Nonfiction
- Publisher: Harcourt Trade Publishers
- Publication date: March 1, 1994
- Publication place: The United States of America
- Media type: Print (Hardback & Paperback)
- Pages: 272 pp (first edition)
- ISBN: 978-0-15-126227-4
- OCLC: 29429380
- Dewey Decimal: 798.8/092 B 20
- LC Class: SF440.15 .P38 1994

Winterdance: The Fine Madness of Running the Iditarod is a nonfiction book written by American author Gary Paulsen, published on March 1, 1994, by Houghton Mifflin Harcourt. It was also published in 1995 under the name Winterdance: The Fine Madness of Alaskan Dog-Racing.

Winterdance is the inspiration for the 2002 Disney movie Snow Dogs.

== Plot ==
The story begins with a poverty stricken Gary Paulsen (and his wife Ruth Wright Paulsen) living in a cabin in the woods of Minnesota, where he uses a team of dogs to pull a sled as he checks his trap lines. As Gary Paulsen's relationship with the dogs grows, he begins taking the team on longer and longer runs, sometimes staying out for several days at a time.

Paulsen returns home from a particularly lengthy trip and settles the dogs down in their kennel. However, he discovers that he is unable to enter the cabin. When his wife, Ruth, comes outside she finds him sitting quietly with the dogs, and Paulsen confesses to Ruth that when he is out with the dogs that he doesn't want to come back. Although they had talked about the Iditarod Trail Sled Dog Race prior to this point, and wondered at the insanity of the Mushers who competed in it, it is at this moment, with this confession, that Ruth knows Paulsen will compete.

Having only ever run a small team of dogs Paulsen is severely lacking in experience. In order to run the Iditarod, he will need a team of fifteen or sixteen dogs, and he doesn't own even half that many. He purchases some Canadian sled dogs, Devil, Ortho, and Murphy, and on the drive back home quickly realizes the difference between family pets and Eskimo sled dogs. Before they have gone several miles Devil and Ortho have chewed their way out of their travel kennels and are destroying the back of the truck, and Paulsen says to Ruth that someone will have to ride in the back with the dogs and keep them in. Ruth replies that as Paulsen is the one running the Iditarod that it should be him, and that it will give him a chance to get to know the dogs. Paulsen reluctantly agrees and climbs into the back of the truck. As soon as Ruth starts the truck the dogs leap on Paulsen and he is forced to defend himself. By the time they arrive home, Paulsen's own transformation has begun.

Still lacking experience, Paulsen hitches his team up and goes on several more runs, resulting in numerous wrecks, some of which result in Paulsen losing his team and walking home by himself. (The dogs not only find their own way home, but return long before Paulsen.) After one particular late night run where Paulsen and his team encounter several skunks, with the expected results, Paulsen is relegated to sleeping in the kennel. He finds that sharing sleeping quarters with the dogs increases his bond with them, and even after the smell has worn off he continues to sleep outside. When word gets around that Paulsen plans to compete in the Iditarod, the local community rallies behind him by donating money, food, and essential gear. One neighbor even donates his truck and drives Paulsen and the dogs up to Anchorage, Alaska for the race. When they start to run out of money this neighbor dips into his own savings account to help fund the remainder of the trip and keep Paulsen's dream alive.

Paulsen arrives in Anchorage two months before the race, and quickly realizes just how little he still knows about running the Iditarod. As he prepares himself for the 1,180-mile race, Paulsen constantly asks questions and seeks to learn from the officials and the other, more experienced Mushers. Paulsen's inexperience causes problems right from the first day, when he takes a wrong turn that adds 120-miles to his run. On this detour, Paulsen encounters a moose which, despite being repeatedly shot by a Musher traveling behind him, kills the lead dog of that team. During the 17 and a half days it takes Paulsen to complete the race he experiences sleep deprivation and hallucinations, freezing temperatures and bitingly cold winds, stunning views, and tragic disasters. He also re-evaluates his life and decides that a simple life is better than the pursuit of money and material objects. At the end of the story, Paulsen is diagnosed with coronary heart disease and is told that he will not be able to live a normal life. Before returning home a devastated Paulsen calls a friend and asks him to take all of his dogs except for Cookie, the dog who led his Iditarod team.
