= Joanna Bacalso =

Filipino-Canadian actress

- Born: Joanna Bacalso; Cebu, Philippines
- Other name: Joanna
- Occupations: Actress; model
- Spouse: Matthew Garel

Joanna Bacalso is a Filipino-Canadian television and movie actress and former model.

== Early life ==
Bacalso was born on August 10, 1976 in Cebu, Philippines, and moved to Toronto, Ontario with her two younger brothers when she was eight years old.

== Career ==
Represented by Ford Models, her modeling work included both print and runway for clients, including Tommy Hilfiger and Banana Republic. Bacalso transitioned from a modeling career into film and television. Her television credits include guest starring appearances on the series The Jamie Foxx Show, La Femme Nikita, Veronica's Closet, and Wish You Were Here, alongside Dave Chappelle.

Bacalso played a recurring role on the series by CBS, The District, and a multiple episode supporting role on the series Ally McBeal. Bacalso made her feature film debut in the comedy by Orion Pictures, Car 54, Where Are You? featuring Rosie O'Donnell and Fran Drescher. Bacalso appeared in the feature films Bedazzled and Dude, Where's My Car?. She is most well known for her role as Barb in Disney's Snow Dogs featuring Cuba Gooding, Jr. and James Coburn. She also starred in the movie Half Baked.

== Filmography ==
=== Film ===
Year	Title	Role
1994	Car 54, Where Are You?	Beautiful Woman
1995	No Contest	Malou, Miss Philippines
1998	Half Baked	Henchwoman
1998	Sanctuary	Kelly Kwon
1998	Woo	Stunning Woman
1998	Short for Nothing	Timea
2000	Bedazzled	DV8 Clubgoer
2000	Dude, Where's My Car	Bartender
2001	Gangland	Aniko
2002	Snow Dogs	Barb
2004	My Baby's Daddy	Nia
2007	Bad Girl Island	Sherry Pace
2020	Vide Noir	Frankie Lou

=== Television ===
Year	Title	Role	Notes
1995	Forever Knight	Briana/Angel	Season 2 Episode 25, A More Permanent Hell, (CBS)/Season 3 Episode 1, Black Buddha Part 2, (CBS)
1997	La Femme Nikita	Woman Friend	Season 1 Episode 21, Verdict, (USA)
1998	Veronica's Closet	Kari	Season 1 Episode 20, Veronica's All Nighter (NBC)
1998	The Jamie Foxx Show	Joanna Kennedy	Two Episodes, (WB)
1999	PSI Factor: Chronicles of the Paranormal	Ari'ana	Season 4 Episode 9, Inertia (Syndication)
1999	Das Traumschiff	Cora Stiller	Season 1 Episode 24, Tahiti (ZDF)
2000	The District	Pumpkin/Poo Kim	Season 1 Episode 6, How They Lived (CBS)/Season 1 Episode 8, The Jackal (CBS)
2000–01	Son of the Beach	Firebush	Two Episodes, (FX)
2011	Lost Girl	Female Contender	Season 2 Episode 2, I Fought the Fae, and the Fae Won (SyFy)
2011	The Ron James Show		Season 3 Episode 4, Math Problem (CBC)
2015	Pun Plip Pridays on Kababayan Today	Sketch Comedian	Season 1 Episode 7
2019	SEAL Team	Christine	Four Episodes (CBS)
