= Aaron Frazier =

American actor

- Born: July 21, 1979 (age 46); Chicago, Illinois, U.S.
- Occupation: Actor
- Years active: 2002–2016

Aaron Frazier (born July 21, 1979) is an American retired actor, who is best known for playing Old Weird Harold in the 2004 film Fat Albert.

== Filmography ==
=== Film ===
Year	Title	Role	Notes
2002	Braceface Brandi	Chris	
2003	House of Sand and Fog	Courier	
2004	Fat Albert	Old Weird Harold	
2007	Foster Babies	Guy in barbershop	
2008	Auto Recovery	Slim	
2010	Nobody Smiling	Valet #1	

=== Television ===
Year	Title	Role	Notes
2002	First Monday		Episode: "Court Date"
2004	Joan of Arcadia	Basketball player God	Episode: "The Cat"
2003–2005	The Shield	Yancy/Long John	Episodes: "Coyotes", "String Theory"
2006	The Closer	Pookie	Episode: "Slippin"
2007	Lincoln Heights	Pedestrian	Episode: "Blowback"
2016	Murder in the First	Eddie Moss	Episode: "The Barbers of Seville"
