= Matthew Hall (actor) =

British actor

- Born: Matthew Graham Hall; 10 June 1991 (age 35); Bradford, England
- Occupation: Actor
- Years active: 2006–present

Matthew Hall (born 10 June 1991) is a British actor.

== Education ==
He trained with Stage 84 from a young age and studied at Leeds College of Music on a two-year musical theatre course.

== Work ==
Hall began his work in television working as a supporting artist in programmes, including Emmerdale, A Touch of Frost and My Parents Are Aliens. In 2006, he played lead role Jacko in a BBC Radio 4 drama entitled Mummies and Daddies. The following year, after just missing out on a lead role in Coronation Street, he played Sam Myerson in Series 7's final episode of The Royal. In January 2009 he was in an ITV1 three-part drama called Unforgiven starring Surranne Jones, in which he played the son of Siobhan Finneran and Peter Davison's characters Rufus Ingram. His other work includes the part of Scott Mackay, a young troubled teenager in an episode of the final series of Heartbeat, Tiru in the BBC Radio play 28 by Dawn King and an advert for Neil Hudgell Solicitors.

== Back for Good ==
In February 2010, Hall joined the cast of the touring brand new Take That tribute show Back for Good playing the part of Mark Owen. This was Hall's first long-term professional job. The show has so far been a slow success, with Hall getting rave reviews, including:

"This was an energetic and remarkably accurate journey through the back catalogue with both Daniel Paul Maines as Gary, and Matthew Hall as Mark delivering tone-perfect performances that could almost be considered a masterpiece in mimickery, rather than the usual close approximation achieved by other acts"
