= Fat Albert (film) =

2004 film by Joel Zwick

- Theatrical release poster
- Directed by: Joel Zwick
- Screenplay by: Bill Cosby; Charles Kipps
- Based on: Fat Albert and the Cosby Kids by Bill Cosby
- Produced by: John Davis
- Starring: Kenan Thompson; Kyla Pratt; Bill Cosby
- Cinematography: Paul Elliott
- Edited by: Tony Lombardo
- Music by: Richard Gibbs
- Production companies: 20th Century Fox Animation; Davis Entertainment Company; SAH Enterprises; Filmation Associates; Smiley, Inc.
- Distributed by: 20th Century Fox
- Release date: December 25, 2004
- Running time: 93 minutes
- Country: United States
- Language: English
- Budget: $45 million
- Box office: $48.6 million

Fat Albert is a 2004 American live-action animated comedy film based on the 1972 Filmation animated television series Fat Albert and the Cosby Kids created by Bill Cosby. Kenan Thompson stars as the title character. Fat Albert transforms the cartoon characters into three-dimensional humans, who have to come to grips with the differences that exist between their world and the real world.

The film acts as a continuation of the series; Fat Albert and the gang leave their 1972–85 cartoon world and enter the 2000s real world to help a teenage girl, Doris Robertson (Kyla Pratt), deal with the challenges of being unpopular. The film was released on December 25, 2004, by 20th Century Fox, to generally negative reviews and grossed $48.6 million against a $45 million budget.

== Plot ==
In North Philadelphia, Doris Robertson is a depressed teenager grieving the death of her grandfather and resisting her foster sister Lauri's efforts to engage socially. After Doris learns that her parents will be away for a two-day business trip to the Poconos, she cries and a tear hits her television remote as Fat Albert and the Cosby Kids is on. When the tear opens a portal to the cartoon world, Fat Albert jumps out of the television upon seeing Doris crying.

Rudy, Dumb Donald, Mushmouth, Bucky, and Old Weird Harold jump out, too; Bill tells Russell to stay put and cover for them. Doris insists she is fine, but the gang knows otherwise. When the show ends, they have to wait until tomorrow's show to come back. They follow Doris to school and are amazed by the new technology.

Albert becomes infatuated with Lauri. Reggie, an annoying schoolmate with an obsessive crush on Lauri, challenges Albert to a track race that Albert wins. In another attempt to help Doris, the gang persuades cheerleaders to invite them all to an outdoor party. Doris reluctantly agrees to attend. While at the party, Lauri dances with Albert. Reggie desperately attempts to make her jealous by dancing with Doris. When Lauri does not notice him, he tries to forcibly kiss Doris. Doris yells at him and runs off. Albert warns the boy to stay away from both girls.

The next day, Doris goes to school but asks the gang to go to the park instead of following her. Harold, normally clumsy, joins in a basketball game and is able to play perfectly. Mushmouth, who cannot talk normally, is taught how to speak by a little girl. Donald goes to the library, where he can read and remove his pink face-covering hat.

When Doris takes them home, the first three gang members – Bucky, Harold, and Donald – jump into the television. Breaking News interrupts the show before the last four can enter. Albert, Doris, and Bill argue in private about going back. Albert wants to stay in the real world, while Bill says otherwise. The gang takes Doris and Lauri to the fair on a junk-made car. Doris says she would date Rudy if he were a real person when he asks.

Searching for guidance, Fat Albert meets his creator, Bill Cosby, and tells him of the dilemma. Though frightened and skeptical at first, Cosby explains that his character is based his old childhood friend Albert Robertson (who is revealed to be Doris' grandfather), which explains Doris' confusion over why Fat Albert seems so familiar. Mr. Cosby warns Fat Albert he has to return to the cartoon world, or he will turn into celluloid dust.

Devastated, Albert tells Lauri he must leave, but she thinks he is being insensitive. The next day, Mushmouth, Rudy, and Bill jump back into the television. Albert goes to a track meet where Doris and Lauri are competing and encourages Doris to a victory. Reggie, who witnessed that the gang is from the television, attempts to threaten Albert, who pushes him aside. Albert rushes to the girls' house on a borrowed skateboard. He says goodbye to Doris and Lauri and jumps back into the television, where he takes back the focus of the show from a gang of bullies that threatened to do so earlier in the film, as seen by Russell, who was attacked and bullied by them.

Sometime later, Cosby, his brother, and their friends who helped inspire the cartoon characters from the show stand in front of Albert Robertson's grave. As the camera pans on each of the men, images of their counterparts are seen. Doris watches from afar as the old men race away, showing that they are still kids at heart, the same kids from the television show that they helped Bill Cosby inspire. Before the ending credits start, Fat Albert encourages the audience to finish watching the credits and help each other.

== Cast ==
- Kenan Thompson as "Fat" Albert Robertson
- Kyla Pratt as Doris Robertson
- Bill Cosby as "Cartoon-Albert" and himself
  - Keith Robinson as William Henry "Bill" Cosby Jr., a fictional younger version of Cosby
- Dania Ramirez as Lauri Robertson
- Shedrack Anderson III as Rudolph "Rudy" Davis
- Marques Houston as "Dumb" Donald Parker
- Jermaine Williams as James "Mushmouth" Mush
- Aaron Frazier as "Old Weird" Harold Simmons
  - James E. Bynum as Old "Old Weird" Harold Simmons
- Alphonso McAuley as Bucky Miller
- Omarion as Reggie
- J. Mack Slaughter Jr. as Arthur
- Alice Greczyn as Becky
- Rick Overton as Coach Gillespie
- Keri Lynn Pratt as Heather
- Dylan Cash as Emmitt
- Aaron Carter as Darren (credited as "Teen")
- Fonzworth Bentley as Salesman (as Derek "Mr. Bentley" Watkins)
- Raven-Symoné as Danielle (voice)
- Jeremy Suarez as Russell Cosby (voice)
  - Russell Cosby as himself
- Earl Billings as Mudfoot Brown (voice)
- Catero Colbert as Lead Teen (voice)
- Charles Duckworth as Teen #1 (voice)
- Ben Diskin as Teen #2 (voice)
- Josh Uhler as Teen #3 (voice)
- Bill Ratner as Announcer (voice)
- Jeff Garlin as Jerry (uncredited)
- Joel Madden as Classmate with Mohawk (uncredited)

== Production ==
Pre-production originally began in 1993 with Tracy Morgan slotted to play Fat Albert. However, it soon entered development hell as no studio was interested in the project.

The project was picked up again in 2001 with Omar Benson Miller being cast as the titular character with Forest Whitaker serving as director. However, production stalled again following reported clashes between Miller and Whitaker with Bill Cosby. This resulted in Whitaker being replaced with Joel Zwick. Additional cast for the prior iteration included Kel Mitchell, Lahmard J Tate, Aaron Frazier, Neko Parham, and Alphonso McAuley as Dumb Donald. When Zwick came on board, he retained Frazier and McAuley but choose to cast McAuley as Bucky instead.

Afterwards, open casting calls were held in New York City and Los Angeles in hopes of finding an unknown child actor to play the titular character, but this proved futile and the role was eventually offered to Kenan Thompson.

David Gordon Green expressed interest in directing the film and claimed he lobbied for the director's chair by writing a letter to Cosby.

== Home media ==
Fat Albert was released on VHS and DVD on March 22, 2005.

== Reception ==
=== Box office ===
The film grossed $48.1 million in the United States and a total of $48.6 million worldwide, against a $45 million budget.

=== Critical response ===
On the review aggregator website Rotten Tomatoes, 23% of 90 critics' reviews are positive, with an average rating of 4.4/10. The website's consensus reads: "A bland but good-natured adaptation of the cartoon show." Metacritic, which uses a weighted average, assigned the film a score of 39 out of 100, based on 26 critics, indicating "generally unfavorable" reviews. Audiences polled by CinemaScore gave the film an average grade of "A−" on an A+ to F scale.

Roger Ebert gave the film two stars out of a possible four, writing, "The movie is sweet and gentle, but not very compelling."
