= Julio Bekhor =

Mexican actor and artist

Julio Bekhór (born July 30, 1976) is a Mexican actor and artist.

== Early life ==
Julio Alejandro Cadena Cárdenas was born in Mexico City on July 30, 1976. At age seven, he began taking classes at Silvia Derbez acting school and later at Gonzalo Correa's acting academy. Later in 1995 his mother died so he decides to follow an acting career professionally. In 1997 he started acting training in the Actores del Método acting studio (Strasberg method) under the tutelage of René Pereyra. He appeared in many plays including After Death and Midnight's Summer Dream. Now living by himself he starts modeling in television commercials for brands such as Coca-Cola, Volkswagen and Sabritas and in editorial advertising campaigns.

== Career ==
In 1996, he made his film debut in the movie The Hole by Beto Gómez. He continued studying and after five years at Actores del Metodo he enrolls at the school of Ludwik Margules and M & M Estudio, school of the actress Patricia Reyes Spíndola. Both schools totally different in acting techniques, one focusing on theater acting and the other on T.V technique.

In 1998, he began rehearsals of Les maids by Jean Genet directed by Natalia Traven and produced by Reyes Spíndola. At M & M Studio, he took acting and directing coursework with director's Arturo Ripstein and Pastor Vega.

In 1999, he began his first television project for Televisa in the telenovela Amigas y Rivales, produced by Emilio Larrosa. Bekhor played the rebellious and cocky villain Javier. At the same time, he wrote a column for the magazine 15 a 20 under the pseudonym Julio Cadena, and worked as a DJ in bars and for private parties.

He made some telenovelas for Televisa and decided to stop doing television to focus on film and music. In 2003, he made his American film debut with Broken Lizard's Club Dread (El club del Miedo) directed by Jay Chandrasekar. In the same year, he was cast to play Luis in the film Sea of Dreams (Mar de sueños), José Bojorquez's debut feature film alongside Sonia Braga, Angélica María, Nicholas Gonzales and Seymour Cassell.

After completing this project he moved to Los Angeles, California where he lived for eight years. He started to train at the Ivana Chubbuck Acting Studio under Cubbuck's direction, among other acting teachers and worked on accent reduction with Bob and Claire Corff. During this time he filmed the independent film Age of Kali directed by Rafal Zielinski and participated in episodes of the series Dirt and Swingtown.

In 2010 Bekhor returned to Mexico to participate in Mujeres Asesinas Series and Que show con Alejandra Bogue. He later starred in the film Dark Seduction (Oscura Seducción) starring Elizabeth Cervantes directed by Walter Doehner. In 2012 he began filming Casi Treinta, Alejandro Suguich debut film starring Eiza Gonzales. He plays the emotional character "El Agri".

In 2013, he starred in the film She is Ramona (Ella es Ramona), directed by Hugo Rodríguez, written by Beto Cohen and produced by Alebrije Cine y Video. A romantic comedy where Julio is the non judgemental love interest of Ramona, played by Andrea Ortega Lee. With this film Julio made one of his dreams come true by working with actors Maria Rojo and Daniel Jimenez Cacho.

Later in 2013, he starts working on the pre production of his first film as director and producer, entitled Tripping - Thru Keta (El Viaje de Keta), written and produced by Beto Cohen. The film was produced by Santiago Ortiz Monasterio, Claudia del Castillo, and Mónica Lozano. The soundtrack includes new music from Fred Schneider (frontman of The B-52's). The songs title is Keta's Adventure and its produced by Bryan Hardgroove from Public Enemy, he also writes and produced the song Ahora Sé, sung by Regina Orozco and Te Huele el Chocho sung by Thelma la Perra.

== Filmography ==
- El Agujero (1997)
- Popis (2003)
- Club Dread (2004)
- Sea of Dreams (2005)
- Age of Kali (2006)
- Casi Tr3inta (2014)
- Ella es Ramona (2015)
- 3 Idiotas (2017)
- Loca por el trabajo (2018)
- El Viaje de Keta (2018 Directorial debut)
