= Al Faris =

Al Faris play
- Written by: Moayad Al Shaybani & Marwan Rahbani
- Characters: Ghassan Saliba, Balqees, Jihad Al Attrash, Nazih Yousef, Maya Yammine, Boutros Hanna, Romeo Hachem, Kamil Yousef
- Original language: Arabic
- Genre: Fantasy Musical
- Setting: Dubai World trade center, sheikh Rashid Hall

Premiere
- Date premiered: Wednesday, 6th - Saturday, 9 January 2016
- Place premiered: Dubai
- Official website

Al Faris (مسرحية الفارس) is a play inspired by the poems of Sheikh Mohammed bin Rashid Al Maktoum, UAE Vice President and Prime Minister and Ruler of Dubai, in cooperation with the Rahbani brothers.

== Plot ==
The musical play showcases a bunch of many talented young actors, singers, and professional dancers. The story is about a knight named by Faris trying to build a Utopian city for the people to be united together but he has some challenges and difficulties because of the kidnapping of his loved one Shumoos (the female leader) and gets very confused between helping his beloved and building a city. He struggles through his way and will face many obstacles but he will be guided by a messenger or a wise man. He tries to give him wise advice and tries to enlighten him through his wisdom and thoughts. The Knight then starts to get the message behind the wise man's words and tries to save his beloved and create a city that unites people together. The play's poems that are performed are all written by his highness Sheikh Mohammed bin Rashid Al Maktoum and also the music is composed by an orchestra, the characters in the play speak the Arabic language with an Emirati accent. The play introduces many different elements such as horse parades and lighting effects. The production took many years to be created and it is a huge production in Dubai with the help of Brand Dubai. "Al Faris features verses from 30 poems carefully selected from 150 poems of His Highness Sheikh Mohammed bin Rashid Al Maktoum. The integration of the verses into the narrative gave the script an epic flavour. The Emirati poet Saif Al Saadi supervised the diction of the actors to ensure it was true to the speech rhythms of the Emirati dialect. Ghady Rahbani and Moayad Al Shaybani developed the story and scenario of the play".

== Cast ==
- Ghassan Saliba as Al Faris
- Balqees as Shomoos
- Jihad Al Attrash as the Wiseman
- Nazih Yousef as Ghiran
- Maya Yammine as Al Medyafa
- Boutros Hanna as Shehab
- Romeo Hachem as the Merchant
- Kamil Yousef as the Caravan Man
- General Supervision/Directed by Marwan Rahbani
- Story & Scenario Moayad Al Shaybani & Marwan Rahbani
- Produced by Brand Dubai

== Production ==
Rahbani production Company produces and organize concerts and large events on the Arab and international levels. The company was launched from Lebanon and the United Arab Emirates to make for itself within three decades a special position thanks to its creative production that has earned recognition and won many regional and international awards for its innovation and high quality in production. The company was founded in 1977 by director Marwan Rahbani and joined them later his brother Ghady Rahbani, and the company is still going on today in the leading and creative career in this field. "The production is also the part of the Dubai Government initiative, Brand Dubai, which aims to underscore the culture and heritage of the UAE. The flavors in this musical are deeply rooted in the UAE culture".

== Reviews ==
According to Gulf News, "Al Faris (The Knight), described as a unique contribution to Arab theater, breaks new ground in many aspects of production due to the innovative techniques being used to tell a compelling, allegorical story about a warrior's journey". Another review was by Khaleej times, "Al Faris, a landmark production in the history of Arab theatre, is the product of the third cooperation between Dubai and Rahbani Productions, after Al Mutanabbi in 2001 and Zenobia in 2007". Moreover, Emirates 247 said, "A fantasy musical, Al Faris provokes a deep philosophical contemplation on timeless values ranging from love and humanity to leadership, courage and wisdom".
