= My Baby's Daddy =

- Theatrical release poster
- Directed by: Cheryl Dunye
- Written by: Eddie Griffin; Coke Daniels; Brent Goldberg; David Wagner
- Produced by: Eddie Griffin; Happy Walters; Matt Weaver
- Starring: Anthony Anderson; Eddie Griffin; Michael Imperioli; Method Man; John Amos; Paula Jai Parker; Bai Ling; Joanna Bacalso
- Cinematography: Glen MacPherson
- Edited by: Andy Blumenthal
- Music by: Richard Gibbs
- Production companies: Miramax Films; Brillstein-Grey Entertainment; Immortal Entertainment
- Distributed by: Miramax Films
- Release date: January 9, 2004
- Running time: 86 minutes
- Country: United States
- Language: English
- Budget: $12 million
- Box office: $18.5 million

My Baby's Daddy is a 2004 American comedy film directed by Cheryl Dunye and starring Anthony Anderson, Eddie Griffin, Michael Imperioli, and Method Man.

== Plot ==
Childhood friends Lonnie, G, and Dominic have a rude awakening when they find out their girlfriends are pregnant. Lonnie and G have sons names Carver and Bruce-Leroy, and Dominic has a daughter named Jasmine.

Each have their own unique set of problems; Lonnie's girlfriend Rolonda is more interested in partying than being a mother; Dominic discovers that his girlfriend Nia is a lesbian and has fallen in love with her midwife; while G, an aspiring boxer, is unable to fully commit to his girlfriend Xixi.

Throughout the movie, all three men, particularly G and Dominic, are determined to continue their normal way of living and be fathers at the same time. Lonnie is a garbage man among other part-time jobs, G works in the store Xixi's family runs, and Dominic is managing a pair of white rappers called the Stylz Brothas, until they fire him.

After they momentarily lose their kids during a party they threw, they realize how much their kids depend on them, and gradually become responsible fathers. Lonnie falls in love with a woman from a Mommy and Me class named Brandy who he treats badly on date, due to believing she would not like the real him. Nia feels Dominic is too involved in his career to ever be a father. G's cousin No Good robs a store to help him get the supplies for his son and Xixi feels he was in on it and takes Bruce-Leroy away from him.

After all three are given a talking to by Lonnie's Uncle Virgil, they realize how much they love their kids and what they have to do. Lonnie apologizes to Brandy, but he stays true to himself, and she forgives him, then he storms to Rolonda's house and takes Carver with him, while criticizing her for having a baby to get child support payments and knocks out her cousin "Big Swoll". Dominic goes to Nia and tells her how much he loves Jasmine and how he needs to be a part of her life. Xixi's father bonds with G by explaining his past in the Triads, but cleaned up his life to be a good father; so he can understand the trio's brotherhood. Inspired, G proposes to Xixi.

At the end of the movie, it is revealed that Lonnie and Brandy get married. Lonnie has also achieved his dream of becoming a successful inventor; Dominic started a children's music album; and G and his father-in-law open a martial arts/boxing studio called The Mo Fo Dojo. No Good, after learning of organic foods, goes on to become a successful food show personality called The Organic Gangster. They lastly toast to great babies' daddies. In the end, they realize that three little babies turned them into three grown men.

== Cast ==
- Anthony Anderson as "G", He tries to speak Chinese to impress Xixi's father, but he gets pronouns wrong.
- Eddie Griffin as Lonnie
- Michael Imperioli as Dominic
- Method Man as Randall "No Good", G's ex con cousin.
- Paula Jai Parker as Rolonda, Lonnie's gold-digging girlfriend.
- Bai Ling as "XiXi"
- Joanna Bacalso as Nia, She leaves Dominic for her midwife.
- Amy Sedaris as Annabelle
- Marsha Thomason as Brandy
- Bobb'e J. Thompson as "Lil' Tupac"
- Tommy "Tiny" Lister as "Drive By"
- John Amos as Uncle Virgil
- Bryan Ho as Dang Ling, XiXi's little brother

== Production ==
Principal Photography took place from September 9 to November 4, 2002 in Toronto, Ontario, Canada while exterior shots were filmed in Philadelphia, Pennsylvania.

== Reception ==
This movie has a 6% approval rating on Rotten Tomatoes based on 52 reviews of which only three were fresh, with an average rating of 2.9/10. The site's consensus reads, "Full of poop jokes, broad racial stereotyping, and other tired gags, My Baby's Daddy makes the absolute least of a decent premise". On Metacritic, the film has a score of 23 out of 100 based on 15 critics, indicating "generally unfavorable reviews".
