= Natalia Paruz =

Musical saw player

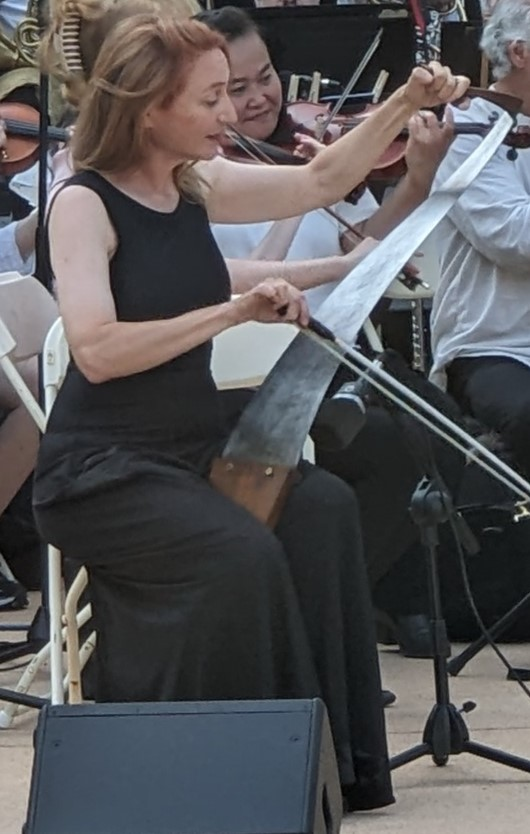
- Natalia Paruz

Background information
- Also known as: Saw Lady
- Born
- Genres: Classical, Contemporary, Pop
- Occupations: Musical saw player Busker; Bell Ringer
- Instruments: Musical saw, handbells, cowbells
- Labels: Atlantic Records, Capitol Records, Universal Records
- Website: sawlady.com

Natalia 'Saw Lady' Paruz is a New York City-based musical saw player, bell ringer, busker and film maker. She was the founder and director of the annual Musical Saw Festival in New York City and ran it for 11 years. She also organized the musical saw festival in Israel. She was a columnist of the 'Saw Player News' and a judge at international musical saw competitions. She was also a judge for Music Under New York and for Little Island at Pier 55.

Paruz has played the musical saw on many film soundtracks and can be seen as well as heard in the movie Dummy starring Adrien Brody. She has performed with orchestras such as the Israel Philharmonic Orchestra (conducted by Zubin Mehta), the Westchester Philharmonic, the Royal Air Moroccan Symphony Orchestra, the Amor Artis Orchestra, the Riverside Orchestra, the Manhattan Chamber Orchestra and at Lincoln Center's Avery Fisher Hall with PDQ Bach composer Peter Schickele and with the Little Orchestra Society. November 2007 marked her Carnegie Hall debut as a musical saw soloist and June 2008 her Madison Square Garden debut. Her musical saw can be heard in many TV commercials. She has also appeared on numerous TV and radio programs around the world. Garrison Keillor of the Prairie Home Companion radio show has dubbed Natalia the show's 'official saw player'. As a studio musician, her musical saw has been recorded by labels such as Atlantic Records, Capitol Records, and Universal Records, for albums of composers such as John Hiatt and Elliot Goldenthal. She has played at festivals, such as the Spoleto Festival USA, the Lincoln Center Out-of-Doors Festival, Utah Arts Festival, World Trade Center's Buskers Fair and at the Fingerlakes Chamber Music Festival.

Paruz often plays the musical saw in contemporary music, encouraging today's composers to write music for this instrument.

Paruz is considered to be the most knowledgeable about the history of the musical saw, and her own home is a pilgrimage place for saw enthusiasts and students.

The December 3, 2011 'Washington Post' crossword puzzle had Paruz as a question: "Down 5 - Instrument played by Natalia Paruz".

Along with her professional career, Paruz makes a point to also perform on the streets and subways as a busker. She has busked in the US, Italy, Israel, Czech Republic, Poland and France. Paruz has also served as a judge at the Music Under New York auditions for subway musicians.

Paruz also plays a set of 65 pitched cowbells, English handbells, 4-in-hand hand bells, theremin and glass harp. She developed a bell ringing technique called 6-in-hand, and she performs as a musical historic interpreter of Colonial and Victorian times at places such as Historic Richmond Town.

== Awards and honors ==
Paruz is a recipient of many awards, including:

- a citation of honor from the New York City Council
- a citation of honor from the New York State Senate
- a medal of honor from Paris, France.
- She was chosen for the 'Best of New York' list of the 'Village Voice' two years in a row, as well as for the lists of 'Time Out New York', the 'New York Press' and the 'New York Resident'.
- Paruz is a recipient of grants from the Queens Council on the Arts, New York City Department of Cultural Affairs and New York State Council on the Arts.
- In 2009 Paruz organized the Guinness World Record of the 'Largest Musical Saw Ensemble', which gathered 53 musical saw players to perform together.
- In 2010 NYC Mayor Michael Bloomberg issued a proclamation honoring the annual Musical Saw Festival Natalia organizes since 2003.
- In 2011 NY State Assembly member Aravella Simotas issued a citation of honor proclaiming the NYC Musical Saw Festival for its "9 years of artistic excellence in Astoria".
- In 2013 Queens Borough President Helen Marshall issued a proclamation declaring June 1, 2013 to be the ‘Natalia Paruz & Musical Saw Festival Day’ in Queens.

== Books mentioning Paruz ==
- City Lights: Stories About New York/St. Martin's Press
- New York Curiosities: Quirky Characters, Roadside Oddities & Other Offbeat Stuff/Globe Pequot
- Surprise: Embrace the Unpredictable and Engineer the Unexpected/Penguin Random House
- 120 Jobs that Won't Chain You to Your Desk/Random House
- The Savvy Musician/Helius Press
- Overlooked New York/CreateSpace, by Zina Saunders
- Sounds of the Underground/Heidi Younger
- Teach a Man to Fish and Other Stories/Richard A. Schrader, Sr.
- Book in Czech - Zápisky osamělého poutníka s autoharfou/Martin Žák
- The Designs of Carrie Robbins/The United States Institute for Theatre Technology in cooperation with Broadway Press
- Buskers/Soft Skull Press
- Tampa Review 42/University of Tampa Press
- Get Lucky (How to Put Planned Serendipity to Work for You & Your Business)/Jossey-Bass
- Book in Spanish - Diario de un Músico Callejero/José Miguel Vilar, Editorial Renacimiento
- The Noise Beneath the Apple, by Heather Jacks
- Starting Your Career as a Musician/Skyhorse Publishing, Inc, by Neil Tortorella
- Music in American Life - An Encyclopedia of the Songs, Styles, Stars, and Stories That Shaped Our Culture/Greenwood
- Music Business Hacks: The Daily Habits of the Self-Made Musician/PACE Publishing
- The Sound of Mark/Mark Hastings - Zeloo Media
- An Immigrant's Guide to Making It In America/Virgilia Kaur Pruthi
- Book in Polish - Handbook of the Best Practices of 9 American & Canadian Cultural Institutions/Katarzyna Renes, Paderewski Institute, Poland
- Subway Beats/Kurt Boone, published by Schiffer Publishing
- Much Ado About Magic/Shanna Swendson, published in 2012 by Nla Digital LLC. The first page of the first chapter mentions a woman playing musical saw at the busking spot Natalia plays at.
- Outside the Jukebox: How I Turned My Vintage Music Obsession into My Dream Gig/Scott Bradlee, Hachette Books
- Holistic Wealth: 32 Life Lessons to Help You Find Purpose, Prosperity, and Happiness/Keisha Blair, Published by Catalyst Books
- Flea Circus Time Capsule (Spanish Edition)/Xavi Puk, chapter 10
- 88 MORE Ways Music Can Change Your Life/Vincent James and Joann Pierdomenico
- Tell Her She Can't: Inspiring Stories of Unstoppable Women/Kelly Lewis, pages 143–147, 154, 192
- Passion For Practice With Musings From Music Masters/Becky Chaffee, page 37
- Lonely Planet Pocket New York City, published in 2024, page 35
- Life Lessons: How I've Learned To Embrace Gratitude, Positivity, Resilience, And Joy/Bob Violino, published in 2025

== Movie soundtracks with musical saw by Paruz ==
Year	Title	Directed By	Notes
2002	Dummy	Greg Pritikin	with Adrien Brody
2006	El Carnaval de Sodoma	Arturo Ripstein	Mexico
2008	I Sell the Dead	Glenn McQuaid	
2008	American Carny	Nick Basile	
2008	Bend & Bow	Ted Fisher	
2009	The Heart Is a Drum Machine	Christopher Pomerenke	
2009	Lullaby	Ben Westbrook	
2011	Another Earth	Mike Cahill	Searchlight Pictures
2012	Strings	Tal Arbiv	
2014	Time Out of Mind	Oren Moverman	with Richard Gere
2014	Rhythm in Motion	Jenny Schweitzer	
2015	The Jinx: The Life and Deaths of Robert Durst	Andrew Jarecki	HBO series
2015	Caihong City	Florina Titz	
2015	Subway: The Series	Veronica Dang	
2016	Miss Stevens	Julia Hart	
2016	Naked-Spurious	Glenn English	
2017	Amanda & Jack Go Glamping	Brandon Dickerson	
2019	Scenes from the Underground	Eric Swiz	
2020	Lost city	Max Cea	
2020	Like a Wild Plant	Natalia Paruz	Finalist at Astoria Film Festival
2021	Belleview Love Story	Michael Wolfe (filmmaker)	
2021	The Healing Melody: The Dr Haris Gershom Story	Devarshi Barot	
2022	For the Lost Children of Paris	Carrie Robbins	
2023	While Mortals Sleep	Natalia Paruz	Audience Award at Astoria Film Festival
2024	Megalopolis	Francis Ford Coppola	
2024	Joker: Folie à Deux	Todd Phillips	Warner Bros. Pictures
2025	On the End	Ari Selinger	
2026	Bucks Harbor	Pete Muller (photographer)	National Geographic
2026	The Black Chapel	Ky Woo	
2026	Edward	Elliot Lobell	
2026	The Buskers New York		American Public Television

== Theater soundtracks with musical saw by Paruz ==
- Monkey: Journey to the West, music by Damon Albarn (live show 2008)
- Midsummer Night's Dream, music by Elliot Goldenthal (album recording 2013)
- SawBones, music by Scott Munson (live show 2014)
- Clockwork Metaphysics, music by Stefano Bechini (live show 2015)
- Simon Dawes Becomes a Planet, music by Jared Dembowski (live show 2016)
- The Dragon Griswynd, music by Scott Munson (live show 2018)
- A La Memoire Des Enfants Perdus, music by Scott Munson (staged readings 2019)
- The Mouthtrap, music by Henry Purcell (soundtrack recording 2019)

== Discography ==
- Singing Sounds of Saw (cassette)
- Hark! an Angel Sings (2002)
- I Saw the Future (2011)
- Playing on the Edge (2020)

== See also ==
- NYC Busker Ball
- Busking

== Filmography ==
Natalia Paruz appears as herself in the documentary film Busking the System, which examines the lives of New York City subway buskers and features her work as a musical saw performer.
