= The Art of Letting Go (disambiguation) =

"The Art of Letting Go" is a 2013 song by American singer-songwriter Mariah Carey.

The Art of Letting Go may also refer to:

- The Art of Letting Go (album), a 2024 album by Myles Kennedy, or its title song
- "The Art of Letting Go", a song by Pat Benatar from Seven the Hard Way
- "The Art of Letting Go", a song by Mikaila from Mikaila
- "The Art of Letting Go", a song by the Stone Temple Pilots from Stone Temple Pilots (2018)
