= Amy Acker =

American actress (born 1976)

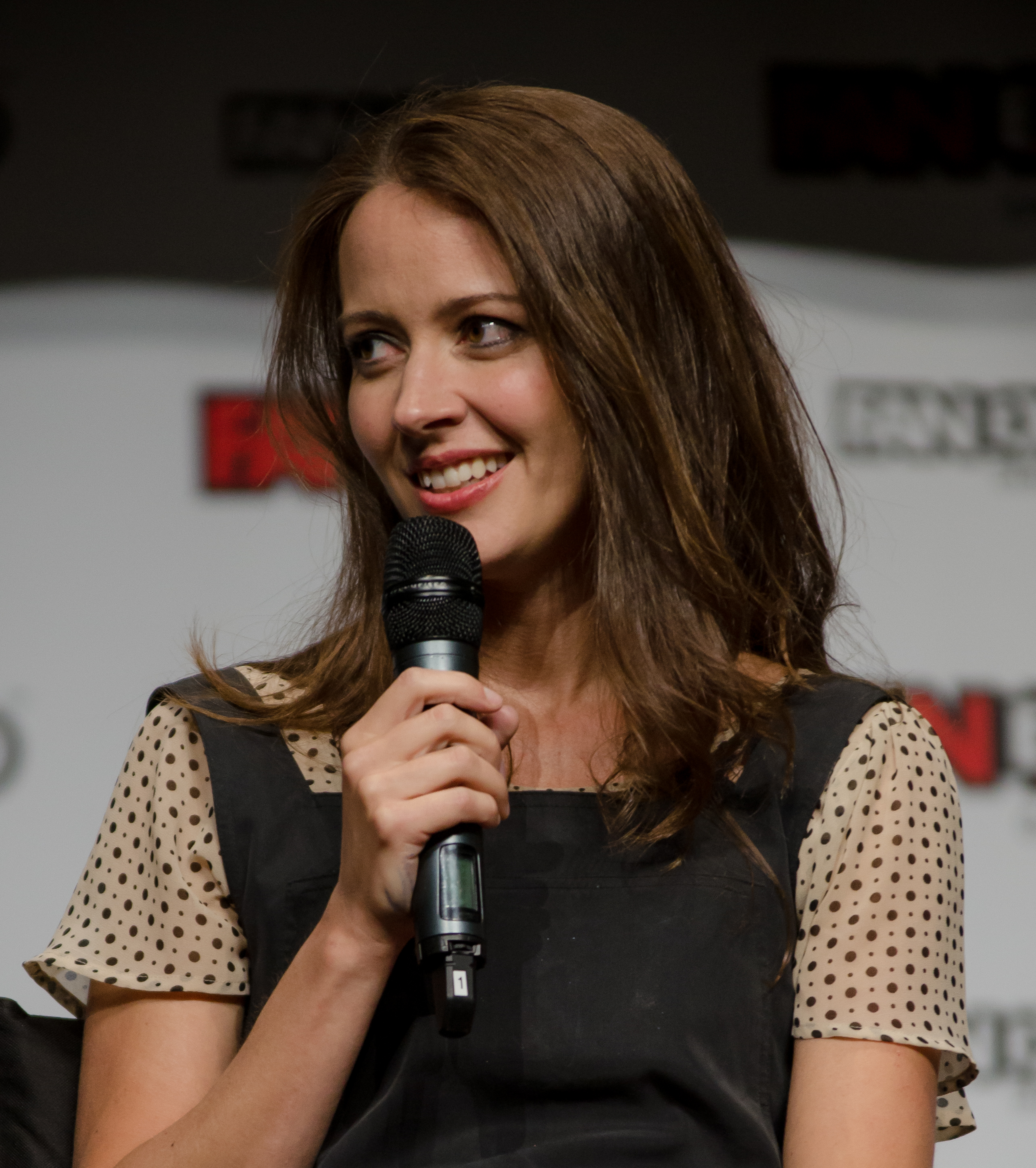
- Acker in 2015
- Born: Amy Louise Acker; December 5, 1976 (age 49); Dallas, Texas, U.S.
- Education: Southern Methodist University (BFA)
- Occupation: Actress
- Years active: 1997–present
- Spouse: James Carpinello (m. 2003)
- Children: 2
- Website: amyacker.com

Amy Louise Acker (born December 5, 1976) is an American actress. She is best known for starring as Winifred Burkle and Illyria on the supernatural drama series Angel (2001–2004), as Kelly Peyton on the action drama series Alias (2005–2006), and as Root on the science-fiction drama series Person of Interest (2012–2016). From 2017 to 2019, she starred as Caitlin Strucker on the superhero drama series The Gifted, based on Marvel Comics' X-Men.

== Early life ==
Amy Louise Acker was born and raised in Dallas, Texas, the eldest of four children. Her mother is a homemaker and her father is a lawyer. She studied ballet and modern dance for fourteen years, but ended her lessons while in high school after an operation on one of her knees. She graduated from Lake Highlands High School in Dallas in 1995, and subsequently earned a bachelor's degree in theater from Southern Methodist University in 1999.

In her junior year of college, Acker modeled for the J. Crew catalog. She worked as a stage actress for several seasons, including a stint at American Players Theatre in Spring Green, Wisconsin.

== Career ==
Acker made her major television debut when she starred as Winifred "Fred" Burkle in Angel (seasons 2–5), and also as the character of Illyria for part of the show's fifth and final season. She won the 2003 Saturn Award for Best Supporting Actress on Television for her portrayal.

Acker joined the cast of Alias in 2005 for its final season, playing villainess Kelly Peyton. Acker graduated from guest star to cast member as the show entered the final episodes in April and May 2006. Also in 2005, Acker provided voice acting for the character of Huntress (Helena Rosa Bertinelli) on the animated series Justice League Unlimited. She went on to make a guest appearance on How I Met Your Mother, in which she was reunited with Angel co-star Alexis Denisof, who had a recurring role on the show.

Acker portrayed Dr. Claire Saunders/Whiskey, a recurring character, on Joss Whedon's Dollhouse. She guest-starred in 10 of the 13 episodes of the first season and three episodes of the second.

In 2010, Acker was a series regular in the ABC drama Happy Town, portraying the character Rachel Conroy. That same year, she starred in the season-one finale of the Fox series Human Target as the mysterious Katherine Walters. On May 25, 2010, she appeared on CBS's The Good Wife. She appeared in the horror movie The Cabin in the Woods, released April 13, 2012. In 2012, she made guest performances in Warehouse 13, Once Upon a Time, and Grimm. Also in 2012, she starred as Beatrice in Joss Whedon's film Much Ado About Nothing.

Acker appeared in season three of the sitcom Husbands as Claudia, Brad Kelly's ex-fiancée who unexpectedly shows up. In March 2014, Acker was cast as Audrey Nathan, a former lover to Phil Coulson in an episode of Agents of S.H.I.E.L.D.

Between 2012 and 2016, Acker portrayed Samantha "Root" Groves on the CBS drama Person of Interest; Groves became a regular character starting in the series' third season. Starting with the series' 100th episode, Acker took on the voice role of the Machine. In the series finale, she also appeared as the visual manifestation of the Machine.

In March 2017, Acker was cast as Caitlin Strucker in the pilot for the prospective Fox television series The Gifted, which was picked up to series in May 2017. The Gifted began airing on October 2, 2017, and Fox canceled the series after two seasons on April 17, 2019.

Following the conclusion of The Gifted, Acker was cast in 2019 as Kathleen Shepherd, the fourth sister of Derek Shepherd, in an episode of ABC's Grey's Anatomy. She followed this with a recurring arc as Catherine in the third season of Fox's 9-1-1: Lone Star in 2022.

Acker returned to a main cast role in 2023, starring as Tory in Freeform's mystery thriller The Watchful Eye. She also appeared in the 2024 theatrical film Ordinary Angels, starring Hilary Swank.

== Personal life ==
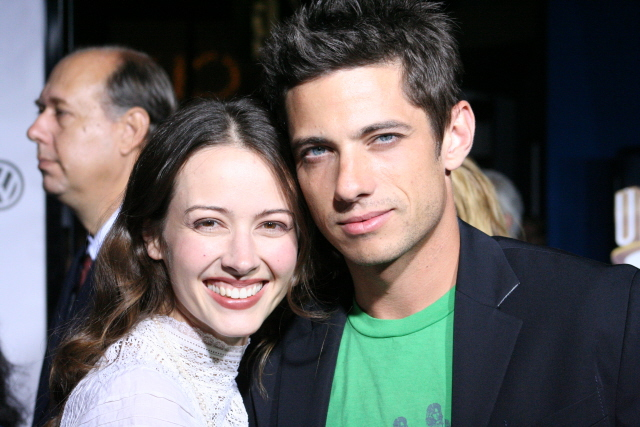
Acker with her husband, James Carpinello, in 2005

Acker married actor James Carpinello in 2003.

== Filmography ==
=== Film ===
Year	Title	Role	Notes
2001	The Accident	Nina	
2002	Groom Lake	Kate	
2002	Catch Me If You Can	Miggy	
2006	The Novice	Jill Yarrut	
2009	21 and a Wake-Up	Caitlin Murphy	
2011	Sironia	Molly Fisher	
2012	The Cabin in the Woods	Wendy Lin	
2012	Much Ado About Nothing	Beatrice	
2014	Let's Kill Ward's Wife	Gina	
2016	The Energy Specialist	Claire	
2017	Amanda & Jack Go Glamping	Amanda	
2020	Superman: Red Son	Lois Lane (voice)	Direct-to-video
2020	Outside	Woman	Short film; also co-director
2024	Ordinary Angels	Theresa	
2024	Average Joe	Denise	
2025	The Unbreakable Boy	Lori	
TBA	Invader	Diane	Announced October 2025

=== Television ===
Year	Title	Role	Notes
1997	Wishbone	Priscilla / Catherine Morland / Venus	Episodes: "A Bone of Contention", "Pup Fiction", "The Roamin' Nose"
1999	To Serve and Protect	Melissa Jorgensen	Episode: "Part II"
2001–2004	Angel	Winifred "Fred" Burkle / Illyria	Recurring role (season 2); Main role (seasons 3–5)
2003	Return to the Batcave: The Misadventures of Adam and Burt	Bonnie Lindsay	Television film (CBS)
2004	Johnny Bravo	Jackie, Cashier (voice)	Episode: "Double Vision"
2005	Supernatural	Andrea Barr	Episode: "Dead in the Water"
2005–2006	Justice League Unlimited	Huntress / Helena Bertinelli (voice)	4 episodes
2005–2006	Alias	Kelly Peyton	Main role (season 5); 13 episodes
2006	How I Met Your Mother	Penelope	Episode: "Come On"
2007	Drive	Kathryn Tully	3 episodes
2007	Law & Order: Criminal Intent	Leslie LeZard	Episode: "Smile"
2007	Ghost Whisperer	Tessa	Episode: "Weight of What Was"
2008	Voices	Ellie Daly	Television film (a.k.a. A Near Death Experience)
2008	Fire and Ice: The Dragon Chronicles	Princess Luisa	Television film (Syfy)
2008	October Road	Girl in Blue Uniform / Jenny Bristol	2 episodes
2008	Private Practice	Molly Madison	Episode: "A Family Thing"
2009–2010	Dollhouse	Dr. Claire Saunders / Whiskey	Recurring role; 14 episodes
2010	Human Target	Katherine Walters	Episode: "Christopher Chance"
2010	The Good Wife	Trish Arkin	Episode: "Running"
2010	Happy Town	Rachel Conroy	Main role; 8 episodes
2010	No Ordinary Family	Amanda Grayson	Episodes: "No Ordinary Mobster", "No Ordinary Accident"
2011	Dear Santa	Crystal Carruthers	Television film (Lifetime)
2011, 2013	CSI: Crime Scene Investigation	Sandy Colfax	Episodes: "Man Up", "Backfire"
2012	Grimm	Lena Marcenko	Episode: "Tarantella"
2012	Once Upon a Time	Astrid / Nova	Episode: "Dreamy"
2012	Warehouse 13	Tracey	Episode: "The Ones You Love"
2012–2016	Person of Interest	Samantha "Root" Groves	Guest role (season 1); Recurring role (season 2); Main role (seasons 3–5); 65 episodes
2013	Scooby-Doo! Mystery Incorporated	Nova (voice)	4 episodes
2014	Agents of S.H.I.E.L.D.	Audrey Nathan	Episode: "The Only Light in the Darkness"
2015	A Novel Romance	Sophie	Television film (Hallmark)
2015–2019	Suits	Esther Litt-Edelstein	5 episodes (seasons 5, 8–9)
2016–2017	MacGyver	Sarah Adler	Episodes: "Metal Saw", "Screwdriver"
2016	A Nutcracker Christmas	Lily	Television film (Hallmark)
2017–2019	The Gifted	Caitlin Strucker	Main role
2019	What Just Happened??! with Fred Savage	Dr. Rachel Layne	Episode: "Family"
2019	Grey's Anatomy	Kathleen Shepherd	Episode: "Good Shepherd"
2020	God Friended Me	Tammy	Episode: "Almost Famous"
2021	All Rise	Georgia Knight	Episodes: "Georgia", "Leap of Faith"
2021	Crashing Through the Snow	Maggie	Television film (Hallmark)
2022	9-1-1: Lone Star	Catherine	6 episodes (season 3)
2023	The Watchful Eye	Tory	Main role
2025	Chicago Med	Heather Williams	Episode: "The Book of Archer"

=== Web ===
Year	Title	Role	Notes
2008	Who Cut the Cake?	Ellen	3 episodes
2013	Husbands	Claudia	"I Do Over" installment
2015–2017	Con Man	Dawn Jones	8 episodes

== Awards and nominations ==
Year	Association	Category	Work	Result	Refs
2001	Saturn Awards	Cinescape Genre Face of the Future Award - Female	Angel	Nominated	
2002	Saturn Awards	Best Supporting Actress on Television	Angel	Nominated	
2003	Saturn Awards	Best Supporting Actress on Television	Angel	Won	
2004	Satellite Awards	Best Supporting Actress - Drama Series	Angel	Nominated	
2004	Saturn Awards	Best Supporting Actress on Television	Angel	Nominated	
2014	Indie Series Awards	Best Guest Star – Comedy	Husbands	Won	
