= List of Wishbone episodes =

TV series episodes' list

This is a list of episodes of Wishbone, which first aired on PBS Kids from October 8, 1995, to December 7, 1997.

== Series overview ==
Season	Episodes	Originally released	
Season	Episodes	First released	Last released
1	40	October 8, 1995	December 1, 1995
2	10	October 15, 1997	December 7, 1997
TV movie		March 13, 1998	

== Episodes ==
=== Season 1 (1995) ===
No. overall	No. in season	Title	Inspired by	Wishbone's role(s)	Original release date	Prod. code
1	1	"A Tail in Twain"	The Adventures of Tom Sawyer	Tom Sawyer	October 8, 1995	129
2	2	"A Tail in Twain"	The Adventures of Tom Sawyer	Tom Sawyer	October 8, 1995	130
On the final weekend of summer vacation, Joe Talbot is bored and looking for one last adventure. Along with his friends Sam and David, he decides to explore a deep, uncharted section of Jackson Park to find a local urban legend: the "No Name Grave," which is rumored to be haunted. When the kids and Wishbone arrive at the site, they are shocked to discover a mysterious man actively digging up the grave with a shovel. The man spots them spying, threatens them with the shovel, and chases them out of the park. That evening, Joe tells his mother, Ellen, about the disturbing encounter. The next day, the kids — along with Ellen, their neighbor Wanda Gilmore, and Wishbone — return to the gravesite. They're disturbed to find the site dug up and a large wooden box lying open on the ground. The mysterious man from the day before reappears, warning them all to stay away. After a tense moment, he reveals that long ago, in the 1840s, immigrants had briefly lived in the area, hoping in vain to farm it. He says that before they moved on, they buried some of their valuables there, disguising the site as a grave to deter others from disturbing it. After showing the box's contents to the group, he introduces himself as Simon Laszlow, adding that the immigrants were, in fact, his ancestors. His story greatly moves the others, and finally resolves the mystery behind the "No-Name Grave". Wanda, as a member of the Oakdale Historical Society, asks him to contribute his story to the society's record of the town's past. And Ellen invites him to the upcoming annual neighborhood picnic. Note: "A Tail in Twain" aired as a one-hour premiere episode on Sunday, October 8, 1995. The episode was split into two parts and re-aired over the following two days, Monday, October 9, and Tuesday, October 10. Book tie-ins: Wishbone Classics #11: The Adventures of Tom Sawyer.
3	3	"Twisted Tail"	Oliver Twist	Oliver Twist	October 11, 1995	101
A wave of burglaries hits the neighborhood, and the authorities suspect juvenile offenders are behind the crimes. Joe, Sam, and David befriend Max, an orphan new to Oakdale who is living in a local group home. Max starts hanging out at Joe's house, and the two get along well. However, Max is being manipulated by Zach, a rowdy older teenager who uses the boy's vulnerability to drag him into his neighborhood crime wave. After the Talbots' home is burglarized, Joe initially fears Max might be responsible. Ultimately, Max tells the kids where Zach hides his stolen goods, allowing Joe, Sam, and David to notify the police, who arrest Zach. Book tie-ins: Wishbone Classics #5: Oliver Twist.
4	4	"Rosie, Oh! Rosie, Oh!"	Romeo and Juliet	Romeo Montague	October 12, 1995	102
Wishbone accidentally ends up at the dog pound after escaping from the house without his collar. While confined, he becomes instantly smitten with Rosie, a beautiful beagle being held in an adjacent cage. When Joe arrives to rescue him, Wishbone is forced to leave his new love behind. Desperate to reunite with Rosie, Wishbone intentionally slips out of his collar the next day and gets picked up by animal control again. Meanwhile, Sam also falls in love with Rosie and begs her father for permission to adopt her, but he initially denies the request. Undeterred, Sam gains temporary custody of Rosie to show her father the dog in person. She picks up both dogs from the pound, but they quickly escape her yard to romp together. To impress Rosie, Wishbone leads Rosie to Wanda's property, prompting a disgruntled Wanda to call animal control. Consequently, Rosie is taken away again, but she is ultimately adopted by a loving family, leaving Wishbone heartbroken, but happy she is safe. Book tie-ins: Wishbone Classics #3: Romeo and Juliet.
5	5	"Homer Sweet Homer"	The Odyssey	Odysseus	October 13, 1995	105
At the park, Emily, David's younger sister, temporarily captures Wishbone in a dog cage, pulling him around in a wagon and declaring they will live together forever by the park's historic oak tree. After Joe, Sam, and David step in to free Wishbone, the situation takes a serious turn when a Mr. King of the Suitor Development Corporation arrives with a surveying team. Mr. King reveals plans to clear the area and build a brand-new shopping center, which will destroy the historic oak tree, which is nearly 200 years old, and much of the woods around it. Later, Ellen informs the children that Mr. King's project is completely legal — it's been approved by the city, and a local tree preservation law does not go into effect until the following month. Incensed by the news, Wanda shares with the kids and Ellen an article she wrote for the Oakdale Arbor Society about the oak tree's significance. Refusing to back down, they all decide to launch a grassroots campaign. They gather community signatures on a petition, set up a peaceful protest at the site, and successfully stall the construction crews long enough to save the historic oak tree. Further, the city council officially expands Jackson Park to include the oak tree and woods around it, protecting the entire area from development. First appearance of Mr. King and the Suitor Development Corporation. Book tie-ins: Wishbone Classics #2: The Odyssey, The Adventures of Wishbone #13: Homer Sweet Homer.
6	6	"Bark that Bark"	"Anansi the Spider" and "The People Could Fly"	Anansi, Wana	October 16, 1995	106
The kids work together to organize a traditional African storytelling show at the Oakdale Historical Society, to raise money for renovations to its building. David and Emily's maternal uncle, Homer Vincent (played by Akin Babatunde), serves as the guest storyteller, prepared to narrate verbal African folk tales. Overly eager to ensure the event is a success, David stubbornly takes on too many technical responsibilities and flatly refuses offers of help from his family and friends. Despite warnings from Emily, David insists he knows what he is doing. His stubbornness backfires when he overloads the electrical system, causing a major short circuit that knocks out the theater's power and damages its wiring — just hours before the show. (Ironically, one goal of the fundraiser was to replace the building's outdated wiring.) Devastated and consumed by guilt, David isolates and refuses to eat. However, after his friends step in to enable the show to go on, David learns the valuable lesson that true strength and wisdom come from knowing when to let others help.
7	7	"Cyranose"	Cyrano de Bergerac	Cyrano de Bergerac	October 17, 1995	104
Mr. Pruitt gives the students in his English class an assignment to write and recite an original poem. While Joe and Sam easily craft poems about basketball and family, David Barnes — who is more comfortable with science and logic — finds himself completely blocked when it comes to creative writing. While feeling desperate and frustrated, David discovers a beautifully written anonymous poem on his porch. He copies it, achieving widespread praise when he recites it to the class. However, when Mr. Pruitt announces he wants to publish it in the school paper, David is left guilt-ridden about the poem he has plagiarized — and unable to explain the advanced vocabulary in it. The next day, David confesses the truth to Mr. Pruitt. The teacher accepts his honesty but tasks him with writing a genuine poem of his own and determining the true author of the other poem. Eventually, David discovers it was their eccentric neighbor Wanda Gilmore who penned the piece. He introduces Wanda to Mr. Pruitt, and the two bond over a shared love of poetry. Meanwhile, Wanda gives Ellen a statue of Wishbone she has created, representing him as a hideous, fiercely aggressive creature — which prompts Wishbone to reflect on his public image.
8	8	"The Slobbery Hound"	The Hound of the Baskervilles	Sherlock Holmes	October 18, 1995	103
During a stormy night in Oakdale, Wishbone wanders into a suburban alleyway and discovers a massive mess of overturned trash. A neighbor, Mr. Robbins, catches him at the scene and assumes the Jack Russell Terrier is the culprit, angrily chasing him away. Wishbone runs to Mrs. Hernandez's house, only to find spilled paint smeared all over her veranda, alongside fresh animal paw prints. Before Wishbone can conclude his investigation, Mrs. Hernandez catches him, assuming that he caused the destruction. The next morning, the neighborhood is in an uproar over a series of messy disruptions. Because of his notorious digging habits, almost everyone on Forest Avenue immediately blames Wishbone. Neighbors flood the Talbots' phone line with complaints, and a furious Wanda Gilmore confronts Ellen in person, handing her a warning tag she retrieved from the Talbots' front door and threatening that if Wishbone is spotted loose again, animal control will be called. Despite Joe's protests, Wishbone is put on restriction, tied up in the front yard for the neighbors' peace of mind. Determined to clear his dog's name, Joe teams up with Sam and David to launch a full investigation. Armed with tech and logic, they gather evidence from the damage sites, including details of animal paw prints and bite marks. The clues the kids gather lead them to one suspect: an escaped, mischievous bloodhound. Wishbone, no longer tied up, uses his keen sense of smell to track down the large dog, catching the offender in the act. With the real culprit caught, Wishbone's innocence is proven and the neighborhood returns to normal. (This marks the first of two occasions when Wishbone imagines himself as Sherlock Holmes.)
9	9	"Digging Up the Past"	Rip Van Winkle	Rip Van Winkle	October 19, 1995	109
A successful, elderly woman named Dr. Thelma Brown returns to her hometown of Oakdale for the first time in decades. After visiting the library, she stops by Talbots' house, revealing to Joe and Ellen that it was, in fact, her childhood home. She explains that before her family moved away over forty years earlier, she buried a time capsule filled with sentimental childhood treasures somewhere on the property. Joe, Sam, and David eagerly offer to help her find it. However, the search proves difficult because the landscape of the area has changed dramatically over the years: old landmarks are gone, and property lines have shifted. After several failed attempts locate the buried container, Wishbone finally joins the hunt. Using his acute senses and innate digging skills, he successfully tracks down and digs up the long-lost time capsule, reuniting Dr. Brown with her precious childhood memories. Book tie-ins: The Adventures of Wishbone #6: Digging Up the Past.
10	10	"Bone of Arc"	Personal Recollections of Joan of Arc	Louis de Conte	October 20, 1995	112
The Oakdale boys' soccer team is preparing to face off against an incredibly tough, seemingly unbeatable rival team for the local championship. Disaster strikes when one of their star players, Jeff Kelly, severely sprains his knee during practice, leaving the team short-handed and facing certain defeat. Knowing she is an exceptional soccer player, Sam tells Joe and David that she would be willing to play on the team as a replacement. Together, the three approach the team's coach with her offer. Still relatively new to his position, Coach Barnes is initially unsure if a roster change so late in the season is even permitted, but a check of league rules suggests it can be done. After viewing Sam's impressive soccer skills during a practice session, he notifies the league of the change. On game day, Sam turns in a stellar performance, scoring a goal and a penalty kick to rally the team to apparent victory. However, the opposing team's coach files a complaint with the league, claiming that Coach Barnes failed to file his roster change at least 48 hours before the game, as league rules require. In a meeting with a league official, each coach presents his case, as does Sam. In the end, however, the official rules in favor of the opposing team, awarding them the victory — and championship. However, the official makes a point of inviting Sam to play in the boys' soccer league next season. Although disappointed at not winning the championship, Coach Barnes and his team remain upbeat, agreeing that their performance in the game is worthy of celebration. Book tie-ins: Wishbone Classics #4: Joan of Arc.
11	11	"The Impawssible Dream"	Don Quixote	Sancho Panza	October 23, 1995	108
Joe Talbot becomes obsessed with cementing his name in history. In particular, he hopes to break the record in the Encyclopedia of World Records for the most basketball free throws successfully made by a child within five minutes. The current record stands at 85. Joe's intense practice sessions generate enthusiastic neighborhood attention, causing his rival, Damont Jones, to become fiercely jealous. Intent on stealing Joe's spotlight, Damont sets out to beat the record himself. Under the supervision of their school's basketball coach and an official record representative, both boys take turns attempting the feat. Damont goes first, delivering an impressive performance — 80 free throws within the five-minute limit. When it's Joe's turn, he shoots valiantly, ultimately finishing with 81 free throws. Though Joe bests his rival, both boys fall short of breaking the official world record. Despite the outcome, Joe learns from his friends and family that pursuing a grand dream with passion and outperforming your previous achievements is a huge victory in its own right. Book tie-ins: Wishbone Classics #1: Don Quixote.
12	12	"Fleabitten Bargain"	Faust	Faust	October 24, 1995	107
As a favor to Wanda, Joe Talbot volunteers to help her sell her hand-made goods at a local crafts fair, taking Wishbone along as well. At the fair, Joe is distracted by a demonstration at an adjacent booth of a high-tech virtual reality helmet. Wanda says she finds the man selling the device, Dr. Montana, to be shady and disreputable, adding that his machine is completely inappropriate to sell at a crafts fair. As the busy day progresses, Dr. Montana and Joe exchange some friendly words, and Joe seems very interested in the device. The salesman, in turn, seems very interested in Wishbone, coldly seeing the dog as a means to draw more people to his booth — and drive sales of his helmet. As the fair draws to a close, Dr. Montana lets Joe try out the device, and Joe is soon mesmerized by it. Blinded by the allure of the futuristic technology, Joe is eager to acquire the expensive helmet, even though it's well beyond what he can afford. Later that day, Dr. Montana, eager to close the deal, visits the Talbot home, where he meets Joe and Ellen. After greetings are exchanged, Joe is astonished when the salesman offers to give him the helmet for free; all he wants in return is ownership of Wishbone. Hearing this offer, a stunned Joe sees with new clarity the nature of Dr. Montana's deal and, in an instant, firmly rejects it. He realizes that he and his loyal dog share a bond that is utterly priceless, and that the device he once desired so much now seems far less important. In going through the experience, Joe learns a valuable lesson about temptation and what truly matters.
13	13	"Sniffing the Gauntlet"	Ivanhoe	Ivanhoe	October 25, 1995	111
Mr. Pruitt, the English teacher, arranges a competitive, in-class spelling bee spanning two days. After the class is divided into two teams, the competition quickly turns into a fierce showdown between Sam and her smug academic rival, Amanda, on opposing sides. Many competitors, including Joe, are eliminated during the first session, leaving just two students on each team to vie in the final round, with Sam and David representing one side. During a spelling cram session after school, David generously offers Joe and Sam protein snack bars. Unfortunately, the bars contain coconut, a severe allergen for Sam. The next day, Sam, still suffering an intense allergic reaction, is forced to stay home to recover. At school, Amanda shamelessly gloats over Sam's absence, leaving a deeply worried David to face the rival team on his own, without his team's star speller. However, with encouragement from Joe, David steps up to the challenge. After Amanda's only remaining teammate is eliminated, David and Amanda are left to compete against each other in a tense final round. After David correctly spells "perpendicular", Amanda stumbles, misspelling "miscellaneous". David then steps up and spells the word correctly, winning the spelling bee for his team. Afterward, Joe, David and Wishbone visit a recovering Sam to celebrate their team's hard-fought victory. Book tie-ins: Wishbone Classics #12: Ivanhoe, The Adventures of Wishbone #20: Ivanhound.
14	14	"The Hunchdog of Notre Dame"	The Hunchback of Notre-Dame	Quasimodo	October 26, 1995	115
After a practice session of roller hockey, the neighborhood kids, including Joe, David and Sam, decide to play a pick-up game. But when choosing up sides, neighborhood bully Damont Jones refuses to pick the last kid available, Nathaniel Bobelesky, saying he'd rather play on a team one player short. Nathaniel, new to the area and socially awkward, is notoriously uncoordinated on roller skates. However, other kids disagree with Damant, saying that not letting him play is unfair. Sam expresses the opinion particularly strongly, even volunteering to let Nathaniel play in her place. Later on, Damont cruelly demonstrates to all Nathaniel's weakness on skates, further humiliating him. But Sam reaches out, offering to help Nathaniel improve his skating. Over the following days the two meet to train, but Nathaniel shows little improvement. Then during a rest break at her home, Sam shows Nathaniel a fragile glass figurine given to her. In a freak accident, the figurine is knocked out of Sam's hand. But to her amazement, Nathaniel rescues it with a remarkable diving catch, narrowly preventing it from shattering on the floor. Sam is relieved that her precious figurine is saved and, recognizing the hidden potential of Nathaniel's quick reflexes, decides to redirect his roller-hockey training toward defense. She soon convinces a deeply reluctant and insecure Nathaniel to join her team as goaltender. During the next game, Damont and his team relentlessly mock Nathaniel for his poor skating. However, playing as goalie, Nathaniel channels his speedy reflexes to block or catch Damont's fastest shots, stunning the opposition. Nathaniel's spectacular goaltending secures a hard-fought victory for his team, earning him the genuine respect of the entire neighborhood — including a humbled Damont. Book tie-ins: The Adventures of Wishbone #5: The Hunchdog of Notre Dame.
15	15	"Golden Retrieved"	Silas Marner	Silas Marner	October 27, 1995	122
Joe Talbot buys a brand-new mountain bike and quickly becomes obsessed with the machine and with bicycling. As he spends increasingly more time with the bike, he begins taking Wishbone for granted, ignoring his pet's companionship and neglecting his needs. One day while Joe is biking at Jackson Park, Wishbone, who has been left tied up, wriggles out of his collar, wanders off, and gets trapped in a deep trench from which he is unable to escape. The dog is eventually rescued and temporarily adopted by one Hubert Lassiter, a lonely, grieving widower who longs for companionship. Although Hubert wants to return Wishbone to his proper home, the task is complicated as the dog no longer has identifying tags. Meanwhile, when Wishbone fails to return home, a devastated Joe realizes, too late, how much his dog means to him. The next day he distributes "missing dog" flyers throughout the park. There, Joe encounters Hubert, who is also putting up posters. When Joe is reunited with his beloved pet, he promises never to ignore Wishbone again, having learned a valuable lesson about the importance of prioritizing his relationships over mere possessions. But for those occasions when Joe wants to bike the trails, he offers to let Wishbone spend some quality time with Hubert.
16	16	"A Tail of Two Sitters"	A Tale of Two Cities	Charles Darnay	October 30, 1995	117
In Oakdale, David brings his brand-new remote-controlled car over to Joe's house to test out. However, David has also been tasked with babysitting his mischievous younger sister, Emily, and her friend Tina. Eager to play with the toy without interruption, Joe and David decide to take the car outside, leaving the young girls unsupervised inside the Talbots' house. Outside, the boys quickly lose track of time while operating the car. When Wanda, their eccentric neighbor, asks to try the controls, Wishbone begins chasing the vehicle, leading to it crashing and getting damaged. Meanwhile, left to their own devices, Emily and Tina wreak havoc in the Talbots' home, making a mess in the kitchen and stringing the entire living room with toilet paper. When Joe's mother, Ellen, returns from her errands, she discovers the disaster and immediately assumes that Wishbone is the culprit. Feeling guilty, the two young girls eventually confess that they caused the mess. However, Ellen punishes Joe and David for failing to supervise the girls, ordering them to clean up the entire mess — as a relieved Wishbone looks on. Book tie-ins: The Adventures of Wishbone #9: A Tail of Two Sitters.
17	17	"Frankenbone"	Frankenstein	Victor Frankenstein	October 31, 1995	113
Joe Talbot is building a meticulously detailed model dinosaur skeleton for his upcoming school science fair. Meanwhile, David Barnes reveals to Joe that he has been working on a top-secret, highly advanced science project of his own. Although he is coy about sharing any of its details, even with Joe, he later divulges to his little sister, Emily, that it's a fully functioning robot powered by "natural energy". Later that evening, a severe thunderstorm rolls though Oakdale. While Wishbone is in David's garage investigating the machine, a lightning strike nearby unexpectedly activates the robot. It malfunctions and escapes into the night, moving out of control. The next day, David frantically alerts the neighborhood that his project has disappeared, prompting Joe, David, and Wishbone to hunt through the park to find it. They manage to capture the runaway machine and bring it to school just in time for the science fair. However, during the exhibition, the robot again turns on without warning, causing chaos and destroying the presentations of several other students. David is left with a harsh lesson about the critical importance of thoroughly testing his creations before presenting them to the world. Book tie-ins: Wishbone Classics #7: Frankenstein
18	18	"Hot Diggity Dawg"	Journey to the Center of the Earth	Professor Otto Lidenbrock	November 1, 1995	121
Joe, Sam, and David help their eccentric neighbor, Wanda Gilmore, plant a new tree in her yard for Arbor Day. While digging the hole, Wishbone unearths a broken, ancient-looking piece of a metal medal inscribed with Latin text. The kids take the artifact to Joe's mother, Ellen, who translates the inscription and determines that it was a military decoration awarded for outstanding bravery during the American Civil War in 1864. However, the part of the medal containing the honoree's name is missing. Eager to find the other half and solve the mystery of where it came from, the kids head back to the digging site. During the search, Joe accidentally ruptures a buried water sprinkler line, triggering a massive, chaotic geyser. Amidst the spray, a soaked Wishbone emerges from the mud with the backing piece of the artifact in his mouth. When the pieces are reassembled, the full inscription reveals the medal belonged to Colonel Noah Johnstone, a Civil War hero and the original founder and first mayor of Oakdale. Wanda is thrilled by the discovery and invites the children to present the long-lost artifact at the next meeting of the Oakdale Historical Society. Book tie-ins: Wishbone Classics #9: A Journey to the Center of the Earth, The Adventures of Wishbone #17: Digging to the Center of the Earth.
19	19	"One Thousand and One Tails"	One Thousand and One Nights ("Ali Baba and the Forty Thieves")	Ali Baba, Sinbad the Sailor (cameo), Aladdin (cameo)	November 2, 1995	118
David Barnes receives a brand-new computer and soon stumbles into an online chat room. He notices a group of users communicating suspiciously using encrypted messages. Using his advanced technical skills, he cracks the encryption and quickly deduces that they are cyber criminals and that their messages are part of an orchestrated internet banking scam. He attempts to get engage with them online but, in a moment of confusion, a large amount of money is inadvertently transferred electronically into his father's checking account, which gets the immediate attention of local F.B.I. agents. When they show up at David's home to question his perplexed father, who is unaware of what's happened, David is able to share with the agents the details of his own investigation, helping them to track down the scammers and shut down their criminal operation. Meanwhile, David's younger sister, Emily, finds a lost purse sitting on the ground outdoors and brings it into the house. She discovers the purse contains money, but when she asks David to use it to buy candy for her, David firmly tells her that it's not her money and that the purse must be returned to its rightful owner. Ultimately, they determine the purse belongs to their neighbor Wanda Gilmore, and it is Wishbone who, wanting to helpful, returns it to her. However, in doing so he is unfairly blamed for having taken the purse in the first place.
20	20	"Mixed Breeds"	Strange Case of Dr. Jekyll and Mr. Hyde	Gabriel John Utterson	November 3, 1995	110
Wanda Gilmore shares exciting news with Ellen Talbot: during a talent night at Pepper Pete's Pizzeria, an energetic Elvis Presley impersonator named Lou Dublin singled her out, singing directly to her during his set and tossing her his sunglasses. Smitten by his rock-and-roll persona, Wanda plans to see him perform again. However, this new pursuit is already starting to jeopardize her ongoing relationship with schoolteacher Bob Pruitt, whom she suddenly views as stuffy and boring by comparison. Meanwhile, Joe, Sam, and David experience an uncharacteristically grumpy and disorganized Mr. Pruitt, who arrives late to English class and suddenly schedules a massive poetry exam for the day after the talent show. Determined to study for the test while supporting Wanda, the kids take their textbooks to the pizzeria to watch Lou Dublin's next performance. During his cheesy rendition of the song "Puppy Dog for Your Love", the impersonator's black wig accidentally slips off mid-song, revealing that Lou Dublin is actually a disguised Bob Pruitt. A shocked but relieved Wanda learns from Bob that he adopted the persona to inject passion and excitement into their relationship, fearing his true self was too uninteresting. Reassured, Wanda confesses she loves him exactly the way he is. The next day, a cheerful Mr. Pruitt cancels the dreaded exam, surprising his grateful class with a celebratory pizza party instead. Book tie-ins: Wishbone Classics #8: The Strange Case of Dr. Jekyll and Mr. Hyde, The Adventures of Wishbone #14: Dr. Jekyll and Mr. Dog.
21	21	"The Canine Cure"	The Imaginary Invalid	Molière	November 6, 1995	120
Nathaniel Bobelesky comes to stay overnight at Joe Talbot's house while his parents have their home repainted. Nathaniel arrives with an extensive list of food and environmental allergies — along with a separate list of medicines to treat them — firmly believing himself to be fragile and sickly. Later, his overprotective mother, Belinda, drops off an additional list, a vitamin chart, and is startled to see Wishbone. She quickly adds "dogs" to the allergy list, saying dog dander will trigger sneezing fits in Nathaniel. As if on cue, he starts sneezing. To ensure Nathaniel's health, Ellen decides to keep Wishbone outside during the day, tied up in the front yard, and have him remain in the study during the night. Joe and his friends later reflect that Nathaniel had played happily with Wishbone all afternoon without any allergy issues until his mother arrived. They agree that Nathaniel's dog allergy may be psychosomatic, existing only in his head. That night, feeling personally motivated to prove this point, Wishbone escapes from the study, sneaks into Joe's bedroom and curls up right next to a sleeping Nathaniel. The next morning, Nathaniel wakes up feeling perfectly healthy, only to hear Wishbone, mere inches away, sneeze. Realizing he spent an entire symptom-free night next to a dog, Nathaniel gains a boost of confidence, and happily crosses off "dogs" from his allergy list.
22	22	"The Pawloined Paper"	"The Purloined Letter"	C. Auguste Dupin	November 7, 1995	114
Joe Talbot develops a schoolboy crush on his radiantly smiling history teacher, Miss Gretchen Malloy. Before class one day, Miss Malloy draws for Joe a map to help him better understand the strategies of the Battle of Waterloo. During class, Joe creates a secret word puzzle/acrostic list on the back of the map, detailing all the things he admires about her, using words like "awesome", "beautiful", and "excellent". The class bully, Curtis, snatches the paper out of Joe's hands, seeking to torment him. When Miss Malloy intervenes, she confiscates the paper and, without reading it, sets it on her desk. Curtis later threatens to sneak back into the classroom, find the paper and post it publicly outside the school, completely humiliating Joe. Panicked, Joe hunts everywhere for the sheet after school but cannot find it. Later, trying a more logical approach, Joe remembers that Miss Malloy always uses both sides of a sheet to save paper. With this in mind, Joe returns to the school, this time with Wishbone. There, on a sheet plainly visible posted on the classroom wall, he discovers his love note — on the official daily homework assignment sheet. Fortunately, though, his note is hidden from view, on the side opposite the facing page. Using an enthusiastic Wishbone to create a diversion, Joe replaces the posted sheet with another on which he has carefully traced the assignment. Though Joe thinks he's gotten away undetected, Miss Malloy playfully reveals later that she did spot his list, teasingly telling him, "I'm glad you think I'm cool, but 'excellent' is spelled with two 'l's." Book tie-ins: The Adventures of Wishbone #11: The Pawloined Paper.
23	23	"Bark to the Future"	The Time Machine	The Time Traveler	November 8, 1995	119
Joe Talbot brings home a poor grade on his latest math test. His mother, Ellen, issues a strict ultimatum: if Joe does not raise his math grade significantly this term, he will not be allowed to participate in the upcoming tryouts for the basketball team. Feeling overwhelmed, Joe vents to David, who generously lends him a calculator to make the math homework easier. However, Joe doesn't appreciate that the device is only a tool, that calculating numbers is very different from actually solving math problems. Overconfident, he entirely skips studying for the next big test. His plan backfires dramatically when Wishbone hides the calculator, leaving Joe empty-handed to face a test that, unexpectedly, consists entirely of word problems (i.e., where even having a calculator may not be enough to find the solution). Joe bombs on the test, getting an even lower score than his previous one. To help him earn money for a replacement calculator — and to force him to practice math manually — Ellen arranges for Joe to help out as cashier at Wanda Gilmore's weekend neighborhood yard sale. Joe initially struggles to calculate sales totals and percentage discounts without a machine. But with patient guidance from Wanda, Joe learns how to use his own critical-thinking skills to calculate numbers. Empowered by this real-world tutorial, Joe passes his final math exam with flying colors, raising his math grade enough to qualify for the basketball tryouts.
24	24	"Paw Prints of Thieves"	The Merry Adventures of Robin Hood	Robin Hood	November 9, 1995	123
Joe Talbot, accompanied by Wishbone, comes upon Ellie, a kind-hearted cafeteria worker at his school, who is loading leftover food from the cafeteria into her car. As she explains, the food is to go to the local food bank to feed people in need. It's no longer fresh enough to serve at school, but is otherwise quite safe to eat. She admits, however, that what she is doing goes against the school's strict regulations, which require such food to be thrown out. That policy came from Mr. Bison, the school's officious, power-hungry food-service manager, who claims that running a donation program would require too much effort. Joe is shocked at hearing about so much food needlessly going to waste, and insists on helping Ellie — even after Mr. Bison catches them loading her car and angrily orders Ellie to throw the food into the dumpster. Wishbone manages to distract Mr. Bison, and Ellie and Joe drive off and successfully deliver the leftover food to the food bank. Their victory is brief, however, as Mr. Bison fires Ellie for violating his direct orders. Deeply offended, Joe courageously takes a stand in support of Ellie and against Mr. Bison's policy. He rallies his friends and classmates and launches a student-led protest against the school's wasteful policy, getting the attention of Principal Leonard. The peaceful protest successfully forces the school board to change its stance, legalizing the food program, and giving Ellie, who is re-hired, the freedom to donate school leftovers to the food bank. Book tie-ins: Wishbone Classics #6: The Adventures of Robin Hood.
25	25	"Furst Impressions"	Pride and Prejudice	Mr. Darcy	November 10, 1995	116
The upcoming Oakdale school beach party social has the neighborhood kids in a complete frenzy as everyone scrambles to find a date. The anxiety spikes when the neighborhood bully, Damont Jones, pressures Joe, Sam, and David into believing that they will not be considered cool unless they bring a date to the event. The high-stress social situation peaks when a series of petty misunderstandings and circulating rumors trigger a massive fight between best friends Sam Kepler and David Barnes, threatening to ruin the event for the entire group. The tension escalates when David accuses Joe of choosing Sam's side in the argument. At the dance, Joe finds himself unable to enjoy the party due to the rift between his best friends. Refusing to let the group fall apart, Joe brings Sam and David together to confront the situation, prompting everyone to apologize and reconcile. The group later discovers that Damont was the one secretly orchestrating the false rumors to stir up drama. With their friendship restored, the kids successfully expose Damont's scheme and enjoy the rest of the beach party together.
26	26	"The Prince and the Pooch"	The Prince and the Pauper	Tom Canty, Edward VI	November 13, 1995	126
Believing he would be just as good at coaching as he is at playing, Joe Talbot tries to coach a girls' tee-ball team called the Tigers, which includes Emily Barnes and her friend Tina. The naive 5-year-olds are easily confused, heavily distracted, and much more interested in playing with Wishbone than paying attention to the game. During the final game of the season, Joe's coaching strategies completely fail. The Tigers make numerous errors, causing an overbearing parent, Mr. King, to aggressively complain about Joe's capabilities. When everything looks grim, Wishbone steps in to help. Knowing the starry-eyed youngsters are completely smitten with him, the playful canine gets them to chase him around the diamond by offering the reward of petting him at each base. This chaotic but effective strategy keeps the girls running in the right direction, allowing the Tigers to score runs and ultimately win the game by one point. Joe learns that effective leadership requires understanding and adapting to the unique strengths and motivations of your team. Book tie-ins: The Adventures of Wishbone #3: The Prince and the Pooch.
27	27	"The Count's Account"	The Count of Monte Cristo	Edmond Dantès	November 14, 1995	127
David Barnes invents a motorized wagon, but neighborhood bully Damont Jones takes it for an unauthorized joyride and destroys Wanda Gilmore's prize garden. Because it is David's invention, Wanda and David's parents falsely accuse and severely punish him for the wreckage. Embittered by the injustice and desperate to clear his name, David decides to take matters into his own hands rather than waiting for the truth to come out. He teams up with Joe and Sam to orchestrate an elaborate, secret revenge plot against Damont. The kids set a trap by constructing a trick ramp that causes Damont to publicly crash during his next reckless ride, exposing him as the true culprit. While Damont is finally caught and punished, David realizes that obsessing over vengeance nearly consumed him, learning that pursuing absolute revenge can often cause more harm than good.
28	28	"Salty Dog"	Treasure Island	Jim Hawkins	November 15, 1995	124
Wanda Gilmore takes Ellen, Joe, Sam, and David on a bike ride to Jackson Park to view a historic local landmark—the condemned Trumbull Barn—just days before it is scheduled for demolition. While there, Wanda shares an urban legend about a legendary local horse named Blackbeard. She explains that after the horse passed away, the original owner nailed "Blackbeard's Horseshoe" deep inside the structure. According to local myth, anyone who possesses the horseshoe will be granted the absolute courage to face any danger. Driven by a thirst for adventure, Sam secures Wanda's local map and convinces a highly reluctant Joe and David to sneak past the "No Trespassing" signs the following day to hunt for the artifact. Wishbone tags along to keep them safe. Disaster strikes when the heavy, weathered barn door accidentally slams shut behind them, leaving the children trapped inside.As Sam climbs toward the roof looking for an escape route, a severe autumn thunderstorm rolls in, and a sudden bolt of lightning strikes the old barn, setting it ablaze. Keeping her cool, Sam tells the boys not to panic. Wishbone locates a small opening near the foundation, squeezes out, and races back to Forest Avenue to alert Ellen. Back inside the smoking structure, Sam successfully guides Joe and David through an opening in the roof just as Ellen, Wanda, and Sam's father, Walter, arrive at the scene. In the chaos of the escape, Sam also manages to recover the legendary horseshoe. Later, Walter expresses deep disappointment that his daughter risked her life and the lives of her friends, but he is equally impressed by her immense bravery under pressure. Recognizing her courage, Wanda reveals that the Oakdale Historical Society has voted to let Sam keep Blackbeard's Horseshoe permanently. A humbled Sam proudly accepts the artifact and promises her father to stay away from dangerous stunts. Book tie-ins: The Adventures of Wishbone #2: Salty Dog.
29	29	"Little Big Dog"	David and Goliath	David	November 16, 1995	132
When Ellen and Joe Talbot travel to Vancouver for a short trip, Wishbone is dropped off to stay at David and Emily’s house. Meanwhile, David’s parents purchase a brand-new car, and Mr. Barnes warns David to stay away from it. While playing a game of catch in the driveway, Sam throws a ball that goes wide. David dives to make a spectacular catch but accidentally crashes into the vehicle, snapping the side-view mirror completely off its mount. Panicked and terrified of his father's reaction, David convinces Sam to help him hide the damage by using a piece of chewing gum to temporarily stick the broken mirror back onto the car's frame. The next morning, Mr. Barnes goes outside to adjust the mirror before work, causing it to fall completely off and shatter on the driveway. Unaware of the boys' antics, Mr. Barnes assumes the car arrived with a severe mechanical defect and angrily prepares to launch a costly lawsuit against the automotive manufacturer. Overcome with intense guilt as the lie spins out of control, David confides in his younger sister, Emily. She uses logic to convince her brother that an innocent company shouldn't take the blame for his mistake, urging him to come clean. David musters up his courage, confesses the truth to his father, and offers to use his own allowance money to pay for the repairs. Mr. Barnes cancels the lawsuit and forgives David, praising him for his honesty. Note: A segment of this episode is featured in the video, Kids For Character: Choices Count.
30	30	"A Dogged Exposé"	"A Scandal in Bohemia"	Sherlock Holmes	November 17, 1995	135
At school, an anonymous prankster secretly photographs Sam Kepler in an unflattering, clumsy moment and distributes embarrassing flyers of her across the hallways. The only clue left behind is a scrambled pen name signed at the top of the page. By rearranging the letters of the anagram, Joe, David, and Sam deduce that the culprit must be Sam’s fierce academic rival, Amanda Hollings. However, when they angrily confront Amanda, they are shocked to discover that she has also been targeted with equally embarrassing flyers around the school. Joining forces to solve the mystery, the group realizes the entire scenario was a malicious trick engineered by neighborhood bully Damont Jones. He had created the fake anagram to intentionally turn the kids against each other and deflect suspicion. With the truth uncovered, the students report Damont to the school administration, exposing his scheme and clearing Amanda's name.
31	31	"A Terrified Terrier"	The Red Badge of Courage	Henry Fleming	November 20, 1995	128
Joe Talbot gets invited to hang out with a group of older, more popular kids in the neighborhood, led by a charismatic but superficial teenager. Eager to fit in and maintain his elevated social status, Joe begins actively neglecting David, Sam, and Wishbone. He even starts imitating the popular kids' arrogant, dismissive, and snobbish behavior, completely blind to the fact that his cold actions are deeply hurting his lifelong companions.When the older kids peer-pressure Joe into participating in a risky, mean-spirited prank that targets one of his old friends, Joe experiences a sharp reality check. Witnessing how easily his new "friends" turn on people, Joe snaps out of his trance. He flatly refuses to go through with the prank and walks away from the group. Realizing how terribly he has treated his real inner circle, a remorseful Joe delivers a heartfelt apology to David, Sam, and Wishbone, learning that true loyalty and friendship are far more valuable than temporary popularity.. Book tie-ins: Wishbone Classics #10: The Red Badge of Courage.
32	32	"Shakespaw"	The Tempest	Ariel	November 21, 1995	133
The school drama club is putting on a stage production of William Shakespeare's The Tempest. David Barnes takes on the highly stressful role of director, while Joe acts as the stage manager, and Sam is cast as the lead heroine, Miranda. Trouble arises during the chaotic dress rehearsal when neighborhood bullies Damont Jones and Curtis abuse their crew jobs running the water effects, repeatedly spraying the cast with water. Worse, classmate Amanda Hollings—who has been cast as the magical sprite Ariel—becomes deeply frustrated with her silly-looking costume and the fact that she did not get to play Miranda. Out of envy and spite, Amanda suddenly quits the production right before opening night, leaving David without a replacement. Stepping in to save the show, their eccentric neighbor Wanda Gilmore volunteers to take over the role of Ariel. Though significantly older than the student cast, Wanda brings immense passion to the part, helping the kids pull off a highly successful opening night performance. David receives praise for his directing, and the group learns the value of perseverance through theatrical chaos
33	33	"Muttketeer!"	The Three Musketeers	D'Artagnan	November 22, 1995	125
Wishbone is struck with a sudden wave of loneliness and decides to sneak out of the house to follow Joe, David, and Sam to school, determined to join them in class. After successfully infiltrating Sequoyah Middle School, Wishbone must continuously dodge the strict school principal and the hall monitors to avoid being kicked out.While hiding in the building's underbelly, he discovers a major crisis: a rogue, destructive rat named Mort is chewing through the school's structural wiring. Teaming up with the school's eccentric janitor, Wishbone uses his wits to track down and corner the problematic rodent, saving the school's electrical system from a massive failure. Book tie-ins: The Adventures of Wishbone #8: Muttketeer!.
34	34	"Hercules Unleashed"	Hercules and the Golden Apples	Hercules	November 23, 1995	131
Sam Kepler struggles to find the perfect present for her father Walter's upcoming 40th birthday party. Her search looks entirely hopeless until her father offhandedly mentions a beloved, sentimental photograph of himself and Joe's late father taken during a fishing trip in Montana that has been missing for years. Determined to recover the photo, Sam learns it might be buried deep within the old athletic archives at Oakdale College. She visits the campus office, where the secretary agrees to search the archives on one condition: Sam must responsibly manage the busy front desk and answer the phones. Sam quickly becomes completely overwhelmed by the chaotic barrage of incoming phone calls, mismanaging messages and causing total office confusion before the secretary returns with the recovered photograph.
35	35	"¡Viva Wishbone!"	Our Lady of Guadalupe	Juan Diego	November 24, 1995	134
With Mother's Day approaching, Joe Talbot begins feeling intensely jealous when his mother, Ellen, spends her free time comforting and befriending Michael Dunn (Jensen Ackles), a lonely young man who recently lost his own mother. Seeking reassurance, Joe gets a welcome distraction when Señora Julia, a beloved old family friend who acted as his childhood caretaker, returns to Oakdale for a visit. Wanting to outshine Michael and prove his deep devotion to Ellen, Joe decides to use his entire life savings to buy an expensive, beautifully crafted music box that his mother had previously admired. Señora Julia is alarmed by the steep price tag and gently attempts to dissuade him, but Joe stubbornly insists on the purchase. Disaster strikes as soon as Joe brings the gift home. He accidentally drops the music box onto the floor, breaking its internal mechanism and rendering it completely silent. Panicked, Joe and Señora Julia return to the antique store to ask for a refund or a replacement, but the strict store owner flatly refuses, citing an unyielding final sale store policy. Devastated and convinced his Mother's Day surprise is completely ruined, Joe breaks down. Señora Julia comforts him and uses a historic Mexican tale to teach him a valuable lesson about the unconditional nature of a mother's love. Empowered by the story, Joe courageously gives Ellen the broken music box anyway. Ellen is deeply moved by his sacrifice and reassures Joe that a material gift could never change how much she loves him.
36	36	"The Entrepawneur"	Metamorphoses	King Midas	November 27, 1995	136
Joe Talbot decides to launch a neighborhood grocery delivery service over the summer called "Talbot Delivery" to earn extra spending money. As the orders pour in, he quickly realizes the workload is too heavy to handle alone and recruits his best friends, David and Sam, to work for him. However, instead of running the operation as a fair partnership, Joe tries to manage the business strictly by the book. The stress of leadership quickly gets to his head, and he becomes an incredibly bossy, dictatorial, and overbearing boss.Joe forces his friends to wear mismatched, used T-shirts as uniforms and tries to reward their exhaustion with cheap "certificates of appreciation" instead of actual monetary bonuses. David and Sam attempt to stay patient out of friendship, but the breaking point occurs when an on-the-job bicycle mishap causes a batch of groceries to spill. Joe coldly barks orders at them and treats them like low-ranking servants rather than equal partners. Feeling completely unappreciated and exploited, David and Sam rebel against his authority and walk out on the business. Left completely on his own, a stubborn Joe attempts to manage the massive influx of deliveries entirely by himself, only to quickly collapse from total physical exhaustion. Realizing that his single-minded obsession with profit and power nearly cost him his closest relationships, a humbled Joe dissolves the business, delivers a sincere apology to David and Sam, and learns that friendship is far more valuable than wealth Book tie-ins: Wishbone Adventures #1: Curse of Gold.
37	37	"Pantin' at the Opera"	The Phantom of the Opera	Viscount Raoul de Chagny	November 28, 1995	137
Real-World Plot:The kids visit the Oakdale public library to research a music report when they notice reference books mysteriously vanishing from the shelves. While investigating the strange disappearances, Joe, David, and Sam spot a strange, shadowy figure lurking in the dark library basement—who turns out to be Ezra Knutsen, the eccentric former reference librarian. The discovery deeply shocks Ellen, as Ezra's wife had recently mailed an official letter to the library stating that Ezra had passed away. Things are definitely not as they seem; the "ghostly" librarian is actually alive, well, and hiding out in the building's underbelly to protect his beloved collection. To unravel the mystery, a library security guard joins the Talbots and Wanda Gilmore to unearth the truth, ultimately helping Ezra reconcile with the modern library administration.
38	38	"Dances with Dogs"	The Story of the Deathless Voice	A young brave	November 29, 1995	138
Wanda Gilmore and Ellen Talbot busy themselves organizing the 5th annual Lee Natonabah cultural event at the Oakdale Public Library. Lee Natonabah (played by Apache-Mexican American actor Adan Sanchez) returns to town to celebrate Native American culture, history, and the art of oral storytelling. Inspired by the celebration, a Native American friend of Joe's speaks to the local children about Navajo traditions, the central importance of family heritage, and how personal stories connect generations. Joe and David eagerly volunteer to write and perform their own family stories at the upcoming library showcase. However, the assignment quickly plunges Joe into an intense emotional struggle. As he tries to write, Joe begins feeling deeply inadequate under the shadow of his late father's legacy, worrying that his own life and personal achievements are too insignificant to make his family proud. Sensing his distress, Lee Natonabah comforts Joe. Lee uses a poignant traditional story from a Dakota tribe that once lived in Minnesota to teach Joe that true legacy is not defined by massive historical feats, but by the love, integrity, and daily choices of the individual. Empowered by the lesson, Joe confidently takes the stage to share his story, celebrating his family in his own unique voice
39	39	"Rushin' to the Bone"	The Inspector General	Osip	November 30, 1995	139
The kids visit the Oakdale public library to research a music report when they notice reference books mysteriously vanishing from the shelves. While investigating the strange disappearances, Joe, David, and Sam spot a strange, shadowy figure lurking in the dark library basement—who turns out to be Ezra Knutsen, the eccentric former reference librarian. The discovery deeply shocks Ellen, as Ezra's wife had recently mailed an official letter to the library stating that Ezra had passed away. Things are definitely not as they seem; the "ghostly" librarian is actually alive, well, and hiding out in the building's underbelly to protect his beloved collection. To unravel the mystery, a library security guard joins the Talbots and Wanda Gilmore to unearth the truth, ultimately helping Ezra reconcile with the modern library administration. The crew treats Wishbone like an object, and they even hire an arrogant human actor named Larry Brinkley (played in a meta-cameo by Wishbone's real voice actor, Larry Brantley) to dub over Wishbone's voice with a terrible, fake Scottish accent.
40	40	"Picks of the Litter"	various	various	December 1, 1995	140
In the season finale, Wishbone tells some of his favorite stories (with clips from A Tail in Twain, Bark That Bark, The Impawssible Dream, Furst Impressions, Homer Sweet Homer, Sniffing the Gauntlet, Frankenbone, Bone of Arc, and Twisted Tail) to a visiting female dog named Penny, who shocks Wishbone by revealing she has something in common with him at the very end: she, too, can speak.

=== Season 2 (1997) ===
No. overall	No. in season	Title	Inspired by	Wishbone's role	Original release date	Prod. code
41	1	"Halloween Hound: The Legend of Creepy Collars"	The Legend of Sleepy Hollow	Ichabod Crane	October 15, 1997	201
42	2	"Halloween Hound: The Legend of Creepy Collars"	The Legend of Sleepy Hollow	Ichabod Crane	October 15, 1997	202
In the season premiere, Joe accidentally throws a ball near the old Murphy house while playing with Wishbone. Wishbone meets a black cat, but Joe warns him to leave due to its unpleasant appearance. Joe meets Oakdale's Sports and Games store owner, Travis Del Rio (Julio Cedillo), who develops a Halloween-themed scavenger hunt. He also meets Mr. Del Rio's niece, Melina Finch (Mikaila Enriquez), and nephew, Marcus Finch (Paul English, Jr.). Joe participates in the scavenger hunt with Sam and David, while Damont and his cousin, Jimmy (Jarrad Kritzstein) are competing against them. The hunt begins with playing a carnival game that involves shooting simulated wild animals behind Wanda's house. Next, they go to the Dart animal clinic, where Sam plays in the simulated horse racing game. After that, they go over to Jackson Park, where David drops a coin into the orange slot to begin a gadget. It ends with an invitation to a Halloween "tea party" at 13 Thunder Road. Oakdale's first annual Halloween-themed scavenger hunt continues with Joe, David, and Sam at Thunder Road in front of the old Murphy house, along with Jimmy, who tells them Damont went inside before their arrival. Wishbone pursues a black cat, which leads Joe, Sam, and David into the house. It's the same house where Joe saw an eerie disembodied spirit while trick-or-treating with David several years earlier. Damont sneakily closes doors on Joe, Sam, and David. Wishbone closes the door on Damont and the black cat. The hunt ends with Joe finding the gift certificate under a floor downstairs, and Damont quickly exits the house after Joe opens the door that shuttered him, but Joe encounters the eerie eyes, which turn out to be the black cat. After exiting the house, Travis congratulates them for finishing. He announces a Halloween party at his store afterward. Travis tells Joe that the scavenger hunt on Halloween was his lucky day after all. The black cat disappears on Wishbone for the final time. Book tie-ins: Super Adventures of Wishbone #2: The Legend of Sleepy Hollow.
43	3	"The Prince of Wags"	Henry IV, Part 1	Prince Henry (Hal)	October 19, 1997	203
The middle school basketball team must elect a new team captain. Neighborhood bully Damont Jones aggressively campaigns for the position, but the team votes for Joe Talbot instead, infuriating Damont. Joe feels immense pressure and doubts his own ability to be an effective leader. During the game Joe's team falls behind in a high-stakes basketball game. Down by two points with only seconds left on the clock, Joe drives down the court. Instead of taking a risky shot himself to be the individual hero, Joe recognizes that Damont has a better angle. Joe selflessly passes the ball to Damont, who sinks a three-pointer to win the game. Joe proves that true leadership means making the best choice for the team rather than seeking personal glory.
44	4	"Groomed for Greatness"	Great Expectations	Pip	October 26, 1997	204
Eccentric artist, Renee Lassiter (Shelley Duvall) arrives in Oakdale to sculpt a statue of a local dog for the grand opening of a new park. After reviewing several candidates, Renee selects Wishbone to be her model. Wishbone is thrilled by his selection, instantly letting visions of fame, high society, and luxury get to his head. David takes the assignment too seriously and begins neglecting his friends. Meanwhile, Renee turns out to be incredibly snobby, demanding, and irresponsible—racking up massive food bills for others to pay before suddenly abandoning the unfinished project for a job at the Smithsonian. The city dumps her unfinished statue in a landfill, leaving Wishbone disappointed. However, Wanda makes amends by presenting a new dog statue. Wishbone and David both realize that chasing superficial fame and snobbish expectations is hollow, and they learn to appreciate their true friends.
45	5	"A Bone of Contention"	The Courtship of Miles Standish	John Alden	November 2, 1997	205
In Oakdale, the upcoming school dance has everyone looking for dates. Joe Talbot has a massive crush on a classmate named Sarah Johnson (Melissa Archer), but completely lacks the courage to ask her out himself. To solve his dilemma, Joe asks his best friend, David Barnes, to act as his wingman and ask Sarah to the dance on his behalf. However, when David approaches Sarah, the two unexpectedly hit it off over shared interests. Sarah assumes David is asking for himself and enthusiastically agrees to go to the dance with him. When David breaks the news, Joe feels deeply betrayed, causing a massive rift between the two best friends. The tension peaks as the school dance arrives, and Joe refuses to speak to David. However, after reflecting on Wishbone’s parallel historical daydream—where Alden and Standish ultimately reconcile their brotherhood over the misunderstanding—Joe realizes that David never intended to hurt him. Joe swallows his pride and forgives David. At the dance, Wishbone hilariously serves as an honorary "mascot" dance partner, and the boys realize their lifelong friendship is far more important than a petty romantic rivalry
46	6	"War of the Noses"	The Black Arrow	Richard Shelton	November 9, 1997	206
Ellen and Joe Talbot prepare to take Wishbone to the vet for his routine vaccinations, much to the dog's dread. Before they leave, Ellen asks Wanda Gilmore to hand over an old chair to a furniture donation truck. However, Wanda gets confused and accidentally gives away Wishbone's beloved red armchair instead. While waiting in the car at a gas station, a panicked Wishbone spots his chair in the back of the moving furniture truck and escapes the vehicle to chase after it, leaving Joe to frantically search the neighborhood. Joe searches for Wishbone with the help of Damont’s cousin, Jimmy, who continuously lies about having a massive tracking hound that turns out to be a tiny Chihuahua. After finding Wishbone, Joe drags him to the vet, where Wishbone is relieved to find the shot is painless. As they leave the clinic, Wishbone spots the furniture truck parked outside. He leads Joe and Ellen straight to it, exposing the mix-up and successfully saving his red chair from being lost forever.
47	7	"Moonbone"	The Moonstone	Franklin Blake	November 16, 1997	207
In Oakdale, NFL superstar Daryl "Moose" Johnston comes to town to host a youth football clinic, bringing along one of his prized Super Bowl championship rings. Excitement turns to panic when the expensive ring goes missing from the sports field. Because Wishbone has a notorious habit of digging holes around the neighborhood, several townsfolk immediately accuse him of taking and burying the ring. Joe Talbot stands by his pet and sets out to investigate, but even he begins to doubt Wishbone's innocence when incriminating evidence points toward the dog. Joe refuses to give up on his dog and continues to search for the truth. Driven by Wishbone's parallel mystery journey, the kids uncover the real sequence of events. It is revealed that Wishbone did not steal the ring at all; rather, a series of misunderstandings and accidental displacements by humans caused the ring to get lost. Wishbone's innocence is triumphantly proven, the ring is returned to a grateful Daryl Johnston, and Wishbone's reputation as a good dog is completely restored.
48	8	"Barking at Buddha"	Monkey (Journey to the West)	Monkey	November 23, 1997	208
In Oakdale, Wishbone becomes intensely jealous of a local hero dog named Rex and wishes he could perform grand, heroic feats to achieve similar fame. Meanwhile, two younger neighborhood boys, Jimmy and Marcus, desperately want to hang out with Joe and the older kids. Trying to prove they are grown up and capable, the two youngsters set out on a misguided adventure that accidentally puts them in a dangerous situation. Wishbone tracks down the missing younger boys and helps guide them safely back to the older kids. Jimmy and Marcus learn that true maturity means owning up to their mistakes rather than rushing to act like adults. At the same time, Wishbone learns a valuable lesson from his parallel daydream: true worth and heroism come from helping others when needed, not from an arrogant quest for fame and individual glory.
49	9	"Pup Fiction"	Northanger Abbey	Henry Tilney	November 30, 1997	209
Wanda Gilmore begins receiving a series of cryptic, anonymous notes in her mail containing vague, ominous messages. Lacking any context, Wanda completely misinterprets the letters, letting her active imagination convince her that she is the target of a dangerous stalker. Wanda’s panic peaks when she is summoned to a pitch-black gathering at Ellen Talbot's house. When the lights flip on, she discovers it was all an elaborate ruse: her friends sent the vague notes as a series of clever riddles to throw her off the scent of a surprise birthday party. Wanda realizes her anxieties spun a completely normal situation into a terrifying mystery, highlighting the lesson that things are rarely as scary as our imaginations make them out to be.
50	10	"The Roamin' Nose"	Aeneid	Aeneas	December 7, 1997	210
In the series finale, a severe gas leak in the neighborhood forces the residents of Oakdale to evacuate their homes and seek temporary shelter at a local restaurant. While waiting for the leak to be repaired, Joe Talbot, Samantha, and long-time neighborhood rival Damont Jones reflect on their recent eighth-grade graduation. Facing the sudden end of their childhood era, the teenagers grapple with deep anxieties, vulnerability, and uncertainty about their looming high school years. While trapped in the restaurant, Joe and Damont enter a raw, honest conversation where Damont finally drops his arrogant bully persona and comes clean about his past behavior. Damont reveals that he has always felt suffocated by the immense pressure and high expectations his parents place on him to constantly be the absolute best at everything. He admits that his fear of failing or not living up to those high standards made him lash out and push people away as a defense mechanism. Joe listens with genuine empathy, allowing the two long-standing rivals to finally find common ground and put their past hostility behind them. Once the gas leak is safely repaired, the neighbors return to their homes. Reflecting on their shared future, Joe sits with Wishbone and reassures him that no matter how much their lives change in high school, they will always remain best friends, bringing a heartwarming and definitive conclusion to the series.

=== TV movie (1998) ===
Title	Inspired by	Wishbone's role	Original release date	Prod. code
Wishbone's Dog Days of the West	Heart of the West ("A Call Loan," "The Reformation of Calliope," "Cupid à la Carte")	"Long Bill" Longley	March 13, 1998	211
After saving Melina from a falling beam and being treated like a hero, Wanda has to deal with a sneaky TV reporter who tries to make people view her as a tyrant.
