= Wes Cunningham =

Wes Cunningham may refer to:

- Wes Cunningham (ice hockey)
- Wes Cunningham (musician)
