= Wishbone (TV series) =

1995 children's television series

- Genre: Children's fantasy; Comedy; Education
- Created by: Rick Duffield
- Starring: Soccer the Dog; Jordan Wall; Adam Springfield; Christie Abbott; Mary Chris Wall; Angee Hughes; Julio Cedillo; Mikaila Enriquez; Paul English, Jr.
- Voices of: Larry Brantley
- Theme music composer: Tim Cissell (music and lyrics); Lynn Adler (lyrics)
- Opening theme: "What's the Story, Wishbone?"
- Ending theme: "What's the Story, Wishbone?" (instrumental)
- Composer: Tom Merriman
- Country of origin: United States
- Original language: English
- No. of seasons: 2
- No. of episodes: 50 (list of episodes)

Production
- Executive producer: Rick Duffield
- Production locations: Plano, Texas; Allen, Texas
- Running time: 30 minutes
- Production company: Big Feats! Entertainment

Original release
- Network: PBS
- Release: October 8, 1995 – December 7, 1997

Related
- Wishbone's Dog Days of the West

Wishbone is an American live-action children's television series that aired from 1995 to 1997 and originally broadcast on PBS. It is about a male Jack Russell Terrier dog named Wishbone who daydreams about being the lead character of stories from classic literature.

The show was produced by Big Feats! Entertainment, a division of Lyrick Studios, which also produced Barney & Friends for PBS. Unlike Barney, Wishbone was targeted towards an older demographic ages 6 to 11 years old. The adapted stories were notable for staying faithful to the source material, and not toning down their subject matter like murder, execution, suicide, and the effects of slavery.

Though the series was meant for children, thousands of letters were received from college students and parents saying how much they enjoyed the show.

== Premise ==
A standard episode of Wishbone consists of an opening scene, introducing a contemporary plot in Wishbone's hometown of Oakdale. Something about the situation reminds Wishbone of a famous work of literature, which he introduces to the viewer. The episode then cuts between an adaptation of that work, usually with Wishbone portraying the main character, and the contemporary plot. Occasionally, Wishbone will play a secondary character if the lead role is female (in Joan of Arc, he plays Louis de Conte) or difficult to relate to (he plays Sancho Panza in Don Quixote). The development of the contemporary plot parallels that of the literary work, particularly in their dénouements.

The last two minutes of nearly every episode are a behind-the-scenes featurette titled "Tail Ends", narrated by Wishbone and focusing on a production department whose work was particularly prominent in the episode, such as lighting for "The Legend of Sleepy Hollow" or make-up for Frankenstein.

== Cast ==
- Soccer the Dog as Wishbone (Larry Brantley as the voice of Wishbone)
- Jordan Wall as Joseph "Joe" Talbot, Wishbone's young owner
- Christie Abbott as Samantha "Sam" Kepler, one of Joe's best friends
- Adam Springfield as David Barnes, one of Joe's best friends
- Mary Chris Wall as Ellen Talbot, Joe's widowed mother and reference librarian at Oakdale's public library
- Angee Hughes as Wanda Gilmore, the Talbots' eccentric neighbor
- Joe Duffield as Damont Jones, a school bully. In Season 2 he transitions from being a one-dimensional bully into a complex frenemy who ultimately becomes a true friend.
- Jarrad Kritzstein as Jimmy Kidd (season 2), Damont's obnoxious younger cousin
- Julio Cedillo as Travis del Río (season 2), the owner of the local sporting goods store
- Mikaila Enriquez as Melina Finch (season 2), Travis' niece
- Paul English, Jr. as Marcus Finch (season 2), Travis' nephew

=== Recurring cast ===
- Bob Reed as Walter Kepler, Sam's father and the owner of the local pizza parlor
- Alex Morris as Nathaniel "Nathan" Barnes, David's father
- Maria Arita as Ruth Vincent Barnes, David's mother
- Jazmine McGill as Emily Barnes (season 1), David's rambunctious younger sister
- Brittany Holmes as Emily Barnes (season 2)
- Rick Perkins as Bob Pruitt (season 1), the kids' English teacher and later Wanda's boyfriend
- Justin Reese as Nathanael Bobolesky (season 1), a nerdy classmate
- Elena Hurst as Amanda Hollings (season 1), Sam's nemesis
- Taylor Pope as Curtis (season 1), Damont's sidekick
- Codie Elaine Oliver as Robin, another friend of Joe's
- John S. Davies as Mr. King, an obnoxious businessman
- Adan Sanchez as Dan Bloodgood (season 2), the mail carrier

=== The Wishbone Players ===
- Amy Acker (season 2)
- Brent Anderson
- Jonathan Brent
- Sharon Bunn
- Christopher Carlos
- Chamblee Ferguson
- Shea Fowler
- Sonny Franks (season 1)
- Lisa-Gabrielle Greene (season 1)
- Dee Hennigan
- Sean Hennigan
- Billy Eugene Jones
- Lynn Mathis
- Randy Moore (season 1)
- Joe Nemmers
- Kevin Page
- Lanell Pena
- Jenny Pichanick
- Jeanne Simpson (season 1)
- Cliff Stephens
- Matt Tompkins
- Jenni Tooley (season 2)
- Sally Nystuen Vahle

=== Notable guest cast ===
- Jensen Ackles as Michael Dunn, Ellen's protégé ("¡Viva Wishbone!")
- Melissa Archer as Sarah Johnson, a classmate on whom David has a crush ("A Bone of Contention")
- Shelley Duvall as Renee Lassiter, a sculptor ("Groomed for Greatness")
- Irma P. Hall as Dr. Thelma Brown, a former Oakdale resident ("Digging Up the Past")
- Jerry Haynes as Hubert Lassiter, a kind man who rescues a lost Wishbone ("Golden Retrieved")
- Daryl Johnston as himself, a former football player ("Moonbone")
- Cody Linley as Andrew, one of Ichabod Crane's students in Wishbone's telling of "The Legend of Sleepy Hollow" ("Halloween Hound, Part 1")
- Marco Perella as Seymour LaVista, a TV commercial producer ("Rushin' to the Bone")

== Production ==
=== Development ===
Wishbone was conceived by Rick Duffield after brainstorming with his staff about "making a show for kids that was told from a dog's point of view". Following several iterations of this idea, including one in which the dog loved music and another in which he brought good luck (hence the name Wishbone), Duffield hit on the idea of Wishbone imagining himself as heroic figures from literature. His eventual goal was "an entertaining way for kids to get their first taste of great books".

Humorist Mo Rocca was a writer on the series in 1995. In his 2016 commencement speech at Sarah Lawrence College, Rocca described the experience as "storytelling boot camp," noting that the job required adapting classic literature into half-hour episodes with a dog in the lead role.

=== Casting ===
In the summer of 1993, Duffield spent three days casting for the dog star at a motel courtyard in Valencia, California, looking at between 100 and 150 dogs. After filming a seven-minute pilot which captured Wishbone's character and suggested the show's format, he presented it to PBS.

Larry Brantley, the voice of Wishbone, was cast following "a five-minute impromptu audition" in which he imagined Wishbone's thoughts as Soccer "was obsessing, like, over this tennis ball".

For the literary scenes, the producers created a repertory company of local stage actors, dubbed The Wishbone Players.

=== Filming ===
Wishbone's exterior shots were filmed on the backlot of Lyrick Studios' division Big Feats! Entertainment in Allen, Texas, and its interior shots were filmed on a sound stage in a 50,000-square-foot (4,600 m^{2}) warehouse in Plano, Texas. Additional scenes were filmed in Grapevine, Texas. Duffield told Entertainment Tonight,

Keeping up with the variety in the series is the biggest challenge. Because Wishbone is the central figure of each show and plays an integral role in the contemporary story and the literary story, he's in almost every scene. So he has a lot to do and designing scenes that can work with a dog, with period actors and period sets, as well as kids in a contemporary world is a big challenge.

Each episode of Wishbone cost around $500,000 to produce. Almost all of the budget (excluding $1 million provided by PBS via a license fee) was provided out of pocket by Richard Leach and was subsidized by the success and popularity of Lyrick's flagship show, Barney & Friends.

Despite acclaim from critics and educators, only 50 episodes were produced. The first 40 episodes were shown as a single-season run in 1995, while the remaining ten episodes became the second season in 1997–1998. Duffield told author Michael Brody that PBS halted production because the show did not have "merchandising potential".

Soccer the Dog made promotional appearances at shopping malls across the United States, greeting fans from a red armchair. According to Mental Floss, the dog traveled first class, stayed in four-star hotels, and had his own security detail; handlers reportedly gave Soccer the codename "The President."

== Release ==
The series aired on PBS and premiered in the United States on October 8, 1995. The final episode aired on December 7, 1997. After the series ended, reruns continued to air until August 31, 2001. The series returned in reruns on PBS Kids Go! on June 2, 2007. Wishbone clips came to the PBS Kids Go! website. The return to PBS lasted a short time, although some PBS stations continued to air Wishbone until October 7, 2013.

The series was broadcast internationally in numerous countries. In addition to airings on Nickelodeon in the UK and Ireland and Nine Network in Australia, the show aired on YTV in Canada.

Several episodes were released on VHS between 1995 and 1998.

In 2004, HIT Entertainment released four episodes on individual DVDs: "Hot Diggety Dawg", "The Impawssible Dream", "The Hunchdog of Notre Dame", and "Paw Prints of Thieves". These were then compiled into a single DVD released in 2011.

== Reception ==
This show garnered particular praise for refusing to bowdlerize many of the sadder or more unpleasant aspects of the source works, which usually enjoyed a fairly faithful retelling in the fantasy sequences.

=== Awards ===
- Academy of Television Arts & Sciences First Honor Roll of Children's Programming, 1999
- George Foster Peabody Award, 1998
- Emmy Award – Art Direction/Set Decoration/Scenic Design, 1997
- Emmy Award – Costume Design/Styling, 1997
- Emmy Award – Graphics and Title Design, 1997
- Emmy Award – Costume Design/Styling, 1996
- Emmy Award Nominations, 1998, "Wishbone's Dog Days of the West"
- Directing in a Children's Special
- Art Direction/Set Decoration/Scenic Design
- Main Title Design
- Costume Design/Styling
- Television Critics Association – Best Children's Show, 1996 and 1997

== Wishbone in other media ==
The TV movie Wishbone's Dog Days of the West was aired on PBS stations on March 13, 1998, and released to video on June 9, 1998.

=== Books ===
The TV series inspired several book series including Wishbone Classics, Wishbone Mysteries, and The Adventures of Wishbone. Altogether, more than fifty books have featured Wishbone, which continued to be published even after the TV series ended production.

=== Video games ===
There are multiple video games based on the series in 1996 and 1997, including Wishbone Activity Center, Wishbone Print Tricks, Wishbone and the Amazing Odyssey, and Wishbone Activity Zone.

Wishbone Activity Zone (1997), developed by Riedel Software Productions and published by Palladium Interactive, was released alongside a companion website.

=== Film adaptation ===
On July 15, 2020, it was announced that Universal Pictures and Mattel's film division are developing a film adaptation of the series. Peter Farrelly will produce the film while Roy Parker will write the screenplay and Robbie Brenner will executive produce. It will be the first theatrical collaboration between Universal and Mattel and the ninth Mattel Films project in development.

The original Wishbone creative team was not involved in the Mattel/Universal film's development. First assistant director Joey Stewart had initiated an effort to reboot the franchise in 2015, working with producer Betty Buckley to pitch a new project to Mattel. Creator Rick Duffield and head writer Stephanie Simpson were also involved in the pitch. Simpson told Paste in 2022, "It feels like Wishbone is locked in the basement of Mattel and we can't seem to get that dog out of the basement."

=== Documentary ===
A behind-the-scenes documentary on the show was created in honor of its 30th anniversary. The film titled "What’s the Story, Wishbone?" was produced by Novel Tails LLC and features interviews with the original cast and crew. It debuted on PBS on May 27, 2026.

=== Merchandise ===
Products included talking plush toys, character-themed plush featuring Wishbone in literary costumes, and storybook playsets. University Games released a Wishbone board game in 1997. According to Texas Monthly, Lyrick Studios owner Dick Leach had hoped the show's merchandise would replicate the commercial success of Barney & Friends, but Wishbone products did not achieve the same breakthrough.

=== Others ===
In 2021, Wishbone was spoofed in the stop-motion parody TV series Robot Chicken episode (S11E11) "May Cause Episode Title to Cut Off Due to Word Lim", where Wishbone (voiced by Breckin Meyer) plays the role of Anastasia Steele from the erotic romance novel Fifty Shades of Grey.

== See also ==
- Barney & Friends
- Kidsongs
- The Puzzle Place
- Groundling Marsh
