= NYC Busker Ball =

Ars event

NYC Busker Ball is a buskers festival Buskers festival conceived and organized by busker, musician and artist Theo Eastwind, an active subway performer. His first NYC Busker Ball, which took place on January 23, 2013, was staged at a nightclub called Spike Hill in Brooklyn, NY, and was organized as a charity event to raise money to be donated to the American Red Cross to assist in their effort to aid those suffering in the aftermath of Hurricane Sandy.

== History ==
Eastwind issued a call to action to other street performers he knew at the time to join him and be part of the benefit that night. This first NYC Busker Ball was very well attended by members of the local community. He and the others entertained those in attendance for over five hours with their music. The proceeds from their performances were then donated as planned to the relief effort.

After the successful reception of the initial event a decision was made to continue the NYC Busker Ball series on a quarterly basis. Artists who are featured at these concerts still consist of entertainers who utilize public spaces as their stage. The concept has now spread to other cities around the world and they are usually hosted by other local buskers and street performers in the venue's surrounding area.

A portion of the proceeds from the NYC Busker Ball now go toward educating other musicians in the art of busking, especially about the protection provided by the First Amendment to the United States Constitution such as the freedom of speech, right of assembly, and freedom of association, and how that relates to the ability of an artist to perform on publicly owned property.

== List of Events ==
| Date of the event | Name | Performers |
|---|---|---|
| January 23, 2013 | NYC Busker Ball I | Gillen & Turk, Natalia Paruz a.k.a. the 'Saw Lady', Yaz Band, Mountain Animation, The Meetles, Gabriel Royal, Theo Eastwind. |
| April 25, 2013 | NYC Busker Ball II | Ken Ruan, The Lions, Jesse Cohen, Gillen & Turk, Mountain Animation, Theo Eastwind. |
| July 24, 2013 | NYC Busker Ball III | Color Collage, Eli Bridges, Jesse Cohen, Theo Eastwind, Mountain Animation, Gabriel Royal. |
| October 30, 2013 | NYC Busker Ball IV | Arthur Medrano, Ken Ruan, Theo Eastwind, Mountain Animation, Eli Bridges, Jesse Cohen. |
| January 23, 2014 | NYC Busker Ball V | Robert Leslie, Supremo Massive, Mount Moon, Theo Eastwind, Blueberry Season, Gabriel Royal. |
| April 24, 2014 | NYC Busker Ball VI | Luke Ryan, Milk Mother, Theo Eastwind, Mountain Animation, Robert Leslie, Street Meat (from Canada). |
| July 24, 2014 | NYC Busker Ball VII | Ken Ruan, Emore Saylavee, Theo Eastwind, Cathy Grier, Gabriel Royal, Mr. Reed. |
| October 30, 2014 | NYC Busker Ball VIII | Heidi Kole, Grace Kalambay, Theo Eastwind, Eli Bridges, Kathy Russo, The Blue Vipers of Brooklyn. |
| April 3, 2015 | NYC Busker Ball IX | Caeser Passée, Robert Leslie, The Good Morning Nags, House Of Waters, Bandits On The Run, Eli Bridges, Andrew Kalleen |
| July 3, 2015 | NYC Busker Ball X | Stories For Days, ParallelAktion + MC Juda, Robert Leslie, Theo Eastwind, Gabriel Royal, Good Morning Nags, Eli Bridges |
| October 2, 2015 | NYC Busker Ball XI | Chris Zurich, Theo Eastwind, Nicola, Meca Bodega, Jadon & Friends, Cameron Orr, Eli Bridges & Friends |
| July 15, 2016 | NYC Busker Ball XII | Malang Jabarthe, Andrew Kalleen, Theo Eastwind, Gabriel Royal, Jahstix, Zack Orion, BuskNY, Eli and friends |
| April 23, 2022 | NYC Busker Ball XIII | Eli Bridges, PINC LOUDS, Rachel Haymer, Robert Leslie, Morgan o’Kane, The Saw lady, Gabriel Mayers , Malang Jobarthe, Sean Carey, Peter Chinman |
| July 4, 2022 | NYC Busker Ball XIV at South street Seaport | Grace Kalambay, Gabriel Mayers, Robert Leslie, Pinc Louds & special guests and vendors |
| April 22, 2023 | NYC Busker Ball XV | Justin Sight, Rachel Haymer, Anthony Carerra, Coup de Grace, Kanami, Eli Bridges, Robert Leslie, Gabe Mayers, Triad Brass |
| July 14, 2024 | NYC Busker Ball XVI | Samatha pearl, Gabe Aldort, Rob Mastriani, Justin sight, Robert Leslie. Daniel Simonsen, Erik Jacobson |

== See also ==
Waterloo Busker Carnival
