= Waterloo Busker Carnival =

Buskers festival in Waterloo, Ontario

The Waterloo Busker Carnival is a not-for-profit, volunteer operated buskers festival in Waterloo, Ontario, where families from Waterloo, Kitchener, Guelph, Cambridge, and communities in the Region of Waterloo are treated to street performances by buskers from Canada and around the world. Started in 1989, the carnival is now considered to be one of the premier busker carnivals not just in Canada but around the world. Nearly 80 thousand people attend the 4-day event held during the last week in August.

== History ==
The very first busker festival in Waterloo ran from September 7 to 10, 1989. It was meant to be a teaser to the 100th anniversary of the Waterloo Chamber of Commerce in August 1990. It was a result of a visit to Halifax in 1988 by Dave Sandrock, President of Waterloo Bedding and head of the chamber's tourism committee, where he saw the International Busker Festival. 60 buskers performed over 17 days.

As a result, the Waterloo Busker Carnival was produced by Buskers International Festivals Inc. from Halifax. The local committee members included such notables in the community as Dale Wilcox (Fairway Group), Bill Renauld (Newtex Cleaners), Alan Chalmers (Forbes Motors), and Jim Brickman (Brick Brewing Company). The first busker carnival was well received.

The 3rd annual Waterloo Busker Carnival was trimmed back to a 4-day event from August 22 to 25, 1991, and 19 busker acts. A new logo with the busker face and juggling pins appeared for the first time on advertising and posters.

On the Wednesday night August 26, 1998, the 10th anniversary of the carnival featured the very first Festival of Fools which was held at the Canadian Clay and Glass Gallery. For $50 per ticket, attendees were treated to food, drink, and a chance to mingle with the buskers. The event was hosted by busker, Tawny Ross, now known as Aytahn of Acme Circus.

In June 2011, the carnival announced a major change to its financial support. Sun Life Financial, a long-time sponsor, signed on to be the title sponsor for the next 3 years resulting in a name change to the Sun Life Financial Waterloo Busker Carnival. Sun Life Financial renewed its title sponsorship in 2013 and in 2022 the Carnival changed its name to the Sun Life Waterloo Busker Carnival to align with the title sponsor's name change.

On Thursday, August 23, 2012, Argentina's Victor Rubilar, 4-time Guinness World Record Holder, unofficially set a new Guinness World Record for the most soccer ball face rolls at the Opening Ceremonies of the 24th carnival.

== 25th Anniversary Celebration, August 2013 ==
=== Opening ceremonies ===
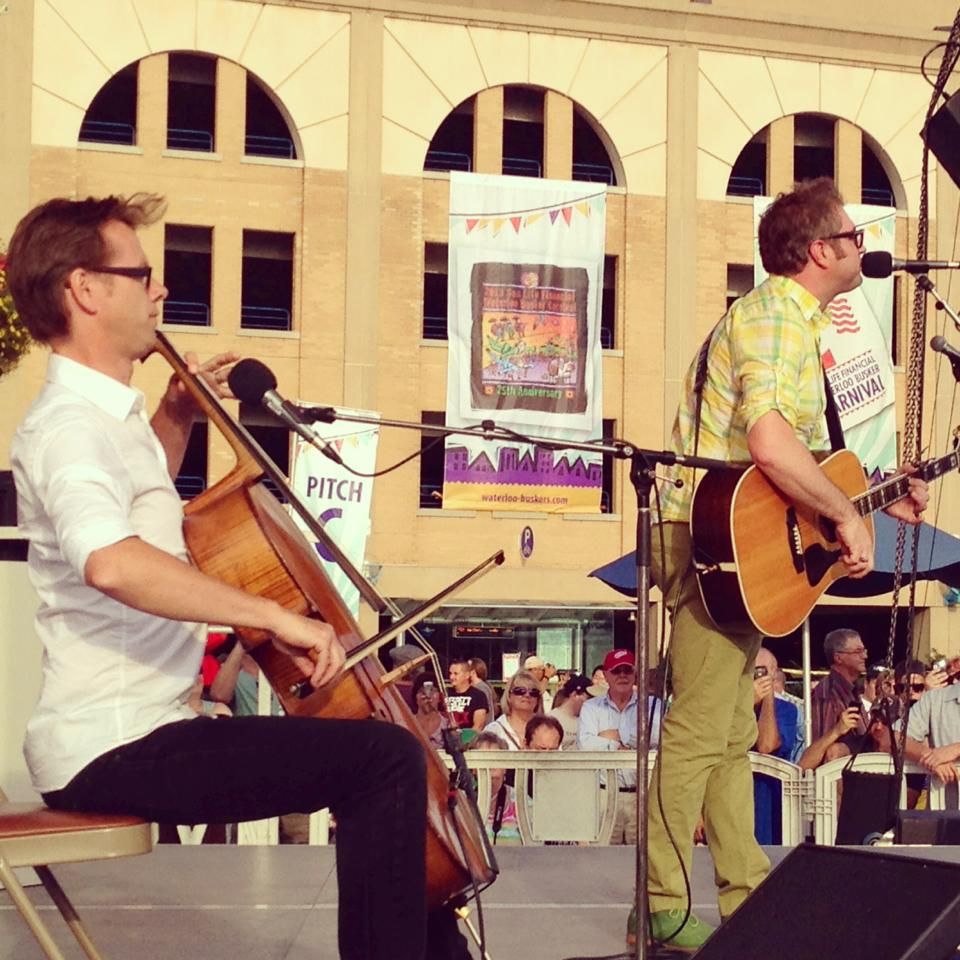
Steven Page opens the 25th Anniversary of the carnival.

Michele Schroder, Director of Entertainment, learning that The Barenaked Ladies appeared at the 2nd Waterloo Busker Carnival (before they coincidentally had a name) was on a mission to have them kickoff the 25th anniversary of the Carnival. This led to talks with former BNL front man, Steven Page, and early in 2013, the contract was signed. On Thursday, August 22, 2013 at 6:30pm, Steven Page performed for a packed Waterloo Public Square and launched the 25th anniversary with a one-hour-long free concert. Supported by Canadian cello player and composer, Kevin Fox, Steven Page performed BNL favourites that he authored as well as new songs from his solo act. Steven Page would later return for the Carnival's 30th Anniversary.

=== Festival of Fools ===
On the evening of Wednesday, August 21, 2013, the Festival of Fools celebrated 15 years of raising funds for the carnival at the RIM Park Sportsplex Complex of the City of Waterloo. It was hosted by 25-year veteran, David Aiken (Checkerboard Guy) – a busker from the very first carnival in Waterloo. The show featured a series of 10-minute performances by the Busker Fan Favourites from the past 25 years. In 2017, after 19 years, the Festival of Fools co-hosted the final Festival of Fools fundraising event which included a silent auction with proceeds going to KW Counselling.

=== Special Recognition Awards ===
Special Recognition Awards for Dedication and Support throughout 25 years of the carnival were presented to the City of Waterloo, UpTown Waterloo, CTV Kitchener, Airways Transit, and Sun Life Financial.

Two more of these awards were presented to Waterloo Busker Carnival committee members who each had 24 consecutive years of service:

Tracey Johnston-Aldworth joined the busker carnival committee in 1990 for the second carnival and served in various roles including Chair throughout the 24 years. Her company, Traces Screen Printing Limited has sponsored the carnival throughout that time. Her ongoing participation with the Waterloo Busker Carnival, her 1994 Environmental Achievement Award from the Kitchener-Waterloo Chamber of Commerce, and her 1995 Environmental Award from the Region of Waterloo for leading environmental practices at Traces Screen Printing Limited contributed to being recognized with The Waterloo Award in 1998 – the City of Waterloo's highest civic honour for contributing to the community without any personal gain. In 2001, she was awarded with an Environmental Sustainability Award from the Region of Waterloo for her ecology- friendly business.

Randy Warren, consistently on the carnival committee since the 2nd carnival in 1990, was honoured with The Waterloo Award in 2008- the highest civic honour a person can receive from the City of Waterloo. Since 1989, Randy was a key player in contributing to the success of Waterloo Busker Carnival, by raising sponsorship dollars, procuring festival entertainment, organizing the Festival of Fools, and serving several times as chairperson of the carnival's executive committee. A 2003 graduate of Leadership Waterloo Region, Randy has since served on Leadership Waterloo Region committees.

The Sun Life Waterloo Busker Carnival was named one of the Top 100 festivals in Ontario by the Festivals and Events Ontario (FEO) association. The FEO Top 100 Awards program recognizes festivals and events for their excellence in creativity, community engagement and overall event experience. The Carnival is proud to have been selected by a panel of independent judges and to be acknowledged among some of the province’s most widely recognized festivals. The Carnival received the 2023 Top 100 Award on March 8, 2023 during FEO’s “Celebrate” Conference Awards Gala in Niagara Falls.

== See also ==
NYC Busker Ball – Musical event
