= Brandon Dickerson =

American writer, director, and producer

Brandon Dickerson is an American writer, director, and producer whose work includes film, music video, documentary film, and television commercials. He made his feature film directorial debut with the 2011 feature film Sironia, which won the Audience Award at the 2011 Austin Film Festival in October 2011.

His music videos include work for The Jonas Brothers, Demi Lovato, Selena Gomez, Switchfoot, Sixpence None the Richer, Bridgit Mendler, Dishwalla, China Anne McClain, Zendaya, Steven Curtis Chapman and Vince Gill.

In 2000, he won the Gold Lion award at the Cannes Lions International Festival of Creativity. Dickerson is signed with kaboom productions for commercials and music videos.

Dickerson went on to write and direct three additional feature-length projects: Victor, which had a limited theatrical release before later streaming on Netflix; A Single Frame, which won the Heart of Film Audience Award at the Austin Film Festival and was released on Apple TV; and Amanda & Jack Go Glamping, released by Orion Pictures with a limited theatrical and on-demand run, followed by a streaming window on Netflix.

== Awards ==
- Cannes Lions International Advertising Festival, Gold Lion
- Billboard Music Video Awards nominee (6 nominations)
- GMA Dove Award, Music Video of the Year
- Clio Awards, Bronze Clio Awards
- D&AD Award, Silver Pencil
- Association of Independent Commercial Producers (AICP) Award
- AUDIENCE AWARD, (Sironia 2011 Austin Film Festival)
- AUDIENCE AWARD, (A SINGLE FRAME, 2016 Austin Film Festivall)

== Selected music video filmography ==
- "Somebody" – Cast of Lemonade Mouth
- "One and the Same" – Selena Gomez and Demi Lovato
- "It's On" – Cast of Camp Rock 2: The Final Jam
- "Somebody" – Bridgit Mendler
- "Breathe Your Name" – Sixpence None the Richer
- "This Is Home" – Switchfoot
- "Awakening" Switchfoot
- "When You Wish Upon a Star" – Meaghan Martin
- "Three Is a Magic Number" – Mitchel Musso
- "Remembering You" – Steven Curtis Chapman
- “Move” – Thousand Foot Krutch
- “Dreamer” – Bethany Dillon
- “Gone” – TobyMac
- “Anytime You Need a Friend” – The Beu Sisters
- “Do Ya" – Jump5
- “Next Big Thing” – Vince Gill
- “He reigns” Newsboys
- “All I Can Do” Jump5
- “Somewhere in the Middle” – Dishwalla
- “You Already Take Me There” – Switchfoot
- “Superman” – Luna Halo
- “Written on My Heart” – Plus One
- “Live for You” – Rachael Lampa
- “Escape from Reason" – Supertones
- “Last Goodbye” – Kenny Wayne Shepherd
- “A Little More” – Jennifer Knapp
- “Love Liberty Disco” – Newsboys
- “This Is Your Time” – Michael W. Smith
- "There She Goes" – Sixpence None the Richer
- “Free” – Montrel Darrett
- “Gravity” – Delirious?
- “Thicker” – Chasing Furies
- “New Way to Be Human” – Switchfoot
- “There Is Only You” – Smalltown Poets
- “Thicker” – Chasing Furies
- “In My Shoes” – Polarboy
- “Butterfly” – Seven Day Jesus
- “The Devil is Bad” – The W's
- “Ms. Innocence” – Wilshire
- “A Flowery Song” – Five Iron Frenzy
- “Nervous” – Dryve
- “As Long As There Is Christmas” – Play
- “Pure Fun” – Sabrina Bryan
- "Bastanak" – Elissa
- "Erga' Le Shou" – Elissa
- “Better In Stereo” - Dove Cameron

== Television ==
- J.O.N.A.S. (opening sequence Season 2)

== Films ==
- Sironia (writer-director)
- VICTOR (writer-director)
- A SINGLE FRAME (director)
- BENJAMIN DOVE (writer+director) in development
- CALL + RESPONSE (director of film sequences + artist performances)
