= Jordan Wall (actor, born 1981) =

American actor (born 1981)

- Born: Jordan Michael Wall; August 1, 1981 (age 44); Trophy Club, Texas, U.S.
- Occupation: Actor
- Years active: 1995-2002
- Parent(s): Graydon Wall (father); Diane Wall (mother)

Jordan Wall (born August 1, 1981) is a former American actor. He is best known for his role as Joe Talbot in the children's public television show Wishbone (1995-1998).

He grew up in Trophy Club, Texas, the son of Diane Wall, a homemaker, and Graydon Wall, a Mercedes-Benz dealership employee. He has five siblings.

== Filmography ==
Year	Title	Role	Notes
1995-1998	Wishbone	Joseph "Joe" Talbot	
1998	Wishbone's Dog Days of the West	Joseph "Joe" Talbot	
1998	Still Holding On: The Legend of Cadillac Jack	Teen Boy	
2002	The President's Man: A Line in the Sand	Rob Daniels	
2002	The Anarchist Cookbook	Straight-Laced Teen	
