= Larry Brantley =

American actor

- Born: Larry Wayne Brantley
- Occupations: Voice actor; stand-up comedian
- Notable work: Wishbone, Boz the Bear, Brothers in Arms: Earned in Blood
- Spouse: Tracy Brantley

Comedy career
- Years active: 1995–present

Larry Wayne Brantley is an American voice actor and a former stand-up comedian and radio spokesman, best known as the voice of Wishbone, a Jack Russell Terrier who was featured in a PBS children's television series. Brantley, who went to Conroe High School, specializes in character voices. He was also a voice actor on the animated project for children called Boz the Bear, and voiced Corporal Franklin Paddock in Brothers in Arms: Earned in Blood. He was also a volleyball coach in McKinney, Texas for a team called "The Straight Aces" and "Orange Crush". He currently stands as a cast member at Medieval Times Dinner and Tournament in Dallas.

== Filmography ==
=== Anime ===
Year	Title	Role	Notes	Source
2003	Sakura Wars: École de Paris	Jim Evian		
2004	Fullmetal Alchemist	Additional Voices	2 episodes	
2010–2012	One Piece	Hody Jones / Hordy / Fisherman / Epoida / Additional Voices	39 episodes	
2012–2016	Fairy Tail	Chapati Lola	31 episodes	
2016	Dagashi Kashi	Pops	Episode: "Summer Festival, Hotaru, and.../Summer Festival, Saya, and..."	
2016	Pandora in the Crimson Shell: Ghost Urn	Additional Voices	Episode: "Ghost Urn"	
2016	Ace Attorney	Redd White	3 episodes	
2016	Izetta: The Last Witch	Prime Minister Burns	2 episodes	
2016	Drifters	Additional Voices	4 episodes	
2017	Attack on Titan	Additional Voices	Episode: "Ou Mono"	
2017	A Centaur's Life	Additional Voices	Episode: "Senzo ya Rekishi no Koto o Sakanoboreru no wa, Mushiro Kofuku? Soretomo Fuko?/Honto ni Suki na Koto o Shigoto ni suru Koto wa Hatashite Shiawase nano ka na?"	
2017	Kino's Journey —the Beautiful World—	Public Servant	Episode: "Bothersome Country"	
2018	Hinamatsuri	Vice Principal	Episode: "Hobo Life 101"	
2018	Dances with the Dragons	Additional Voices	Episode: "Invitation to an Evening Party"	
2018	Full Metal Panic! Invisible Victory	Additional Voices	2 episodes	
2018	Hakyu Hoshin Engi	Additional Voices	Episode: "Aged Symbols and Diverging Winds"	
2018	Tokyo Ghoul: re	Fura	4 episodes	
2018	That Time I Got Reincarnated as a Slime	Additional Voices	Episode: "The Gears Spin Out of Control"	
2018–2025	My Hero Academia	Spinner/Crust	30 episodes	
2019	How Heavy Are the Dumbbells You Lift?	Additional Voices	Episode: "How Are You Spending New Year's?"	
2019	Afterschool Dice Club	Additional Voices	Episode: "Happy Holy Night"	
2019	My Hero Academia: Heroes Rising	Spinner	Film	
2019	African Office Worker	Toucan	11 episodes	
2019–2020	Black Clover	Kaito's Dad / Additional Voices	2 episodes	
2020	Jibaku Shounen Hanako-kun	Confession Tree	Episode: "The Confession Tree"	
2020	A Certain Scientific Railgun	Chief	Episode: "Joining the Battle"	
2021	Back Arrow	Narrator	Episode: "Do Guys from the Sky Have Undies?"	
2023	MF Ghost	Ogata		
2025	Yakuza Fiancé: Raise wa Tanin ga Ii	Renji Somei		
2025	To Be Hero X	Cheng Yaojin		
2025	Let's Play	Edgar		

=== Film ===
Year	Title	Role	Notes
2006	Thank You God for... Friends and Helpers	Boz (voice)	Direct-to-video
2006	Boz: Colors and Shapes	Boz (voice)	Direct-to-video
2006	Thank You God for... Bananas, Bubbles and Busy Bodies	Boz (voice)	Direct-to-video
2006	Boz: Adventures in Imagination	Boz (voice)	Direct-to-video
2007	Thank You God for... B-O-Zs and 1-2-3s!	Boz (voice)	Direct-to-video
2007	Texas Rangers: Candles	Husband	Direct-to-video
2007	A WowieBozowee Christmas	Boz (voice)	Direct-to-video
2007	Start Singing with Boz	Boz (voice)	Direct-to-video

=== Television ===
Year	Title	Role	Notes
1995–1997	Wishbone	Wishbone / Larry Brinkley (voice)	Main cast; 50 episodes
1998	Wishbone's Dog Days of the West	Wishbone (voice)	TV movie
2006	Inspector Mom	Dicky	Episode: "The Corpse's Costume"
2017	Kings of Atlantis	Phaeton / Titan 2 (voice)	9 episodes; YouTube Red exclusive
Post-production	Stellular	Captain Kyle Trace	TV movie

=== Video games ===
Year	Title	Role	Notes
2005	Brothers in Arms: Earned in Blood	Cpl. Franklin Paddock	
2005	Æon Flux	Soldier #1	
2014	Smite	Sydney Shredder He Bo	
