= Sironia =

- Directed by: Brandon Dickerson
- Written by: Wes Cunningham; Brandon Dickerson; Thomas Ward
- Produced by: Lauren Schwartz; Steven Sills; Laura D. Smith
- Starring: Amy Acker; Wes Cunningham; Tony Hale; Robyn Lively; Carrie Preston; Meaghan Martin
- Cinematography: Jordan Valenti
- Edited by: Michael R. Miller
- Music by: Wes Cunningham
- Release date: October 21, 2011 (Austin Film Festival)
- Country: United States
- Language: English

Sironia is a drama film directed by Brandon Dickerson and starring Amy Acker, Wes Cunningham, Tony Hale, Robyn Lively, Carrie Preston and Meaghan Martin. It was shot on location in Waco, Texas and Los Angeles, California.

== Plot ==
Inspired by the music of singer-songwriter Wes Cunningham, Sironia is the story of a talented musician who has been chewed up and spit out by the Hollywood music machine. Frustrated by his broken career, Thomas Fisher and his wife Molly impulsively pack up and move to small town Sironia, Texas to live a more authentic life and raise their first child near Molly's brother and his family. Despite the change of scenery, Thomas's deep resentment over his lost dreams gets the best of him as he struggles to find peace with his stalled career, until he remembers what he loved about music - and Molly - in the first place.

== Cast ==
- Amy Acker as Molly Fisher
- Carrie Preston as Grace
- Robyn Lively as Barbara
- Tony Hale as Chad
- Jeremy Sisto as Tucker
- Meaghan Martin as Aubrey
- Wes Cunningham as Thomas Fisher
- Ryan Cartwright as Nick
- John Billingsley as Doug
- Courtney Ford as Amanda
- Ryan Eggold as Mason Jones
- Elaine Tan as Danica

== Release ==
Sironia premiered at the 2011 Austin Film Festival in Austin, Texas in October 2011.

== Awards ==
- Audience Award Winner, 2011 Austin Film Festival Festival
