= Soccer (dog) =

Jack Russell Terrier dog actor

- Soccer as Wishbone playing Robin Hood
- Other name: Wishbone
- Species: Canis familiaris
- Breed: Jack Russell Terrier
- Sex: Male
- Born: May 16, 1988; Connecticut, United States
- Died: June 26, 2001 (aged 13); Princeton, Texas, United States
- Resting place: Princeton, Texas, United States
- Occupation: Animal actor
- Notable role: Wishbone on Wishbone
- Years active: 1993–2001
- Tricks: Back flip
- Owner: Jackie Martin Kaptan
- Named after: Soccer ball

Soccer (May 16, 1988 – June 26, 2001) was a Jack Russell Terrier and animal actor. A veteran of many television commercials for such companies as Nike Athletics and Mighty Dog Dog Food, he became famous portraying the talking dog Wishbone in the PBS Kids television series of the same name. Chosen from more than 100 dogs who auditioned for the role, Soccer appeared in almost every episode of the show during its 1995–1998 run. He lived with his trainer, Jackie Martin Kaptan, on the Princeton, Texas, ranch where the Wishbone series was filmed and was buried there after his 2001 death. Soccer, as Wishbone, was considered by many to be one of the most beloved TV dogs of the 1990s.

== Early life ==
Soccer was adopted at 8 weeks old by trainer Jackie Kaptan. He was named due to his markings, namely the patch on his eye and the dots on his ear, which Kaptan thought resembled a soccer ball. Soccer also had a fondness for toy soccer balls.

Prior to Wishbone, Soccer appeared in ads for the dog food brands Mighty Dog and Chuck Wagon, and a print ad for Nike.

== Wishbone ==
Soccer auditioned against 100 other dogs for the title role of Wishbone. Show creator Rick Duffield claimed that seeing Soccer do a backflip was what convinced him to use the dog. Later, when auditioning for the voice of Wishbone, actor Larry Brantley was brought in to meet the dog. As Soccer began playing with his favorite soccer ball, Brantley began to vocalize what he thought the dog was thinking. This led to Brantley getting the role.

Soccer was trained through positive reinforcement, mainly in the form of treats. Some of his tricks were thought up due to his behaviors. for example, a scene in which Wishbone bobs for apples was written after Kaptan saw Soccer retrieve a stone from a bucket of water. Other tricks Soccer knew were a "sleuth dog" army crawl and his signature backflip. Soccer would be dressed in costumes for each show, a total of 100 different costumes for the whole series. Reportedly, he did not mind most clothing, but disliked pants because they hiked up when he jumped.

Soccer was the principal actor for Wishbone, but four other dogs were also used to play the character. Three were for stunts that Soccer could not perform (such as swimming, which he disliked), and the fourth was for publicity stills. Soccer was used for public appearances as Wishbone, visiting schools, malls, and other places to meet with fans. He flew first class, sitting in his own seat.

== Post-Wishbone ==
Soccer had retired by the time he was 13. He lived on Kaptan's ranch, where he had his own room to himself. Shortly before his death, Kaptan had begun training another Jack Russell Terrier named Popeye, to be used in Soccer's place should Wishbone be revived. Upon Soccer's death in 2001, he was buried at the ranch.

== Filmography ==
- Wishbone (1995–1997)
- Wishbone's Dog Days of the West (1998)

== See also ==
- List of individual dogs
