= Adam Springfield =

American actor (born 1982)

- Born: Adam Luke Springfield; November 2, 1982 (age 44); Santa Barbara, California, U.S.
- Occupation: Actor
- Years active: 1995-present

Adam Luke Springfield (born November 2, 1982) is a former American actor. Springfield's most high-profile role was David Barnes in the PBS series Wishbone. Before landing the role of David Barnes in the PBS series Wishbone, Springfield had guest appearances on NBC's Seaquest DSV.

== Career ==
Springfield's first screen role was playing the part of David Barnes in the PBS series Wishbone. He moved on to appear on Seaquest DSV.
