= Angee Hughes =

American actress (born 1955)

- Born: November 22, 1955 (age 70); Memphis, Tennessee
- Occupation: Actress
- Years active: 1994–present

Angee Hughes (born November 22, 1955) is an American actress who has appeared in film, television and theatre productions. She is best known for her role as Wanda Gilmore on the PBS series Wishbone.

== Early life and education ==
Hughes, a native of Memphis, studied theatre arts at Texas State University and subsequently trained at the Circle in the Square Theatre School in New York City.

== Career ==
She played the role of Sara Bardshar in the Spanish–American War themed miniseries Rough Riders and appeared in the Showtime production Lily Dale, alongside Mary Stuart Masterson and Stockard Channing. She has also appeared in a number of television sitcoms including Scrubs and The King of Queens. She also appeared in one episode of the ninth season of Friends, in "The One with the Pediatrician".

== Filmography ==
=== Film ===
Year	Title	Role	Notes
1994	Texas Chainsaw Massacre: The Next Generation	Stuffed Family	
1994	Blank Check	Woman in Parking Lot	
2000	Where the Heart Is	Religious Woman	
2000	Dr. T & the Women	Dr. T's Staff	
2004	Envy	Woman at Party	
2009	17 Again	Waitress	

=== Television ===
Year	Title	Role	Notes
1995	Texas Justice	Carla Delgato	Television film
1995–1997	Wishbone	Wanda Gilmore	50 episodes
1996	Walker, Texas Ranger	Waitress	Episode: "Behind the Badge"
1996	Lily Dale	Mrs. Westheimer	Television film
1996	Don't Look Back	Airport Nun	Television film
1997	Rough Riders	Sara Bardshar	2 episodes
1998	Wishbone's Dog Days of the West	Wanda Gilmore	Television film
2001–2003	Scrubs	Nurse / Admitting Nurse	3 episodes
2002	The King of Queens	Miss Berman	Episode: "Bun Dummy"
2002	Friends	The Nurse	Episode: "The One with the Pediatrician"
2002	Push, Nevada	—N/a	Episode: "···---···"
2002	Malcolm in the Middle	Woman Guest	Episode: "Forwards Backwards"
2003	According to Jim	Ginger Curran	Episode: "No Harm, No Fowl"
2008	The Unit	Cindy Hines	Episode: "Into Hell: Part One"
2010	Gary Unmarried	Sue	Episode: "Gary Has to Choose"
2010	Desperate Housewives	Figurine Collecting Plumming Customer	Episode: "The Ballad of Booth"
2010–2014	Life with Kat & McKay	Cora	7 episodes
2012	The Middle	Annie	Episode: "The Clover"
