= Wishbone's Dog Days of the West =

- VHS cover art
- Written by: Susan B. Chick; Steven Kavner; Michael Anthony Steele
- Story by: Susan B. Chick; Rick Duffield
- Directed by: Rick Duffield
- Starring: Soccer the Dog; Jordan Wall; Mary Chris Wall; Christie Abbott; Angee Hughes; Brent Anderson; Sally Nystuen Vahle; Mark Walters
- Voices of: Larry Brantley
- Music by: Tim Cissell
- Country of origin: United States
- Original language: English

Production
- Producer: Betty A. Buckley
- Cinematography: Bert Guthrie
- Editor: Michael Coleman
- Running time: 95 minutes
- Production company: Big Feats! Entertainment

Original release
- Network: Showtime
- Release: March 13, 1998

Wishbone's Dog Days of the West is a live-action family adventure western telefilm that first aired on Showtime on March 13, 1998. The film was released to video on June 9, 1998. It served as the series finale of the PBS children's show Wishbone, and is the franchise's only feature-length entry.

== Plot ==
At the Oakdale Carnival, Wishbone notices a fraying wire holding a lighting trellis above the stage where the Oakdale Glee Club is performing. He barks to alert Wanda, who saves Melina by pushing her off the stage. A TV reporter, Mitch McCain, appears and initially congratulates Wanda, but quickly begins selectively editing interviews with her and others to portray her as the "town tyrant". Wanda's longtime rival Leon King later reveals that he owns the TV station, and claims that Wanda has no legal claim to ownership of the Oakdale Chronicle, which he has purchased from its previous owner's heir. Joe and his friends seek the assistance of Ethan Johnstone, an elderly man who recalls seeing Wanda's father, Giles, win ownership of the Chronicle in a poker game. With Mr. Johnstone's help, the kids and Wanda's employees prove that she is the newspaper's legal owner and restore her reputation.

The Oakdale story is intertwined with elements of three stories from O. Henry's collection Heart of the West, led by Wishbone as the main character, "Long Bill" Longley, a former cowboy turned banker. Long Bill is faced with the threat of arrest from a bank examiner, J. Edgar Todd, who uncovers an illegal loan that Long Bill made to his best friend, Tom Merwin ("A Call Loan"). Meanwhile, Tom romantically pursues restaurant owner Mame Dugan ("Cupid à la Carte"). Later, the town marshal deputizes Long Bill and Tom during a gunfight with Calliope Catesby, their former colleague whose envy of Long Bill and Tom's relative wealth has led him to alcoholism. However, Calliope realizes his mother is arriving in town, and Long Bill helps him to pose as the marshal for her sake, leading Calliope to promise to change his ways ("The Reformation of Calliope").

== Cast ==
=== Oakdale cast ===
- Soccer the Dog as Wishbone (Larry Brantley as the voice of Wishbone)
- Jordan Wall as Joe Talbot, Wishbone's owner
- Mary Chris Wall as Ellen Talbot, Joe's mother
- Angee Hughes as Wanda Gilmore, the Talbots' neighbor
- Christie Abbott as Samantha "Sam" Kepler, Joe's best friend
- Steve Kavner as Mitch McCain, a TV reporter
- Sean McGraw as Leon King, owner of the TV station
- Lewis Barnett Finnagan III as Hank Dutton, Joe and Sam's friend
- Jim Ponds as Ethan Johnstone, Hank's grandfather
- Julio Cedillo as Travis del Rio, owner of Oakdale Sports & Games
- Mikaila Enriquez as Melina Finch, Travis' niece
- Carolyn McCormick as an Oakdale Chronicle employee

=== O. Henry story cast ===
- Brent Anderson as Tom Merwin
- Sally Nystuen Vahle as Mame Dugan
- Mark Walters as Calliope Catesby
- Matthew Tompkins as Marshal Buck
- Sean Hennigan as J. Edgar Todd
- Molly McClure as Calliope's mother
- William Lawrence Allen as O. Henry

== Production ==
The metafictional Wild West scenes were shot in Galisteo and Santa Fe, New Mexico.

The opening scenes at the Oakdale Carnival were the series' last to be filmed, after which creator Rick Duffield addressed the cast and crew to tell them the show had been canceled.

== Reception ==
The movie won the 1999 Daytime Emmy Award for Outstanding Art Direction/Set Decoration/Scenic Design. It received three further nominations, for Outstanding Costume Design/Styling (Stephen M. Chudej), Outstanding Directing in a Children's Special (Rick Duffield), and Outstanding Main Title Design (Kathryn Yingling).

Reviewing several episodes for Common Sense Media, Nancy Warren wrote that the movie was "one of the best in the Wishbone series", praising its "fast moving plots, finely drawn characters and exciting historical visuals".
