= Buskers festival =

A buskers festival is any festival in which street-shows or Street performers (also known as buskers) of music, theater, dance, juggling, etc., play a prominent role.

Some of the world's more prominent Buskers Festivals are held in Kortrijk (La Rue en Rose), Ferrara, Italy, and various cities in Canada (Halifax, Toronto, Waterloo, Ontario, and Ottawa), but also in Christchurch, New Zealand, Australia, Scotland, Germany and other countries.

Nova Scotia's busker festival is called "Halifax International Busker Festival" and is typically held in August.

== See also ==
- Living statue – Street performance & arts installations
