= Amanda & Jack Go Glamping =

- Theatrical release poster
- Directed by: Brandon Dickerson
- Written by: Brandon Dickerson
- Starring: David Arquette; Amy Acker; Adan Canto; June Squibb; Gustavo Gomez
- Cinematography: Abraham Martinez
- Edited by: May Kuckro
- Music by: BC Smith
- Production company: Spiral Films
- Distributed by: Orion Pictures; Gravitas Ventures
- Release date: November 10, 2017 (United States)
- Running time: 94 minutes
- Country: United States
- Language: English
- Box office: $3,350

Amanda & Jack Go Glamping is a 2017 American comedy-drama film written and directed by Brandon Dickerson and starring David Arquette, Amy Acker, Adan Canto and June Squibb. Principal photography focused in the areas of Elgin, TX and Austin, TX. The film has been released on November 10, 2017 by Orion Pictures and Gravitas Ventures.

== Premise ==
Jack Spencer (David Arquette) has his marriage and career in trouble, he is a dejected author. He decides to leave his kids with his brother in-law and travel with his wife Amanda to an isolated glamping (glamorous camping) retreat in search of a spark in life.

There is a surprise double booking and he finds their private retreat anything but private. Jack then runs into various comedic scenarios, including a friendship with a miniature donkey.

== Cast ==
- David Arquette as Jack Spencer
- Amy Acker as Amanda Spencer
- Adan Canto as Nate
- June Squibb as Jude
- Gustavo Gomez as Jordan

== Reception ==
On review aggregator Rotten Tomatoes, the film has an approval rating of 40% based on 5 reviews, with an average score of 5/10.
