= Mikaila (album) =

Studio album by Mikaila
- Released: March 6, 2001
- Recorded: 2000–2001
- Genres: Dance-pop; teen pop
- Length: 45:36
- Labels: Island; Universal; Uptown
- Producers: Stargate; Arnthor Birgisson; Anders Bagge; Carl Sturken; Evan Rogers; Nokio; Kenya Miller; Andy Goldmark; Fredrik Thomander; Anders Wikström

Mikaila chronology
Dreams (1997)	Mikaila (2001)	Mikaila (Spanish Version) (2001)

Singles from Mikaila
- 1. "So in Love with Two" Released: November 14, 2000; 2. "It's All Up to You" Released: 2001

Professional ratings
Review scores
Source	Rating
AllMusic	3/5 stars
Vibe	2.5/5 stars

Mikaila is the self titled third and final album by American former actress and singer Mikaila. The album was released on March 6, 2001, and includes Mikaila's hit song "So in Love with Two".

== Release ==
The album was released by Island Records on March 6, 2001. In advance of the album's release, Mikaila performed on Macy's Thanksgiving Day Parade and on Fox Family Channel's Front Row Center Concert Series. The album itself was a moderate commercial success debuting at number twenty on the US Billboard Top Heatseekers chart on the date of March 24, 2001 and staying on the chart for three weeks. A few months after its release, she released a Spanish version of the album.

=== Singles ===
The album's lead single "So in Love with Two" was released in November 2000, when Mikaila was thirteen years old. Multiple versions of the song were released, including a Spanish-language version titled "Este Amor de Dos". The song peaked at No. 29 on the Rhythmic Top 40 Billboard chart, No. 25 on the Billboard Hot 100 and No. 27 on Billboard's Top 40 Mainstream.

== Critical reception ==
The album received mixed reviews from music critics. AllMusic's Jon Azpiri awarded the album three out of five stars and commended Mikaila for bringing "a much-needed dose of hip-hop to the teen pop genre" but criticizing the ballads as "obligatory".

== Track listing ==
1. "So in Love with Two" (Mikkel Eriksen, Tor Erik Hermansen, Hallgeir Rustan, Mikaila) – 3:26
2. "Straight to My Face" (Anders Bagge, Arnthor Birgisson, Nina Woodford) – 3:36
3. "Forever, For Always, For You" (Carl Sturken and Evan Rogers) – 4:17
4. "Playground" (Bagge, Birgisson, Reed Vertelney) – 3:57
5. "Talkin' Bout Me" (Kenya Miller, Tamir Ruffin) – 3:44
6. "It's All Up to You" (Eriksen, Hermansen, Rustan) – 3:55
7. "Perfect World" (Sturken, Rogers) – 3:59
8. "My Dream Is Gone" (Eriksen, Hermansen, Rustan) – 3:34
9. "My Heaven" (Andy Goldmark, Mark Mueller, Robbie Nevil) – 3:34
10. "Emotional" (Fredrik Thomander, Anders Wikström, Jeff Coplan) – 3:12
11. "Because of You" (Shaffer Smith, Eriksen, Hermansen) – 4:12
12. "My Heart Can't Let You Go" (Mikaila, Goldmark, Mueller) – 4:09
13. "You Tell Me" – 3:01 (UK and Japanese bonus track)
14. "The Art of Letting Go" (Goldmark, J.D. Martin) – 3:54 (Japanese bonus track)
15. "Este Amor de Dos" (So in Love with Two) (Eriksen, Hermansen, Rustan, Mikaila) – 3:28 (European bonus track)
