= Dryve =

American band

- L–R: Keith Andrew, David Pratschner, Michael Pratschner, Steve Pratschner, Paul Donovan, Cory Verner

Background information
- Origin: San Diego, California, U.S.
- Genres: Alternative rock, Christian rock
- Years active: 1993–1998
- Label: SaraBellum
- Website: dryve.net

Dryve was an alternative/roots/pop/rock band from San Diego, California. The band's unusual instrumentation – including a Hammond organ, accordions, and a harmonica – gave them a unique sound. The San Diego music scene is well known for producing Christian rock bands such as Switchfoot and P.O.D., and despite its brief national life Dryve produced what the Encyclopedia of Contemporary Christian Music calls "stellar examples of Christian rock at its best."

== History ==
The band was formed in 1993 when two folk duos merged to create one group. The first consisted of Paul Donovan (guitar, vocals) and Cory Verner, (guitar, vocals) childhood friends who had played together since about 1990, and the second of Keith Andrew (drums) and Steve Pratschner (guitar). With the addition of David (keyboard, sax, organ) and Michael Pratschner (upright and regular bass guitar), both brothers of Steve Pratschner, the band's lineup was complete. By the fall of that year that had recorded their first demo, dubbed South. In November 1994 they released their independently produced debut, Hum. The release lead to some local recognition: The first track, "Happy Song", won the 1994 San Diego Songwriter's Guild contest, and the album was nominated in the "Best Rock Album" category at the 1995 San Diego Music Awards.

Dryve became well known locally, and between 1995 and 1996 Dryve played 90 shows in the San Diego area. During this time they opened for acts such as Possum Dixon, Sonia Dada, and Jeff Buckley. Their break came in 1996 after opening for Black Eyed Sceva, later known as Model Engine, at a local show. They signed with SaraBellum Records and soon began touring the country. Their first national tour was in the fall of 1996 with labelmates Black Eyed Sceva and the Dime Store Prophets.

February 1997 saw the release of what was to be the band's only nationally distributed album, Thrifty Mr Kickstar. In support they toured with Sixpence None the Richer and Model Engine. In June of that year Dryve was featured at the Cornerstone Christian music festival. Thrifty was critically acclaimed, and took the title of "Best Adult Alternative Album" at the 1997 San Diego Music Awards. Their song "Nervous" received some radio airplay alternative rock stations and charted on Contemporary Christian music stations, peaking at No. 22. The band's final tour began in October 1997 with The Call.

Dryve broke up in 1998.

== Style ==
Dryve brought a unique sound to the San Diego music scene and beyond. For instance, few bands use a Hammond organ, but even fewer bands tour with one. They also mixed two male vocalists, harmonica, and accordion into their songs. The resulting sound was so unusual that Cross Rhythms commented that "the only band that sound like Dryve is Dryve!" Other reviewers classified their sound as melodic rock similar to Tom Petty, R.E.M., or the Wallflowers. Their most popular song was called "Rain". It has been played by worship groups in churches throughout the country. Part of its appeal was the lengthy, dreamy, yet powerful guitar solo by Steve Pratschner. As described by The Lighthouse: "It starts off slow and worshipful... Then it grows and grows to a full extended instrumental jam of praise."

Other standout songs included "Nervous": a "near perfect hit single", and "Television": an angst-tinged hard rock tune.

Lyrically Thrifty included songs touching topics such as sin, pride, hope, and despair, while managing "to avoid the sometimes confusing lingo of the evangelical Christian subculture".

== Discography ==
- 1993: South (independent)
- 1994: Hum (independent)
- 1995: Five Song Demo (independent)
- 1997: Thrifty Mr Kickstar (Sarabellum Records)

== Members ==
- Keith Andrew - drums
- Paul Donovan - guitar, vocals
- David Pratschner - keyboard, sax, accordion, Hammond B3 organ
- Michael Pratschner - bass guitar (regular and upright bass)
- Steve Pratschner - guitar
- Cory Verner - guitar, vocals
