= Wes Cunningham (musician) =

Filipino-born American musician

Wes Cunningham is a Philippine-born American musician who grew up in Texas. His debut album, "12 Ways to Win People to Your Way of Thinking", was released on the Warner Brothers label in 1998. "So It Goes" was released as a single and peaked at #11 on Billboard's Adult Alternative chart in February 1999.

After parting ways with Warner, Cunningham released a second album, Pollyanna, in 2001 on the Nashville-based Pentavarit label. Gary Glauber wrote in a 2002 PopMatters review, "If the tremendously talented Wes Cunningham releases a second CD and no one really knows about it, is there any justice whatsoever?". Growing disenchanted with the music industry, Cunningham moved back to Waco, Texas, focusing less on performing and more on commercial songwriting. He starred in the 2011 film Sironia, which was inspired by his own experiences

== Discography ==
- 12 Ways to Win People to Your Way of Thinking (1998)
- Pollyanna (2001)
