= Mikaila =

American former singer and former actress (born 1986)

- Born: Mikaila Dominique Enriquez; December 15, 1986 (age 39); Edmond, Oklahoma, U.S.
- Genres: Gospel; pop; dance-pop; teen pop
- Occupations: Singer, actress, songwriter
- Instrument: Vocals
- Years active: 1996–2002
- Labels: Union Records (1996-1997); Island (2000–2002)
- Website: myspace.com/mikailamusic

Mikaila Dominique Enriquez (born December 15, 1986), known as Mikaila, is an American singer, actress, and songwriter from Edmond, Oklahoma. She is best known for her 2000 single "So in Love with Two".

== Early life ==
Mikaila became interested in singing when she was 3 years old. She is of French, Spanish and Native Mexican descent. Mikaila's family were members of Citychurch. She also has an older sister named Jessica. At the age of three she began singing gospel music. Mikaila's parents enrolled her in voice lessons when she was four years old. She attended Washington Irving Elementary School in Oklahoma. After moving to Dallas with her family, she became a regular performer at Texas Rangers games. After heading to New York, she had meetings with several labels. It was at that time that Barbara Cameron, the mother of former Growing Pains star Kirk Cameron and former Full House star Candace Cameron Bure became her agent. Marty Rendleman eventually became her music manager.

== Career ==
In 1996, Mikaila was signed to the independent record label Union Records and released her debut gospel album This Little Light. Proceeds from the album benefited children who lost their parents in the 1995 Oklahoma City Bombing. The following year, Mikaila released her second album Dreams. Then in 1997, she was cast as Melina Finch during the second season of Wishbone. In 1998, she reprised her role in the film Wishbone's Dog Days of the West; Mikaila performed "America the Beautiful" and "This Little Light of Mine" on the film's soundtrack.

In 2000, at the age of 13, Mikaila left Union Records and signed to Island Records. That year, she released the single "So in Love with Two" which went to No. 29 on the Rhythmic Top 40 Billboard chart, No. 25 on the Billboard Hot 100, and No. 27 on Billboard's Top 40 Mainstream chart. Mikaila was the opening act for Britney Spears during her Oops!... I Did It Again Tour. In November 2000, Mikaila performed "So in Love with Two" during the 74th Annual Macy's Thanksgiving Day Parade. In December 2000, she performed at Jingle Ball 2000.

In March 2001, Mikaila released her third and final studio album Mikaila. The album reached No. 20 on the Top Heatseekers chart and was followed by a Spanish version of the album a few months later. Her second and final single from the album, "It's All Up to You", failed to impact any major charts. Later that year, Mikaila's track "Perfect World" was featured on the soundtrack for the film Get Over It. In 2002, Mikaila retired from the entertainment industry. After graduating from high school, Mikaila moved to Phoenix, Arizona.

== Discography ==
=== Studio albums ===
- This Little Light (1996)
- Dreams (1997)
- Mikaila (2001)
- Mikaila (Spanish Version) (2001)

=== Singles ===
- "So in Love with Two" (2000)
- "It's All Up to You" (2001)
- "Este Amor de Dos" (2001)
