= 26th Young Artist Awards =

2005 US media awards ceremony

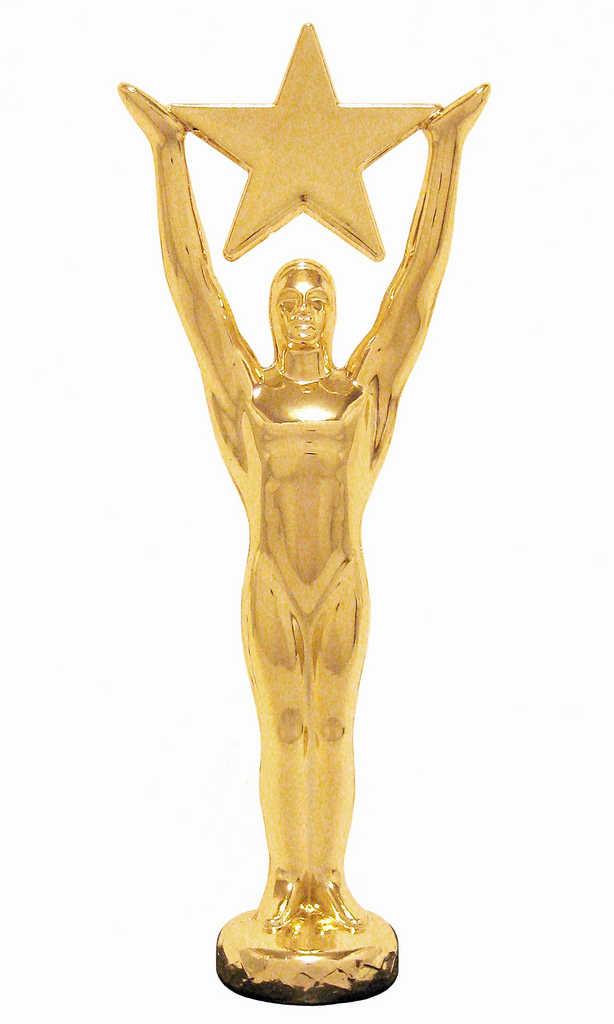
- Awarded for: Achievement in 2004 in film and television
- Date: April 30, 2005
- Site: Sportsmen's Lodge; Studio City, Los Angeles, California
- Hosted by: Emmy Rossum

The 26th Young Artist Awards ceremony, presented by the Young Artist Association, honored excellence of young performers under the age of 21 in the fields of film and television for the year 2004, and took place on April 30, 2005, at the Sportsmen's Lodge in Studio City, Los Angeles, California.

Established in 1978 by long-standing Hollywood Foreign Press Association member, Maureen Dragone, the Young Artist Association was the first organization to establish an awards ceremony specifically set to recognize and award the contributions of performers under the age of 21 in the fields of film, television, theater and music.

== Categories ==
★ Bold indicates the winner in each category.

== Best Performance in a Feature Film ==
=== Best Performance in a Feature Film - Leading Young Actor ===
★ Jamie Bell - Undertow - MGM/UA

- Liam Aiken - Lemony Snicket's A Series of Unfortunate Events - Paramount/DreamWorks
- Rory Culkin - Mean Creek - Paramount Classics
- Freddie Highmore - Finding Neverland - Miramax
- Bobby Preston - Motocross Kids - Tag Ent.
- Evan Peters - Clipping Adam

=== Best Performance in a Feature Film - Leading Young Actress ===
★ Emmy Rossum - The Phantom of the Opera - Warner Bros.

- Emily Browning - Lemony Snicket's A Series of Unfortunate Events - Paramount/DreamWorks
- Dakota Fanning - Man on Fire - 20th Century Fox
- Carly Schroeder - Mean Creek - Paramount Classics
- Alexa Vega - Sleepover - MGM

=== Best Performance in a Feature Film - Supporting Young Actor ===
★ Devon Alan - Undertow - MGM/UA

- Cameron Bright - Birth - New Line Cinema
- Hunter Gomez - National Treasure - Disney
- Malcolm David Kelley - You Got Served - Sony Pictures
- C. J. Sanders - Ray - Universal

=== Best Performance in a Feature Film - Supporting Young Actress ===
★ Kallie Flynn Childress - Sleepover - MGM

- Shelbie Bruce - Spanglish - Columbia
- Hannah Pilkes - The Woodsman - Newmarket Films
- Sarah Steele - Spanglish - Columbia
- Kristen Stewart - Undertow - MGM/UA

=== Best Performance in a Feature Film - Young Actor Age Ten or Younger ===
★ Luke Spill - Finding Neverland - Miramax

- Ian Hyland - Spanglish - Columbia

=== Best Performance in a Feature Film - Young Actress Age Ten or Younger ===
★ Raquel Castro - Jersey Girl - Miramax

- Kara and Shelby Hoffman - Lemony Snicket's A Series of Unfortunate Events - Paramount/DreamWorks

=== Best Performance in a Feature Film - Young Ensemble Cast ===
★ Finding Neverland - Miramax

Freddie Highmore, Joe Prospero, Nick Roud and Luke Spill

- Motocross Kids - Tag Entertainment

Josh Hutcherson, Bobby Preston, Alexa Nikolas and Wayne Dalglish

- Sleepover - MGM

Sara Paxton, Mika Boorem, Sean Faris, Scout Taylor-Compton, Kallie Flynn Childress, Brie Larson, Evan Peters, Hunter Parrish, Douglas Smith, Katija Pevec, Eileen April Boylan and Ryan Slattery

== Best Performance in an International Feature Film ==
=== Best Performance in an International Feature Film - Leading Young Performer ===
★ Yannick van de Velde - In Oranje (Netherlands)

- Katie Boland - Some Things That Stay (Canada)
- Marc Donato - The Blue Butterfly (Canada)
- Jean-Baptiste Maunier - Les Choristes (France)
- Andrea Rossi - Le Chavi di Casa (Italy)
- Yūya Yagira - Nobody Knows (Japan)

== Best Performance in a Short Film ==
=== Best Performance in a Short Film ===
★ Madison Ford - Swan Dive - Voyager Films

- Will Bell - 17 Inch Cobras - Independent
- Jillian Clare - Chasing Daylight - AFI
- Jason Dolley - Chasing Daylight - AFI
- Megan McKinnon - Samantha's Art - Independent
- Hailey Anne Nelson - 17 Inch Cobras - Independent

== Best Performance in a TV Movie, Miniseries or Special ==
=== Best Performance in a TV Movie, Miniseries or Special - Leading Young Actor ===
★ Cody Arens - Plainsong - CBS

- Dan Byrd - 'Salem's Lot - TNT
- David Dorfman - A Wrinkle in Time - ABC
- Dominic Scott Kay - Single Santa Seeks Mrs. Claus - Hallmark
- Anton Yelchin - Jack - Showtime

=== Best Performance in a TV Movie, Miniseries or Special - Leading Young Actress ===
★ Danielle Panabaker - Searching for David's Heart - ABC Family

- April Mullen - Cavedweller - Showtime
- Keke Palmer - The Wool Cap - Hallmark
- Hayden Panettiere - Tiger Cruise - Disney Channel
- AnnaSophia Robb - Samantha: An American Girl Holiday - WB
- Shailene Woodley - A Place Called Home - Hallmark

=== Best Performance in a TV Movie, Miniseries or Special - Supporting Young Actor ===
★ Joseph Marrese - Lives of the Saints - CTV

- Alexander Conti - When Angels Come to Town - CBS
- Zac Efron - Miracle Run - Lifetime
- Brock Everitt-Elwick - The Lost Prince - PBS
- Mick Hazen - Plainsong - CBS
- Daniel Williams - The Lost Prince - PBS

=== Best Performance in a TV Movie, Miniseries or Special - Supporting Young Actress ===
★ Olivia Ballantyne - Samantha: An American Girl Holiday WB

- Genevieve Buechner - Family Sins - CTV
- Bianca Collins - Tiger Cruise - Disney Channel
- Dani Goldman - The Kids Who Saved Summer - Showtime
- Miriam McDonald - She's Too Young - Lifetime

== Best Performance in a TV Series ==
=== Best Performance in a TV Series (Comedy or Drama) - Leading Young Actor ===
★ (tie) Jack DeSena - All That - Nickelodeon
★ (tie) Logan Lerman - Jack & Bobby - WB

- Tyler Hoechlin - 7th Heaven - WB
- Jamie Johnston - Wild Card - Lifetime
- Malcolm David Kelley - Lost - ABC
- Jesse McCartney - Summerland - WB
- Romeo Miller - Romeo! - Nickelodeon
- Adamo Ruggiero - Degrassi: The Next Generation - CTV

=== Best Performance in a TV Series (Comedy or Drama) - Leading Young Actress ===
★ Kay Panabaker - Summerland - WB

- Andrea Bowen - Desperate Housewives - ABC
- Alyson Michalka - Phil of the Future - Disney Channel
- Sara Paxton - Darcy's Wild Life - Discovery Kids
- Scarlett Pomers - Reba - WB
- Emma Roberts - Unfabulous - Nickelodeon

=== Best Performance in a TV Series (Comedy or Drama) - Supporting Young Actor ===
★ Jason Dolley - Complete Savages - ABC

- Noel Callahan - Romeo! - Nickelodeon
- Oliver Davis - Rodney - ABC
- Evan Ellingson - Complete Savages - ABC
- Aubrey Graham - Degrassi: The Next Generation - CTV
- Cody Kasch - Desperate Housewives - ABC
- J. Dhylan Meyer - Everwood - WB

=== Best Performance in a TV Series (Comedy or Drama) - Supporting Young Actress ===
★ (tie) Christina Schmidt - Degrassi: The Next Generation - CTV
★ (tie) Alia Shawkat - Arrested Development - FOX

- Danielle Bouffard - Doc - PAX
- Vivien Cardone - Everwood - WB
- Megan Fox - Hope & Faith - ABC
- Sarah Ramos - American Dreams - NBC

=== Best Performance in a TV Series (Comedy or Drama) - Young Actor Age Ten or Younger ===
★ Zane Huett - Desperate Housewives - ABC

- Ethan Dampf - American Dreams - NBC
- Noah Gray-Cabey - My Wife and Kids - ABC
- Mitch Holleman - Reba - WB
- Matthew Josten - Rodney - ABC
- Frankie Ryan Manriquez - Life with Bonnie - ABC

=== Best Performance in a TV Series (Comedy or Drama) - Young Actress Age Ten or Younger ===
★ Darcy Rose Byrnes - The Young and the Restless - CBS

- Taylor Atelian - According to Jim - ABC
- Billi Bruno - According to Jim - ABC
- Conchita Campbell - The 4400 - USA
- Dee Dee Davis - The Bernie Mac Show - FOX
- Jodelle Ferland - Kingdom Hospital - ABC
- Kali Majors - ER - NBC

=== Best Performance in a TV Series (Comedy or Drama) - Guest Starring Young Actor ===
★ Christopher Malpede - That's So Raven - Disney Channel

- Loren Berman - Without a Trace - CBS
- Alex Black - CSI: Miami - CBS
- Cameron Bowen - Judging Amy - CBS
- Cody Estes - Navy NCIS - CBS
- Carter Jenkins - Everwood - WB
- Andrew Michaelson - Judging Amy - CBS
- Cole Peterson - Oliver Beene - FOX

=== Best Performance in a TV Series (Comedy or Drama) - Guest Starring Young Actress ===
★ Alix Kermes - Kevin Hill - UPN

- Danielle Churchran - Crossing Jordan - NBC
- Jennette McCurdy - Strong Medicine - Lifetime
- Erica Mer - Medical Investigation - NBC
- Katelin Petersen - Judging Amy - CBS
- Cassie Steele - Doc - PAX
- Tessa Vonn - Threat Matrix - ABC
- Aria Wallace - Strong Medicine - Lifetime

=== Best Performance in a TV Series (Comedy or Drama) - Recurring Young Actor ===
★ Cameron Monaghan - Malcolm in the Middle - FOX

- Spencer Achtymichuk - The Dead Zone - USA
- Oliver Davis - E.R. - NBC
- J. B. Gaynor - The George Lopez Show ABC
- Christopher Gerse - Days of Our Lives - NBC
- Carter Jenkins - Unfabulous - Nickelodeon
- Austin Majors - NYPD Blue - ABC
- Rory Thost - Phil of the Future - Disney Channel

=== Best Performance in a TV Series (Comedy or Drama) - Recurring Young Actress ===
★ Jillian Clare - Days of Our Lives - NBC

- Kay Panabaker - Phil of the Future - Disney Channel
- Alex Rose Steele - Degrassi: The Next Generation - CTV
- Scout Taylor-Compton - The Guardian - CBS
- Keaton and Kylie Rae Tyndall - The Bold and the Beautiful - CBS
- Brittney Wilson - Romeo! - Nickelodeon

=== Outstanding Young Ensemble Performers in a TV Series ===
★ That's So Raven - Disney Channel

Orlando Brown, Kyle Massey, Anneliese van der Pol, Raven-Symoné

- All That - Nickelodeon

Chelsea Brummet, Ryan Coleman, Lisa Foiles, Christina Kirkman, Shane Lyons, Giovonnie Samuels, Jack DeSena, Jamie Lynn Spears, Kyle Sullivan

- Degrassi: The Next Generation - CTV

Ryan Cooley, Jake Epstein, Stacey Farber, Aubrey Drake Graham, Miriam McDonald, Adamo Ruggiero, Christina Schmidt, Alex Rose Steele, Cassie Steele, Sarah Barrable Tishauer

- Unfabulous - Nickelodeon

Jordan Calloway, Bianca Collins, Dustin Ingram, Carter Jenkins, Malese Jow, Emma Roberts, Brandon Mychal Smith, Chelsea Tavares

== Best Performance in a Voice-Over Role ==
=== Best Performance in a Voice-Over Role - Young Artist ===
★ Tajja Isen - Atomic Betty - Cartoon Network

- Patrick Alan Dorn - Teacher's Pet - Disney
- Spencer Fox - The Incredibles - Disney/Pixar
- Taylor Masamitsu - Higglytown Heroes - Disney Channel
- Matt Weinberg - The Lion King 1½ - Disney
- Brittney Wilson - Polly and the Pockets - Mattel

== Best Family Entertainment ==
=== Best Family Television Movie or Special ===
★ Miracle Run - Lifetime

- Plainsong - Hallmark
- Prodigy - WB
- Samantha: An American Girl Holiday - WB
- Searching for David's Heart - ABC Family
- The Winning Season - TNT

=== Best Family Television Series (Drama) ===
★ Jack & Bobby - WB

- 7th Heaven - WB
- American Dreams - NBC
- Summerland - WB

=== Best Family Television Series (Comedy) ===
★ Reba - WB

- All That - Nickelodeon
- Complete Savages - ABC
- Darcy's Wild Life - NBC
- Rodney - ABC
- Still Standing - CBS

=== Best Short Film Starring Youth ===
★ Chasing Daylight - AFI

- Samantha's Art - Independent
- 17 Inch Cobras - Independent
- Swan Dive - Voyager Films

=== Best International Feature Film ===
★ In Oranje - Netherlands

- The Blue Butterfly - Canada
- Les Choristes (The Chorus) - France
- Le Chiavi Di Casa (The Keys to the House) - Italy
- Yesterday - South Africa

=== Best Family Feature Film - Animation ===
★ The Incredibles - Disney/Pixar

- Home on the Range - Disney
- Shrek 2 - DreamWorks Skg
- The SpongeBob SquarePants Movie - Nickelodeon

=== Best Family Feature Film - Comedy or Musical ===
★ Christmas with the Kranks - Columbia

- Jersey Girl - Miramax
- Lemony Snicket's A Series of Unfortunate Events - Paramount/DreamWorks
- The Phantom of the Opera - Warner Bros.
- Sleepover - MGM
- Spanglish - Columbia

=== Best Family Feature Film - Drama ===
★ Finding Neverland - Miramax

- Catch That Kid - 20th Century Fox
- Friday Night Lights - Universal
- Garden State - Fox Searchlight
- In Good Company - Universal
- National Treasure - Disney

== Special awards ==
=== Outstanding Young Rock Musician ===
★ Antonio Pontarelli - Rock Violinist (California)

=== Outstanding Young Entertainment Journalist ===
★ Angela Riccio - Journalist / Feature Writer

=== Outstanding Young Performance in Theater ===
★ Darian Weiss - 'Young Patrick' in Auntie Mame

=== Outstanding Young Ensemble in a New Medium ===
==== Young Motion Performance Capture and Voice Artists ====
★ The Polar Express

Jimmy Bennett, Josh Hutcherson, Dante Pastula, Daryl Sabara, Dylan Cash, Connor Matheus, Isabella Peregrina, Eve Sabara (Note: Originally credited as Evan Sabara; Eve came out as a trans woman in 2020.), Ashly Holloway, Hayden McFarland, Jimmy 'Jax' Pinchak, Chantel Valdivieso

=== Jackie Coogan Award ===
==== Contribution to Youth Through Motion Pictures ====
★ The Polar Express - Warner Brothers Pictures

=== Michael Landon Award ===
==== Contribution to Youth Through Television ====
★ Raven-Symoné - That's So Raven - Disney Channel
