= Evan Peters =

American actor (born 1987)

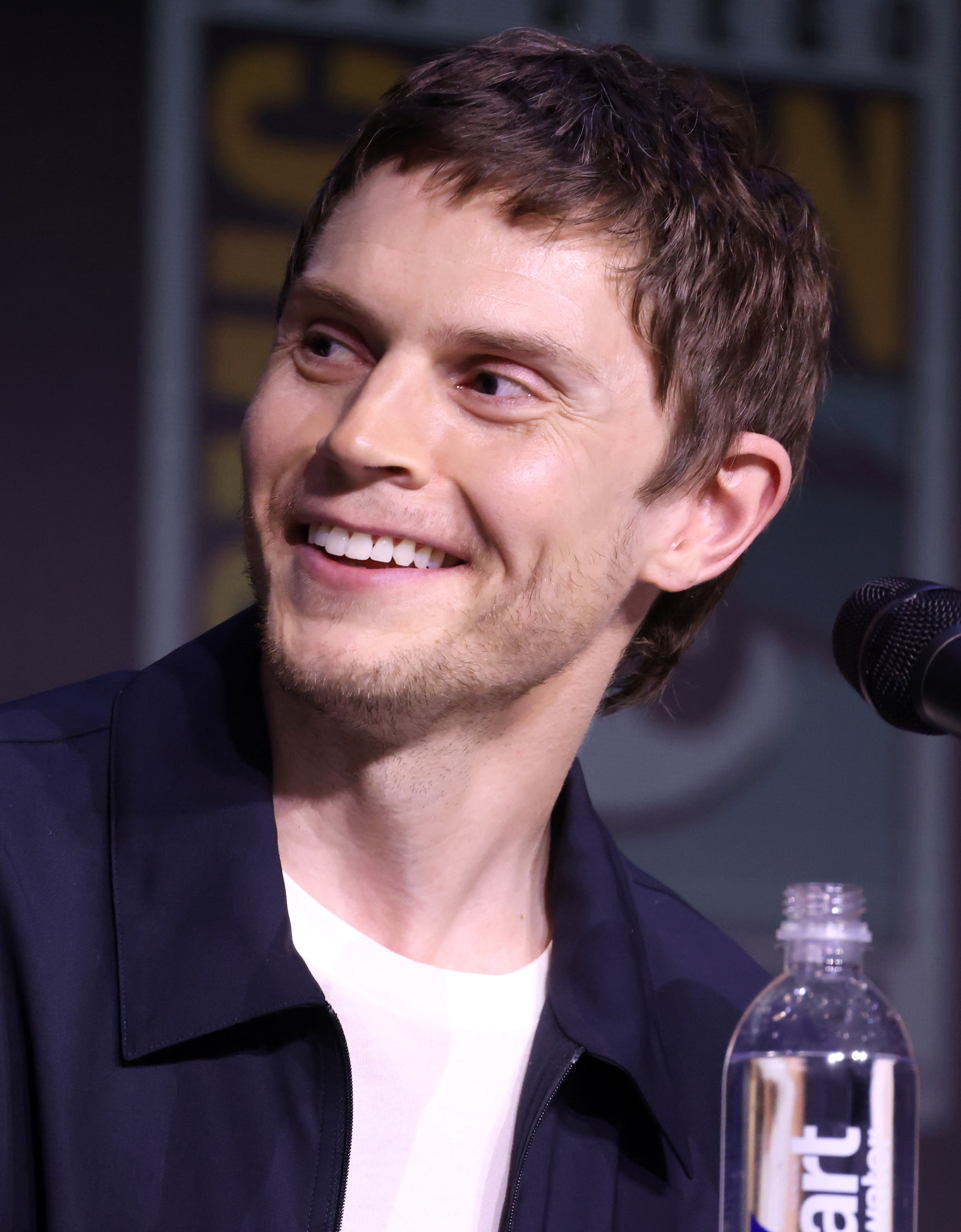
- Peters in 2025
- Born: Evan Thomas Peters; January 20, 1987 (age 39); St. Louis, Missouri, U.S.
- Occupation: Actor
- Years active: 2004–present
- Known for: American Horror Story

Evan Thomas Peters (born January 20, 1987) is an American actor. He made his acting debut in the 2004 drama film Clipping Adam and starred in the ABC science fiction series Invasion from 2005 to 2006. Peters gained wide recognition for playing multiple roles over ten seasons in Ryan Murphy's FX anthology series American Horror Story, from 2011 to 2026.

His performance as a detective in the HBO crime miniseries Mare of Easttown (2021) won him a Primetime Emmy Award for Outstanding Supporting Actor. For portraying the titular character in Murphy's Netflix miniseries Dahmer – Monster: The Jeffrey Dahmer Story (2022), he won a Golden Globe Award for Best Actor and was nominated for a Primetime Emmy Award for Outstanding Lead Actor.

In film, Peters has played a supporting role in the superhero film Kick-Ass (2010), and Peter Maximoff / Quicksilver in the X-Men film series (2014–2019). He also received a nomination for the BIFA for Best Supporting Actor for playing a rebellious student in the heist film American Animals (2018).

== Early life ==
Evan Thomas Peters was born in St. Louis, Missouri, to parents Julie (née DeWald) and Phillip Peters, and raised in the suburb of Ballwin. His father is a vice president of administration for the Charles Stewart Mott Foundation. His parents are both of German ancestry. Peters was brought up Catholic attending a Catholic school. He has an older brother, Andrew, and an older paternal half-sister, Michelle.

In 2001, Peters moved with his family to Grand Blanc, Michigan, where he pursued modeling and took local acting classes. He attended Grand Blanc High School, before moving to Los Angeles at age 15 with his mother to pursue his acting career. He attended Burbank High School as a sophomore, but later began homeschooling classes.

== Career ==
=== 2004–2010: Career beginnings and Kick-Ass ===
At his second audition, Peters was chosen for the role of Adam Sheppard in the film Clipping Adam. He then performed in television commercials for PlayStation and Sour Patch Kids.

In 2004, he starred in the MGM film Sleepover as Russell "SpongeBob" Hayes, and appeared in the ABC series The Days as Cooper Day. From 2004 to 2005, he had a recurring role as Seth Wosmer in the first season of the Disney Channel series Phil of the Future. From 2005 to 2006, he portrayed Jesse Varon in the ABC sci-fi thriller series Invasion.

Peters then had supporting roles in the films An American Crime (2007), Gardens of the Night (2008), Never Back Down (2008), and its sequel Never Back Down 2: The Beatdown (2011). He has also starred in several theater plays, including playing Fagin in a production of Oliver Twist at the Met Theater. In 2008, he had a recurring role as Jack Daniels on The CW teen-drama series One Tree Hill. In addition, he landed many one episode guest spots in television series such as The Mentalist, House, Monk, The Office, In Plain Sight, and Parenthood.

In 2010, he appeared in the supporting role of Todd Haynes, the main character's best friend, in the superhero film Kick-Ass. Peters was unable to reprise his role in the 2013 sequel due to scheduling conflicts with his role in the second season of American Horror Story.

=== 2011–present: American Horror Story, Quicksilver and Dahmer ===
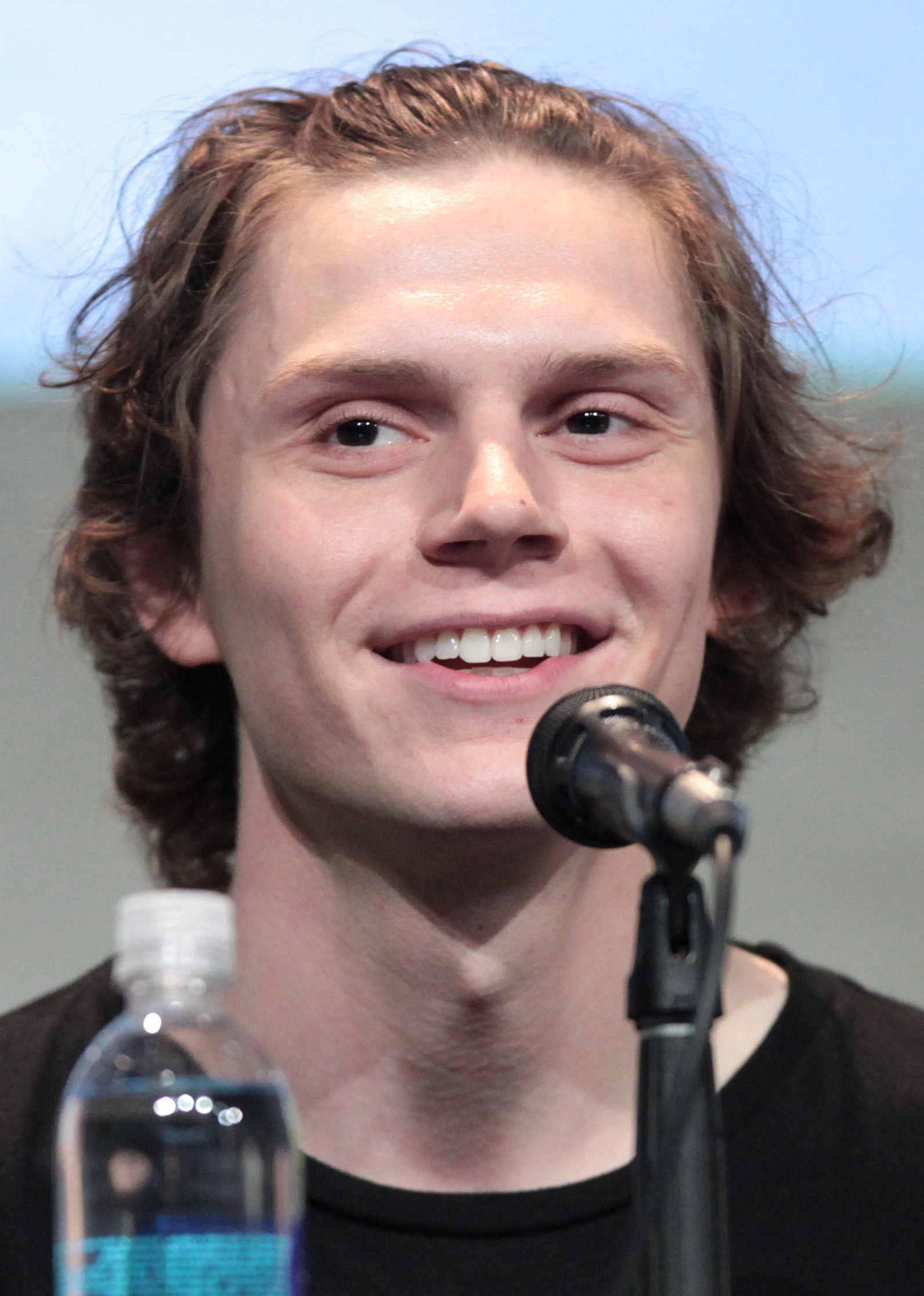
Peters at the 2015 San Diego Comic-Con

Peters' breakthrough role was playing the teenager Tate Langdon in the first season of the FX anthology series American Horror Story. In the second season, subtitled Asylum, he starred as Kit Walker, a man wrongly accused of killing his wife; this role earned him a nomination for the Satellite Award for Best Supporting Actor – Series, Miniseries or Television Film.

In the third season, subtitled Coven, he portrayed Kyle Spencer, a frat boy who is killed and brought back to life as a Frankenstein's monster type of creature. In the fourth season of the series, subtitled Freak Show, he played Jimmy Darling, a circus performer with deformed hands.

In 2014, Peters starred in the independent comedy film Adult World, opposite John Cusack and Emma Roberts. Peters played the mutant Peter Maximoff, based on Quicksilver, in the 2014 film X-Men: Days of Future Past and its 2016 sequel, X-Men: Apocalypse. In 2015, Peters starred in the horror film The Lazarus Effect, the drama film Safelight, alongside Juno Temple, and played the role of a wealthy oil businessman and serial killer named James Patrick March in the fifth season of American Horror Story, subtitled Hotel. In 2016 he had a role in the comedy-drama Elvis & Nixon and dual characters Edward Philipe Mott and Rory Monahan in American Horror Story: Roanoke.

2017 saw Peters play the lead in The Pirates of Somalia and earn a Critics' Choice nomination for his performance on American Horror Story: Cult. The next year, Peters played the lead in the heist film American Animals, collaborated once again with Ryan Murphy by acting in the first season of the FX drama Pose, ending the year with the portrayal of several characters in the American Horror Story crossover season, subtitled Apocalypse.

In 2019, he reprised the role of Quicksilver in the sequel film Dark Phoenix. Following The Walt Disney Company's purchase of 21st Century Fox, all X-Men related characters were transferred back to Marvel Studios. In 2021, Peters made a surprise appearance in the Disney+ series WandaVision, portraying an alternate version of his character from the X-Men film series, later revealed to be an imposter named Ralph Bohner. Also that year, Peters starred in Mare of Easttown, an HBO miniseries about a troubled police detective, for which he won the Primetime Emmy Award for Outstanding Supporting Actor in a Limited or Anthology Series. The end of the year saw Peters return to the American Horror Story universe, playing writer and entertainer Austin Sommers in the first part, Red Tide, of the tenth season.

In September 2022, Peters portrayed serial killer Jeffrey Dahmer in the Ryan Murphy created Netflix miniseries, Dahmer – Monster: The Jeffrey Dahmer Story. In June 2023, it was announced that Peters had joined the cast of Tron: Ares. In November 2023, Peters voiced Simon in the Walt Disney Animation Studios film Wish.

In January 2026, Peters reunited with Ryan Murphy for the FX science fiction body horror series The Beauty, starring as FBI agent Cooper Madsen. Peters also served as an executive producer on the series.

== Personal life ==
In 2012, Peters began dating actress Emma Roberts, whom he met on the set of the film Adult World. In 2013, while the couple was staying at a hotel in Montreal, Canada, at around 2:00 a.m. on July 7, someone overheard a dispute coming from their room and called the police. After interviewing witnesses and both occupants of the hotel suite, officers took Roberts into custody. Officers allegedly noticed Peters had a bloody nose and a bite mark. Peters did not want to press charges and Roberts was released several hours later. In a joint statement, the couple called it "an unfortunate incident and misunderstanding", and stated that they were "working together to move past it". Peters confirmed in March 2014 that he and Roberts were engaged. In March 2019, it was announced that Peters and Roberts had ended the relationship.

== Filmography ==
=== Film ===
Year	Film	Role	Notes	Ref.
2004	Clipping Adam	Adam Sheppard		
2004	Sleepover	Russell "SpongeBob" Hayes		
2007	An American Crime	Ricky Hobbs		
2007	Tough Cookie	Cookie Scout	Short film	
2008	Remarkable Power	Ross		
2008	Gardens of the Night	Brian / Rachel		
2008	Never Back Down	Max Cooperman		
2010	Kick-Ass	Todd Haynes		
2011	Never Back Down 2: The Beatdown	Max Cooperman		
2011	The Good Doctor	Donny Nixon		
2014	Adult World	Alex		
2014	X-Men: Days of Future Past	Peter Maximoff / Quicksilver		
2015	The Lazarus Effect	Clay		
2015	Safelight	Charles		
2016	Elvis & Nixon	Dwight Chapin		
2016	X-Men: Apocalypse	Peter Maximoff / Quicksilver		
2017	The Pirates of Somalia	Jay Bahadur		
2018	American Animals	Warren Lipka		
2018	Deadpool 2	Peter Maximoff / Quicksilver	Cameo	
2019	Dark Phoenix	Peter Maximoff / Quicksilver		
2019	I Am Woman	Jeff Wald		
2023	Wish	Simon	Voice	
2025	Tron: Ares	Julian Dillinger		
2026	A Statement	Rafe Pomerance	Completed	

=== Television ===
Year	Title	Role	Notes
2004	The Days	Cooper Day	Main role
2004–2005	Phil of the Future	Seth Wosmer	Recurring role (season 1)
2005–2006	Invasion	Jesse Varon	Main role (season 1)
2008	Dirt	Craig Hope	Episode: "God Bless the Child"
2008	Without a Trace	Craig Baskin	Episode: "A Bend in the Road"
2008	Monk	Eric Tavela	Episode: "Mr. Monk and the Genius"
2008	House	Oliver	Episode: "Last Resort"
2008–2009	One Tree Hill	Jack Daniels	Recurring role (season 6)
2009	Off the Clock	Jew	Episode: "Gorgonzola y Pinto"
2009	Ghost Whisperer	Dylan	Episode: "Excessive Forces"
2010	Criminal Minds	Charlie Hillridge	Episode: "Mosley Lane"
2010	The Mentalist	Oliver McDaniel	Episode: "18-5-4"
2010	The Office	Luke Cooper	Episode: "Nepotism"
2011	Parenthood	Brandon	Episode: "New Plan"
2011	In Plain Sight	Joey Roston / Joey Wilson	Episode: "Crazy Like a Witness"
2011	American Horror Story: Murder House	Tate Langdon	Main role
2012–2013	American Horror Story: Asylum	Kit Walker	Main role
2013–2014	American Horror Story: Coven	Kyle Spencer	Main role
2014–2015	American Horror Story: Freak Show	Jimmy Darling	Main role
2015	China, IL	Clint	Voice; episode: "Magical Pet"
2015–2016	American Horror Story: Hotel	James Patrick March	Main role
2016	American Horror Story: Roanoke	Edward Philipe Mott / Rory Monahan	Main role
2017	American Horror Story: Cult	Kai Anderson / Andy Warhol / Marshall Applewhite / David Koresh / Jim Jones / Jesus / Charles Manson	Main role
2018	Pose	Stan Bowes	Main role
2018	American Horror Story: Apocalypse	Mr. Gallant / James Patrick March / Tate Langdon / Jeff Pfister	Main role
2021	WandaVision	Ralph Bohner / "Pietro Maximoff"	Recurring role (4 episodes)
2021	Marvel Studios: Assembled	Himself	Episode: "The Making of WandaVision"
2021	Mare of Easttown	Colin Zabel	Main role
2021	American Horror Story: Double Feature	Austin Sommers	Main role; also producer
2022	Dahmer – Monster: The Jeffrey Dahmer Story	Jeffrey Dahmer	Main role; also executive producer
2024	Agatha All Along	Ralph Bohner	Episode: "Familiar by Thy Side"
2026	The Beauty	Cooper Madsen	Main role
2026	American Horror Story: 13	Kai Anderson / Tate Langdon / James Patrick March	Main role

=== Video games ===
Year	Title	Role	Notes	Ref.
TBA	Bradley the Badger	Bradley	Voice	

=== Music videos ===
Year	Title	Artist	Director
2024	"We Can't Be Friends (Wait for Your Love)"	Ariana Grande	Christian Breslauer

== Awards and nominations ==
Organizations	Year (Note: Indicates the year of the ceremony. Where available, this is linked to the article for that ceremony.)	Category	Work	Result	Ref.
Astra TV Awards (Note: Previously Hollywood Critics Association TV Awards.)	2021	Best Supporting Actor in a Limited Series, Anthology Series, or Television Movie	Mare of Easttown	Won	
Astra TV Awards	2023	Best Actor in a Limited Series, Anthology Series, or Television Movie	Dahmer – Monster: The Jeffrey Dahmer Story	Won	
British Independent Film Awards	2018	Best Supporting Actor	American Animals	Nominated	
Critics' Choice Super Awards	2023	Best Actor in a Horror Series, Limited Series or Made-for-TV Movie	Dahmer – Monster: The Jeffrey Dahmer Story	Won	
Critics' Choice Television Awards	2018	Best Actor in a Movie/Limited Series	American Horror Story: Cult	Nominated	
Critics' Choice Television Awards	2022	Best Supporting Actor in a Movie/Miniseries	Mare of Easttown	Nominated	
Fangoria Chainsaw Awards	2016	Best Supporting Actor on Television	American Horror Story: Hotel	Nominated	
Golden Globe Awards	2023	Best Actor – Limited Series, Anthology Series or Television Motion Picture	Dahmer – Monster: The Jeffrey Dahmer Story	Won	
Nickelodeon Kids' Choice Awards	2017	#Squad (Note: Shared with James McAvoy, Michael Fassbender, Jennifer Lawrence, Nicholas Hoult, Tye Sheridan, Ben Hardy, Kodi Smit-McPhee, Sophie Turner, Alexandra Shipp and Olivia Munn.)	X-Men: Apocalypse	Nominated	
Phoenix Film Festival	2004	Best Breakthrough Performance	Clipping Adam	Won	
Primetime Emmy Awards	2021	Outstanding Supporting Actor in a Limited or Anthology Series or Movie	Mare of Easttown	Won	
Primetime Emmy Awards	2023	Outstanding Lead Actor in a Limited or Anthology Series or Movie	Dahmer – Monster: The Jeffrey Dahmer Story	Nominated	
Primetime Emmy Awards	2023	Outstanding Limited or Anthology Series (as executive producer)	Dahmer – Monster: The Jeffrey Dahmer Story	Nominated	
Producers Guild of America Awards	2023	Outstanding Producer of Limited or Anthology Series Television	Dahmer – Monster: The Jeffrey Dahmer Story	Nominated	
Satellite Awards	2012	Best Supporting Actor – Series, Miniseries or Television Film	American Horror Story: Asylum	Nominated	
Satellite Awards	2022	Best Supporting Actor – Series, Miniseries or Television Film	Mare of Easttown	Won	
Satellite Awards	2023	Best Actor – Miniseries or Television Film	Dahmer – Monster: The Jeffrey Dahmer Story	Won	
Saturn Awards	2018	Best Supporting Actor on Television	American Horror Story: Cult	Nominated	
Screen Actors Guild Awards	2022	Outstanding Performance by a Male Actor in a Television Movie or Limited Series	Mare of Easttown	Nominated	
Screen Actors Guild Awards	2023	Outstanding Performance by a Male Actor in a Television Movie or Limited Series	Dahmer – Monster: The Jeffrey Dahmer Story	Nominated	
Teen Choice Awards	2016	Choice Movie: Scene Stealer	X-Men: Apocalypse	Nominated	
Young Artist Awards	2005	Best Performance in a Feature Film – Young Ensemble Cast (Note: Shared with Sara Paxton, Mika Boorem, Sean Faris, Scout Taylor-Compton, Kallie Flynn Childress, Brie Larson, Hunter Parrish, Douglas Smith, Katija Pevec, Eileen April Boylan and Ryan Slattery.)	Sleepover	Nominated	
