= Shadow Mountain High School =

Public school in Phoenix, Arizona

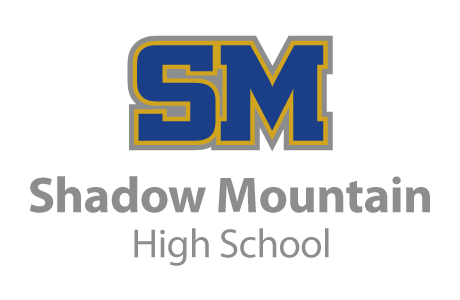

Location
- 2902 E. Shea Blvd. Phoenix, Arizona, U.S. 33°35′02″N 112°01′11″W

Information
- Type: Public high school
- Established: 1974
- School district: Paradise Valley Unified School District
- Superintendent: James Lee
- Principal: Heidi Banuelos
- Teaching staff: 70.50 (on an FTE basis)
- Grades: 9–12
- Enrollment: 1,148 (2023–2024)
- Student to teacher ratio: 16.28
- Colors: Navy Blue & gold
- Athletics conference: 4A Skyline
- Nickname: Matadors
- Feeder schools: Shea Middle School (all), Greenway Middle School (partial)
- Website: Official website

Shadow Mountain High School is a public high school located in the north valley of Phoenix, Arizona. The school is part of the Paradise Valley Unified School District. The school's athletic teams are known as the Matadors. Shadow Mountain's school colors are navy blue and gold. It opened in 1974.

== History ==
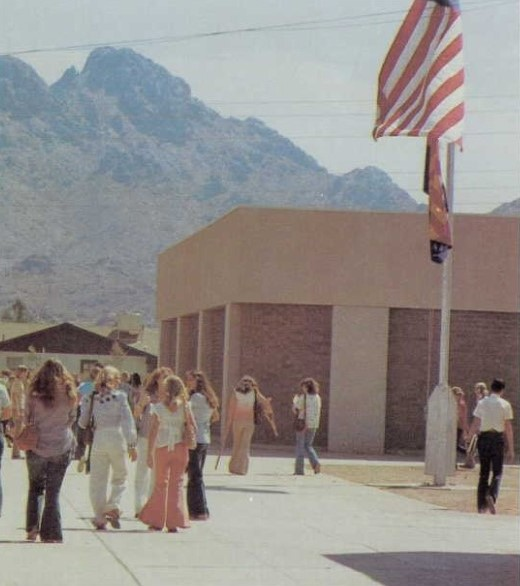
Shadow Mountain High School in 1976

Shadow Mountain opened in the fall of 1974 with 4 buildings. Guirey, Srnka, Arnold & Sprinkle were the architects. Robert N. Ewing was the general contractor who built the original 4 buildings. The school's auditorium was built in 1983. Matador Arena, the school’s secondary gymnasium, was built in 1996. A new classroom building was built in 2008.

Shadow Mountain is in the 4A Skyline athletic conference.

== Extracurricular activities ==
=== Band ===
Shadow Mountain High School boasts the largest music program in the Paradise Valley Unified School District. Most notably, the SMHS Marching Matadors finished the 2006 competitive marching season with several caption awards and having earned three Superior awards over the course of the season, with their King Kong marching showing. In 2006 they finished the season earning a Superior with Distinction at the state competition, the highest rating attainable in the ABODA Marching Circuit. The Matadors performance of their show "Music for a Darkened Theater: The music of Danny Elfman" received captions in Visual Performance, Music Performance, General Effect, Percussion, and Music General Effect.

In 2016, the Marching Matadors performed their field show, "Oliver Twisted" which contained music from the musical "Oliver!" They scored a rating of Superior at the ABODA State Marching Band Festival and 4th place at the ABODA State Marching Band Championships. They also performed in the 46th Annual Fiesta Bowl Parade and the 64th Annual Parada del Sol Parade, receiving a 3rd place award along with a rating of "Best Marching Band", respectively.

The Marching Matadors also participated in the 75th Anniversary of Pearl Harbor Parade in December 2016 in Honolulu, Hawaii. They were chosen to represent the USS Arizona that sank during the Attack on Pearl Harbor. In addition to performing in the parade, the Marching Matadors also played on the USS Missouri for a tribute performance.

=== Academic Decathlon ===
The Shadow Mountain Academic Decathlon team hosted the Arizona Region II competition on February 2–3, 2007. The team beat out 28 other schools and took first place with 39,200 points, narrowly defeating South Mountain High School. The team tied for first place in the 2008 regional Super Quiz Competition.

=== SFJROTC ===
Shadow Mountain also has an SFJROTC (Space Force Junior Reserve Officers' Training Corps).

== Athletics ==
Shadow Mountain's main athletic strengths are in cross country; track and field; basketball, and swimming.

=== Swim and dive ===
Misty Hyman (Olympic Gold Medalist) swam for Shadow Mountain.

=== Baseball ===
Two former Matador players are now coaching in the major leagues. Scott Emerson is the pitching coach for the Oakland Athletics and Greg Sparks is the assistant hitting coach for the Chicago White Sox.

=== Cross Country ===
The Shadow Mountain Cross Country teams have combined five state championships, three for the girls and two for the boys. The boys team won its state titles in 2001 and 2006. The years between, before, and after state titles have been successful, as well. The girls team's won the 1986, 1987, and 1988 Arizona state championships.

=== Track & Field ===
In 1999 former NFL player Shaun McDonald set the school record for the 100-meter dash at a time of 10.55. He also has the school's 200-meter record at the time of 21.48.

=== Basketball ===
Shadow Mountain Basketball has won state championships on the men's side in 1996, 1999, 2014, 2016, 2017, 2018, & 2019. The Girls won the state championship in 2011 & 2019. Mike Bibby, who went to Shadow Mountain and played in the NBA, coached the boys basketball team at Shadow Mountain from 2014 to 2019.

== Notable alumni ==
- Mike Bibby, former NBA player
- Mark Brnovich, Arizona Attorney General
- Scott Emerson, Major League Baseball pitching coach
- Misty Hyman, gold medalist Olympic swimmer, former coach of the Shadow Mountain High School swim team
- Curt Schilling, former pitcher for Philadelphia Phillies, Arizona Diamondbacks, and Boston Red Sox
- Marc Kroon, former Major League and Japanese League pitcher, drafted 72nd overall by New York Mets in 1991
- Tory Nixon, former NFL football player for San Francisco 49ers
- Shaun McDonald, football player
- Robbie Findley, soccer player for Nottingham Forest
- Buddy Rice, race car driver and 2004 Indianapolis 500 winner
- Amy Davidson, actress on TV series 8 Simple Rules
- Ryan Slattery, actor in film and TV, most notably for Sleepover
- Antonio Reeves, basketball player
- Ashley Roberts, former member of Pussycat Dolls and finalist on Series 16 of Strictly Come Dancing
