= Meaghan Martin =

American actress and singer (born 1992)

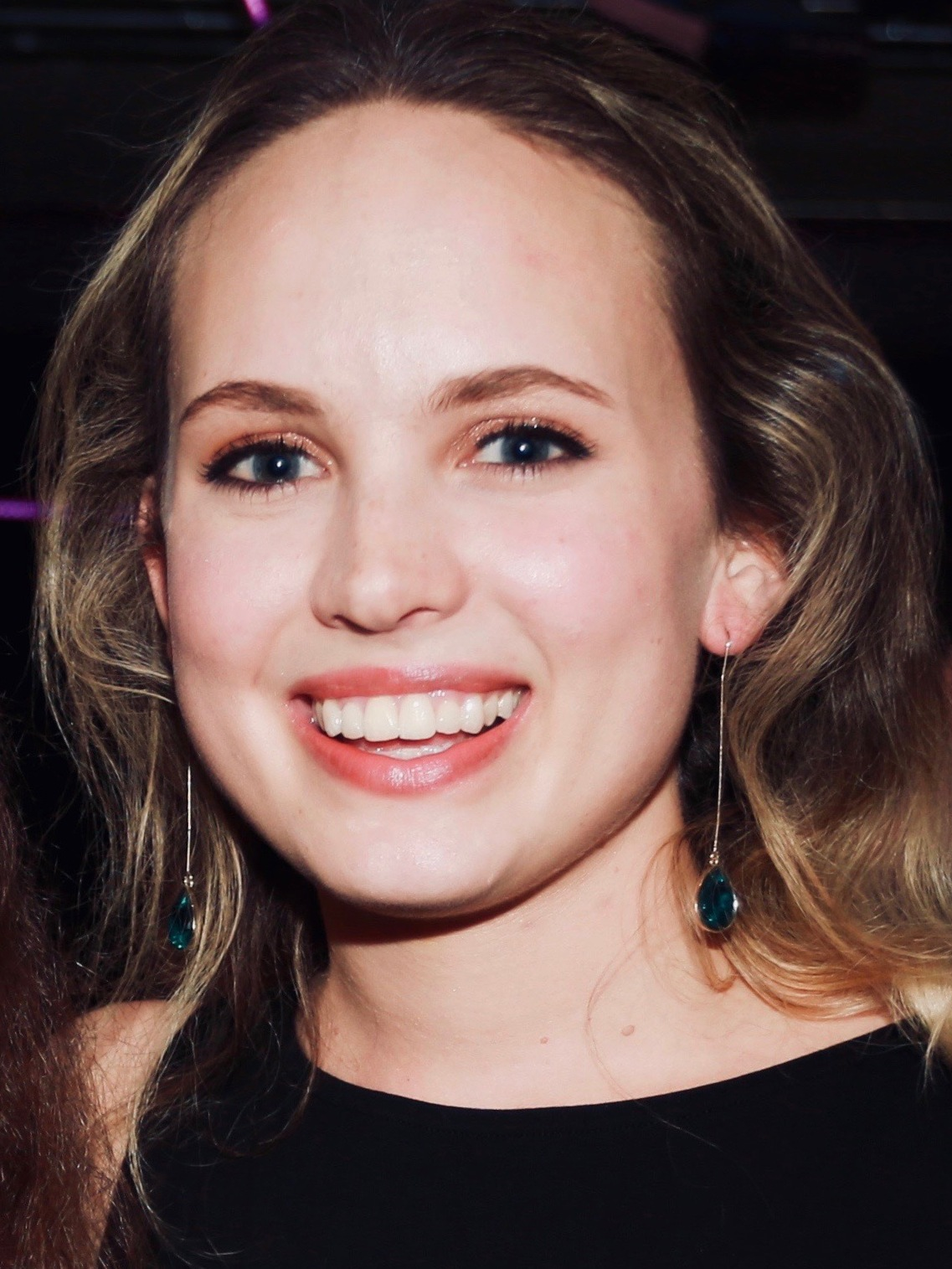
- Martin in 2019
- Born: Meaghan Jette Martin; February 17, 1992 (age 34); Las Vegas, Nevada, U.S.
- Education: London Academy of Music and Dramatic Art
- Occupations: Actress; singer
- Years active: 2007–present
- Height: 1.64 m (5 ft 5 in)
- Spouse: Oli Higginson (m. 2016)

Meaghan Jette Martin (/ˈmeɪɡən/) (born February 17, 1992) is an American actress and singer best known for her work in film, television, and theatre. She is best known for her starring role in the ABC Family television series, 10 Things I Hate About You as Bianca Stratford. She is also well known for her role as Tess Tyler in the Disney Channel television films Camp Rock and its sequel Camp Rock 2: The Final Jam. She has also had guest starring roles in House and Jessie, and played the recurring role of Julie #2 in Awkward. Martin also starred as Jo Mitchell in Mean Girls 2. Martin is also known for voicing Naminé in the video game series Kingdom Hearts and Jessica in Until Dawn. In 2019, Martin made her professional London stage debut in The Actor's Nightmare at the Park Theatre in London.

== Early life ==
Martin appeared in several community theater productions in Las Vegas such as Peter Pan and performed for her Showteam and later made her professional theater debut as Kendra in the Los Angeles production of 13 by Jason Robert Brown, directed by Todd Graff.

== Acting ==
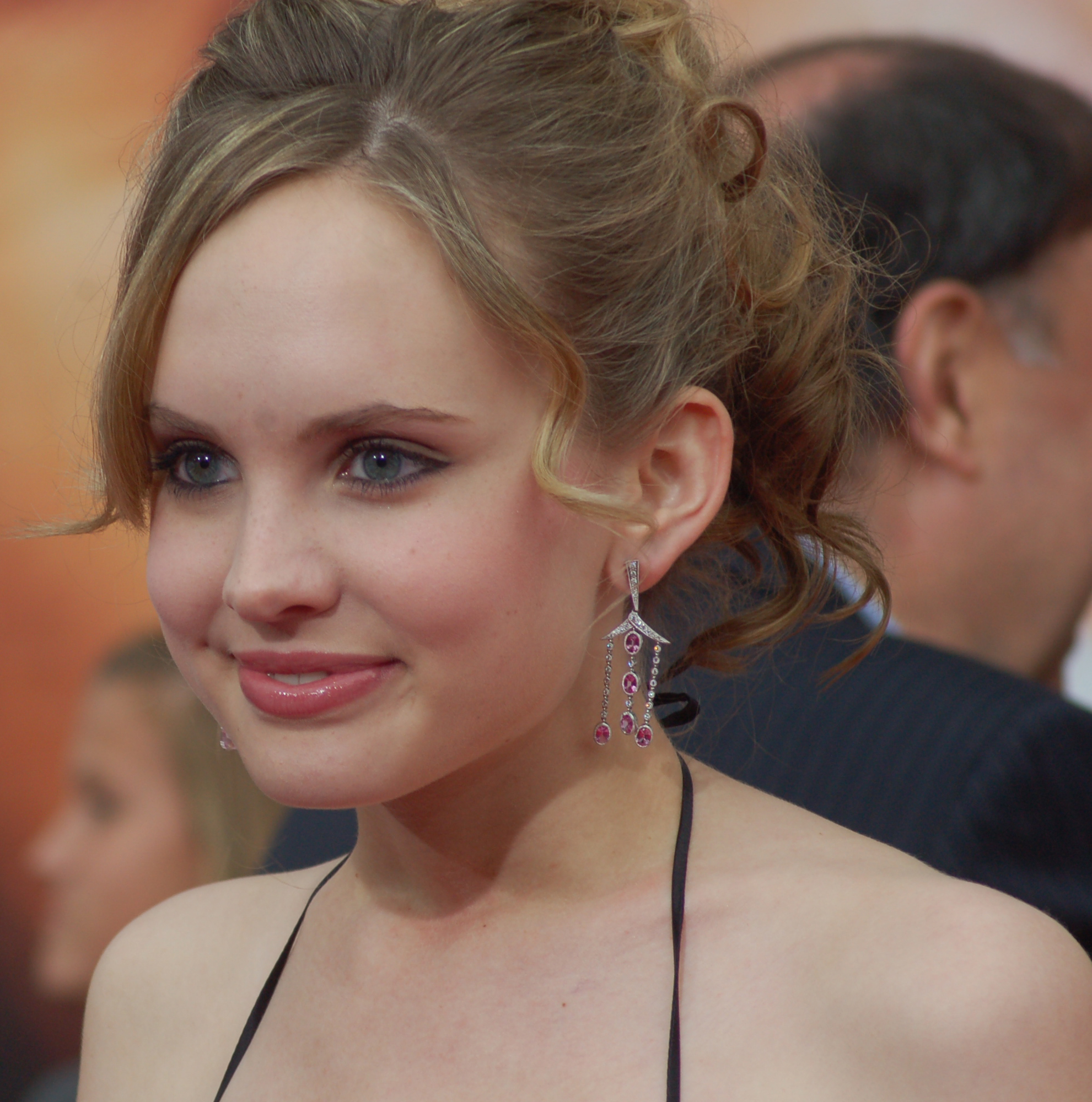
Martin in 2009

Martin started her acting career in 2007, in television programs such as Nickelodeon's Just Jordan and CBS's Close to Home, as well as a guest stint in the Disney Channel series The Suite Life of Zack & Cody. Martin was eventually cast as the lead antagonist Tess Tyler in the Disney Channel original film, Camp Rock, starring Demi Lovato and the Jonas Brothers. Martin was selected by TV Guide in 2008, as one of the "13 Hottest Young Stars to Watch". She was the online host for the 2008 Disney Channel Games.

Martin voiced the character Naminé in all releases in the Kingdom Hearts series following Kingdom Hearts II, replacing Brittany Snow. Martin starred in the ABC Family sitcom 10 Things I Hate About You as Bianca (originated by Larisa Oleynik in the film version) and received rave reviews for her performance in the series. Mike Hale of The New York Times described Meaghan as "the high point of an excellent ensemble". She also played the role of Megan Kennedy in the independent film Dear Lemon Lima which received the Audience Award for Best Narrative Feature at the Woodstock Film Festival. Martin returned to reprise her role as Tess Tyler in Camp Rock 2: The Final Jam, premiered on September 3, 2010, on Disney Channel. In 2011, Martin played the main character Jo Mitchell in the television film Mean Girls 2, the sequel of the 2004 film Mean Girls. Martin also played the role of Aubrey in the feature film Sironia.

On June 16, 2011, Martin appeared for one night in Super Summer Theatre's live production of "Annie" at Spring Mountain Ranch in Las Vegas, Nevada, in the role of Star-To-Be. Martin is also starring in the web series Wendy as the title character alongside Tyler Blackburn. Wendy is a dark twist on 'Peter Pan'. The series premiered on macys.com on September 15, 2011. In 2013, Martin appeared in the film adaptation Geography Club as Trish, earning a nomination for Best Performance by an Actress in a Leading Role at L.A. Outfest. Entertainment Tonight wrote "Every year sees the release of one film so culturally important it should be required viewing. This year, that film is Geography Club".

Later in 2013, she appeared in the thriller The Good Mother which aired on Lifetime Channel and was cast as Julie #2 in MTV's Awkward, replacing Sophie Tilson. Martin voiced and motion-captured the character of Jessica in the PlayStation 4 exclusive Until Dawn opposite Rami Malek and Peter Stormare.

Played the role of Sharon opposite Evan Peters and Juno Temple in the drama feature film Safelight, written and directed by Tony Aloupis.

Martin trained as an actor in London, England. In September 2016 she graduated from the London Academy of Music and Dramatic Art (LAMDA). After re-locating permanently to the UK, it was announced on April 9, 2019, that Martin would make her professional London stage debut in The Actor's Nightmare by Tony award-winning playwright Christopher Durang. The show is a dark satire exploring the entertainment industry. She starred in the world premiere production which played at London's Park Theatre, July 16 – August 10, 2019. The show received mixed reviews, though Martin received unanimously positive reviews for her performance, with The Stage writing "Meaghan Martin - best known for film work - makes a strong stage debut here, nailing her part as a stand-up comic desperate for approval, wincing anxiously every time her laugh track plays". Michael Billington of The Guardian called Martin's performance "Chilling", writing: "Meaghan Martin plays, with a marvellous mix of ingratiation and panic, a collapsing standup who pleadingly asks: 'Do you find me funny or disturbing?' On a lighter note, Martin also appears to great effect as a Hollywood hustler meeting a dithering dramatist".

Martin starred in award-winning short films Wives of the Landed Gentry and British political satire Bad News which premiered at the 2020 London Independent Film Festival at Vue Cinema West End. Martin played Henrietta in the video game Kosmokrats with actor Bill Nighy. Martin also appeared in Naked Times directed by Jake Kuhn, premiering at the Cannes Straight 8 Film Festival.

In December 2020, Martin played Lucy in the LGBTQ+ drama radio series Hell Cats for Audible, directed by Kate Saxon, alongside Adetomiwa Edun, Jonathan Bailey, and Erin Doherty. The series was a Critics Pick for The Sunday Times. Martin filmed the short Before Seven directed by the Ray Sisters, starring in the lead role of Sage in the film.

In March 2021, Martin played Julie in a reading workshop of the play Smoke by Kim Davies, at the Arcola Theatre in London. The play is a modern adaptation of Miss Julie exploring sexual consent at a BDSM party in New York. Martin starred in the 1950s drama short Tap Twice.

In January 2022, it was announced that Martin would star in the UK premiere of the play Never Not Once at the Park Theatre running through February and March 2022, in a cast including Flora Montgomery and Amanda Bright. The play is written by Carey Crim and directed by Katharine Farmer. Martin plays Eleanor, who is described as "bright, funny and completely happy apart from one small thing: she wants to know who her father is". The play is a "searing new drama about the families we choose and the secrets that can pull them apart" and was the winner of the Jane Chambers Award for Feminist Writing and Eugene O'Neil Award in America.

Never Not Once received positive 4 and 5 star reviews from critics including The Guardian, WhatsOnStage, The Upcoming, and London Theatre. The Guardian called the play "Gut-wrenching, weighty and forceful - a visceral interrogation of the lasting effects and consequences of rape". The Upcoming said "This is a play for our time, the topics it discusses resonate in every corner of society". Critics praised Martin's "superbly acted" performance. Everything Theatre called Martin "spine-tingling and uncomfortably brilliant" and The Arts Desk praised a "pitch-perfect Meaghan Martin". London Theatre wrote "Eleanor is very believably acted by Meaghan Martin with a terrific sense of energy and disbelief at the havoc she has unleashed by her quest for the truth". WhatsOnStage described Eleanor as "imbued with irresistible warmth and energy by Meaghan Martin".

In March 2022, it was announced that Martin would star in Ten Dates, a sequel to Five Dates, alongside Rosie Day, Rhiannon Clements, and Sagar Radia. Filming began in April 2022, with the game releasing in February 2023.

Martin starred as Julie in the London première of the play Smoke by Kim Davies at the Southwark Playhouse in February 2023. The production was produced by Katy Galloway Productions and featured Martin's real-life partner Oli Higginson in the opposite role of John. Smoke is a modern adaption of August Strindberg's Miss Julie set at a BDSM party in New York City, and was co-directed by Polina Kalinina and Júlia Levai. The play is described as a "piercingly witty and sometimes painful exploration of gender, sexuality and desire".

Smoke opened at Southwark Playhouse on February 1, 2023, to positive reviews from London critics, including 5 stars from The Arts Desk and Theatre News, and 4 stars from WhatsOnStage, Theatre Weekly, London Theatre Reviews, and Everything Theatre. In particular, Martin's performance was highly praised with WhatsOnStage writing "Higginson and Martin are delivering two of the most exciting performances on any current London stage". WhatsOnStage goes on to say "what makes Smoke rise from thought-provoking shocker to unmissable event, is the quality of the acting. Meaghan Martin and Oli Higginson are astonishing. Tender, brutal and utterly convincing, the measured sensuality of their movements contrasting intriguingly with line deliveries so naturalistic they sound like improvisation, this stunning pair mine Davies's text for all its dark humour and ambiguity." The Arts Desk 5 star review from critic Gary Naylor praised Davies' "dazzling Strindberg update" as a "complicated, clever and challenging play unafraid to treat its audience as grown-ups and all the more rewarding for that." Naylor writes that "the co-directors, Polina Kalinina and Júlia Levai are extremely adept at constructing this delicious set up and get super performances from their leads", before concluding that "Meaghan Martin, perfectly captures the coquettish bravado of Julie, that curdles into confusion, fear, and a cruelty both inflicted and endured."

In 2023, Martin starred in the feature film Journey alongside Rafael Cebrian, Arcelia Ramirez, and Gustavo Sanchez Parra.

In October 2025 it was reported in Variety that Martin was in Portugal filming the lead role in erotic thriller Red Flags, developing the story alongside writer/director Bradley Porter, and produced by Thomas McDonald for London-based Tedium Entertainment in a co-production with Staffan Tranaeus of SouthWest Productions in Portugal. Variety reported that the film follows a former child actress whose husband disappears on their European vacation, triggering a “ravenous journey of self-discovery driven by an insatiable appetite for sex, violence and pasteis de nata.” Producer McDonald said that the film is "a truly unique story that deconstructs the infantilisation of the media industry and a woman’s defiance of this structure to reclaim her sense of self and adulthood on her own terms. I can’t wait to bring this thrilling story and Meaghan’s incredible performance to the world.” In addition to Martin, the Red Flags cast includes Bert Seymour, Anatole Taubman, Roxanne Mesquida, Freddie Dennis, and Ana Cristina de Oliveira.

== Music ==
Martin recorded two songs in Camp Rock, "Too Cool" and "2 Stars". Martin sang a version of "When You Wish Upon a Star" for the 2009 re-release of Disney's Pinocchio, as well as appearing in the related music video. The song debuted at number fifty-two on Billboard's Hot Dance Club Songs chart, becoming her first and only chart single. It has since peaked at number thirty-seven.

Martin also recorded a version of the Olivia Newton-John song "Magic" for the Wizards of Waverly Place soundtrack. Martin has partnered with Build-A-Bear Workshop for their "Love.Hugs.Peace" movement. For the ad campaign, Martin recorded a special version of "Let's Talk About Love". Martin also recorded two songs in Camp Rock 2: The Final Jam, "Tear it Down" and "Walkin in My Shoes", alongside the Camp Rock co-star Matthew Finley. Martin also appear on the collaborative song "It's On", which features the co-stars of the film. All songs appear in the soundtrack of the film.

Martin appeared in the music videos "Remember December" by Demi Lovato and "It's On" by the cast of Camp Rock 2: The Final Jam. Martin did not join the Jonas Brothers: Live in Concert tour, with Lovato and the Camp Rock 2 cast, because she was filming Mean Girls 2.

== Personal life ==
Martin became engaged to British actor Oli Higginson in May 2016. They were married on September 24, 2016, in London, UK. Martin lives in East London.

== Filmography ==
=== Film ===
Year	Title	Role	Notes
2008	Camp Rock	Tess Tyler	Winner of Best Performance by an Actress in a TV movie at the Family Television Awards
2009	Dear Lemon Lima	Megan Kennedy	Audience Award winner for Best Narrative Feature at the Woodstock Film Festival; Nominated for Standout Performance at the Young Hollywood Awards
2010	Camp Rock 2: The Final Jam	Tess Tyler	Disney Channel Original Movie
2010	Privileged	Vera	
2011	Mean Girls 2	Jo Mitchell	Television film
2011	Sironia	Aubrey	Audience Award winner at the 2011 Austin Film Festival
2013	The Good Mother	Melanie	Television film
2013	Geography Club	Trish	Nominated for Best Performance by an Actress in a Leading Role at L.A. Outfest
2014	Senior Project	Natalia Bell	
2014	Time Does Not Pass	Girl	Short film
2015	Safelight	Sharon	
2019	Wives of the Landed Gentry	Lavinia	Short film; also producer
2020	Unstable Bitches	Grace	Short film
2020	Bad News	Gina	Premiered at the London Independent Film Festival
2020	Naked Times		Premiered at the Cannes Straight 8 Film Festival
2022	Before Seven	Sage	Short film
2022	Ten Dates		Feature Film
2023	Journey	Samantha	Feature Film
TBA	Tap Twice	Alice	Short film
TBA	Red Flags	Alyssa	Feature Film

=== Television ===
Year	Title	Role	Notes
2007	Just Jordan	Ashley	Episode: "Home Alone in the Diner"
2007	Close to Home	Candy	Episode: "Fall from Grace"
2007	The Suite Life of Zack & Cody	Stacey	Episode: "Sleepover Suite"
2008	Disney Channel's 3 Minute Game Show	Herself / Host	6 episodes
2008	Disney Channel Games	Herself / Online Host	5 episodes
2008	House	Sarah	Episode: "Joy to the World"
2008	Holly and Hal Moose: Our Uplifting Christmas Adventure	Easton (voice)	
2009–2010	10 Things I Hate About You	Bianca Stratford	Main role, 20 episodes
2011	Dr. Phil	Herself	Episode: "Mini Mean Girls"
2012	Wedding Band	Jenna	Episode: "I Love College"
2013	The Coppertop Flop Show	Herself	2 episodes
2013–2016	Awkward	Julie #2	Recurring role, 11 episodes
2014	Melissa & Joey	Jordan	2 episodes
2015	Jessie	Delphina / Kim	Episode: "Rossed at Sea"

=== Web ===
Year	Title	Role	Notes
2008	Jonas Brothers: Band In a Bus	Herself	Episode: "Video (Hometown) Girl"
2011	Wendy	Wendy	Series lead, 10 episodes
2018–2019	The Band Formerly Known As	Paige	6 episodes

=== Video games ===
Year	Title	Role	Notes
2008	Kingdom Hearts Re: Chain of Memories	Naminé	
2009	Kingdom Hearts 358/2 Days	Naminé	
2010	Kingdom Hearts Birth by Sleep	Naminé	
2011	Kingdom Hearts Re:coded	Naminé	
2013	Kingdom Hearts HD 1.5 Remix	Naminé	
2014	Kingdom Hearts HD 2.5 Remix	Naminé	
2015, 2024	Until Dawn	Jessica "Jess" Riley	Voice and motion capture
2018	The Crew 2	June Wilder	
2019	Kingdom Hearts III	Naminé	
2020	Kosmokrats	Henrietta	
2021	Battlefield 2042	Female	
2021	Triangle Strategy	Medina Alliam, Orlaea	
2022	Arknights	Hoshiguma, Quercus, Saileach	
2023	Xenoblade Chronicles 3: Future Redeemed	Linka	
2024	Stellar Blade	Enya	
2024	Wuthering Waves	Camellya	
2025	The Hundred Line: Last Defense Academy	Kako Tsukumo, Zen'ta	
2026	Resident Evil Requiem	FBI Agent, Civilian	

=== Theatre ===
Year	Title	Role	Notes
2007	13	Kendra	Kirk Douglas Theatre
2016	'Tis Pity She's a Whore	Annabella	London Academy of Music and Dramatic Art
2016	Othello	Desdemona	London Academy of Music and Dramatic Art
2019	The Actor's Nightmare	Melissa	Park Theatre in London
2021	Smoke	Julie	Arcola Theatre in London (Workshop reading)
2022	Never Not Once	Eleanor	Park Theatre in London
2022	The Least We Could Do	Charlie	The Other Palace in London
2023	Smoke	Julie	Southwark Playhouse in London

=== Radio ===
Year	Title	Role	Notes
2020	Hell Cats	Lucy	Directed by BAFTA award-winning director Kate Saxon The Sunday Times Critics Pick

== Discography ==
Year	Title	Notes
2009	"When You Wish Upon a Star"	Disneymania 6
2009	"Let's Talk About Love"	Build-A-Bear Workshop Promo
2010	"Walkin' In My Shoes" (with Matthew "Mdot" Finley)	Camp Rock 2: The Final Jam
2010	"Tear It Down" (with Matthew "Mdot" Finley)	Camp Rock 2: The Final Jam
2010	"It's On" (with the cast of Camp Rock 2: The Final Jam)	Camp Rock 2: The Final Jam
2011	"Meantime"	Sironia
2011	"I'm All Yours"	Sironia
2013	"Hate You"	Geography Club

=== Other appearances ===
Song	Year	Other artist(s)	Album
"We Rock"	2008	Cast of Camp Rock	Camp Rock
"Too Cool"	2008	—N/a	Camp Rock
"2 Stars"	2008	—N/a	Camp Rock
"Our Time Is Here"	2008	Demi Lovato; Aaryn Doyle	Camp Rock
"Magic"	2009	—N/a	Wizards of Waverly Place
"Walkin' In My Shoes"	2010	Matthew "Mdot" Finley	Camp Rock 2: The Final Jam
"Tear It Down"	2010	Matthew "Mdot" Finley	Camp Rock 2: The Final Jam

=== Other credits ===
Title	Year	Artist	Credit	Ref.
A Little Bit Longer	2008	Jonas Brothers	Vocals ("Video Girl")	

=== Music videos ===
==== As lead artist ====
Year	Title	Director	Ref.
2009	"When You Wish Upon a Star"	Brandon Dickerson	
2009	"Let's Talk About Love"	None	

==== Guest appearances ====
Year	Title	Artist(s)	Director	Ref.
2008	"We Rock" (Cast Video)	Cast of Camp Rock	None	
2008	"Start the Party"	Jordan Francis; Roshon Fegan	Eric Covert	
2009	"I Want You to Want Me" (10 Things I Hate About You version)	KSM	Declan Whitebloom	
2009	"Remember December"	Demi Lovato	Tim Wheeler	
2010	"It's On"	Cast of Camp Rock 2: The Final Jam	Brandon Dickerson	
2011	"Save Me"	Golden State featuring Tyler Blackburn	None	
2012	"Bad for You"	Midnight Mirage	John W. MacDonald	

== Awards ==
Year	Award	Category	Nominated work	Result
2008	Family Television Awards	Best Performance by an Actress in a TV Movie	Camp Rock	Won
2008	Popcorn Film Festival	Audience Award (Best TV Movie Actress)	Camp Rock	Won
2009	Young Hollywood Awards	Standout Performance	Dear Lemon Lima	Nominated
2010	Young Artist Awards	Best Performance by an Actress in a Supporting Role (Comedy or Drama)	10 Things I Hate About You	Nominated
2010	Popcorn Film Festival	Audience Award (Best TV Actress)	10 Things I Hate About You	Won
2010	Popcorn Film Festival	Female Newcomer		Nominated
2013	L.A. Outfest	Best Performance by an Actress in a Leading Role	Geography Club	Nominated
2014	Family Television Awards	Best Performance by an Actress in a TV Movie	The Good Mother	Won
2014	Young Hollywood Awards	Fan favorite Actress		Nominated
