= Smoke (2014 play) =

2014 play by Kim Davies

Smoke is a one-act play by American playwright and screenwriter Kim Davies. The two-hander play, set entirely in the kitchen of a New York City apartment, tells of the meeting of Julie and John, two young people at a BDSM sex party. As this privileged college student and jaded wannabe artist spark a connection, their cat-and-mouse power politics climax into a thrilling and disturbing climax with irreparable and unsettling consequences. Davies originally began with August Strindberg's Miss Julie as the inspiration for her modern drama, as well as her experiences of the BDSM scene in New York City during her time studying on Mac Wellman's MFA playwriting program at Brooklyn College. Davies started writing Smoke during her second year at Brooklyn College.

== Themes ==
Smoke explores themes of gender, power, complicity consent, and sexual assault. The New York Times says "the play gives us two self-possessed contemporary young New Yorkers in a kitchen at an uptown sex party" and describes the story as fundamentally "a man and a woman alone in a room, grappling with the overwhelming question of power — who holds it, and how it will be used — in an arena of escalating sexual tension." The play has been praised for moving the conversation around consent and sexual assault into more nuanced territory, as well as telling a story that takes BDSM seriously as a real practice; BDSM and kink has traditionally been treated with cynicism and disrespect, and not properly interrogated onstage and in the media. The play addresses issues of date rape culture in America where sexual assault became almost permissible amongst young people. Davies worked as an anti-rape activist within the BDSM community.

The play also explores a dysfunctional father-daughter relationship, toxic masculinity, class, and the challenges of pursuing a career in the arts where internships and creative 'opportunities' can border on the abusive and exploit young people desperate for a career as an artist.

Smoke has many similarities with Miss Julie, first and foremost the similarity in the characters' names - Julie and Jean in Miss Julie, Julie and John in Smoke. Similarly to Miss Julie, Smoke engages with under-explored conversations around gender roles, sex, power dynamics, and consent.

Davies sees Smoke as a development of the conversation around consent and complicity, and an attempt to dispel the myth of the 'perfect victim'. Unlike Strindberg's Miss Julie, Davies expands Julie's voice further and, despite the pain present in the story, allows Julie to find a form of empowerment by not being totally decimated by her experience in the way Strindberg's Julie takes her own life at the end of his play. Davies' Julie is a survivor.

== Productions ==
The play premiered at the Flea Theater in New York City, directed by Tom Costello and starring Madeleine Bundy and Stephen Stout, where it was the Critics' Pick of The New York Times and Time Out New York. In 2022, it was announced that Smoke would receive its London Premiere at the Southwark Playhouse in London directed by Polina Kalinina and Júlia Levai, and starring Oli Higginson and Meaghan Martin. There have also been well-received productions in Philadelphia at the Exile Theatre and at the Fringe Festival in Edinburgh in Scotland. In 2026, a translated production took place at Chulalongkorn University in Bangkok, Thailand.

Role	New York 2014	Philadelphia 2016	Los Angeles 2016	Edinburgh Fringe 2019	London 2023	Bangkok 2026
Julie	Madeleine Bundy	Merci Lyons-Cox	Emily Jones	Kristen Winters	Meaghan Martin	Pingtarn Sirinaphaphan
John	Stephen Stout	Matteo Scammell	Patrick Stafford	Vincent Santvoord	Oli Higginson	Wisarut Himaratana
Directed by	Tom Costello	Deborah Block	Lisa James	Simon Usher	Polina Kalinina & Júlia Levai	Natthakorn Julrasorn
