= Dakota Skye (film) =

2008 American coming-of-age drama film by John Humber

- Official movie poster
- Directed by: John Humber
- Written by: Chad Shonk
- Produced by: John Humber; Shaun O'Banion
- Starring: Eileen April Boylan; Ian Nelson; J.B. Ghuman Jr.
- Cinematography: Brett Juskalian
- Edited by: Jeff Castelluccio
- Music by: Seth Podowitz
- Distributed by: Desert Skye Entertainment
- Release date: March 14, 2008
- Running time: 89 minutes
- Country: United States
- Language: English

Dakota Skye (Lie To Me on Amazon Prime) is a 2008 coming of age drama directed and produced by John Humber, starring Eileen April Boylan, Ian Nelson, and J.B. Ghuman Jr. The film focuses on the eponymous main character, who has a supernatural ability to know when she is being lied to. Skye is forced to re-examine her own life after meeting someone who for the first time, never lies to her.

== Reviews ==
The film received mixed reviews. The film was featured at several film festivals, including San Luis Obispo Film Festival, Phoenix Film Festival, Charlotte Film Festival and Edmonton International Film Festival.

== Accolades ==
Writer Chad Shonk won the Copper Wing Award for Best Screenplay at Phoenix Film Festival 2008. Producer John Humber won the Festival Prize for Best Narrative Feature at Charlotte Film Festival 2008.
