= Johnny Palermo =

American actor (1982–2009)

- Palermo (right) and Tyler James Williams on Everybody Hates Chris
- Born: John Joseph Palermo; March 1, 1982; Rochester, New York, U.S.
- Died: June 8, 2009 (aged 27); North Hollywood, California, U.S.
- Occupation: Actor
- Years active: 2004–2009

John Joseph Palermo (March 1, 1982 — June 8, 2009) was an American television actor.

== Early life ==
A native of Rochester, New York, Palermo graduated from Webster High School in 2000. He is the son of John M. Palermo and Patricia A. Crawford and brother to Jennifer M. Alma and Rick F. Palermo. While there, he played football and was a member of the school's state championship team in 1999. Johnny also loved to make movies as a kid using his father's camera and anyone and anything he could find to star in his feature films. Palermo later attended the Art Institute of Pittsburgh, where he studied special-effects movie makeup.

== Career ==
In 2002, Palermo moved to Los Angeles to pursue his acting career. He subsequently appeared in more than 30 television shows. He had a recurring role on the Nickelodeon series Just for Kicks, and he had appeared in Everybody Hates Chris as Chris' overgrown classmate Frank DiPaolo.

== Death ==
On June 8, 2009, he and his girlfriend Alessandra Giangrande were both killed in an early morning car crash in North Hollywood, California. Giangrande was driving at the time. Palermo was 27 years old at the time of his death.

== Filmography ==
- Cold Case (2004, TV Series) as Ken Mazzacone (1978)
- Days of Our Lives (2005, TV Series) as Marine Medic
- Passions (2005, TV Series) as Jon #2
- General Hospital (2005-2007, TV Series) as Vinnie / Bus Boy
- Sissy Frenchfry (2005, Short) as Ross
- Without a Trace (2005, TV Series) as Uniformed Cop
- Sad Potato (2005)
- Campus Ladies (2006, TV Series) as T-Man - Frat Guy
- Slip (2006) - Gumbo
- Just for Kicks (2006, TV Series) as Evan Ribisi
- What About Brian (2006, TV Series) as Vendor #2
- Everybody Hates Chris (2006, TV Series) as Frank DiPaolo
- ER (2007, TV Series) as Officer Scanaloni
- CSI: NY (2008, TV Series) as Ronnie Hall
- How I Met Your Mother (2008, TV Series) as Cafe Guy
- CSI: Miami (2009, TV Series) as Louie Clayton
- Rules of Engagement (2009, TV Series) as Rocco
- Angel of Death (2009) as Leroy
- Pizza with Bullets (2010) as Young Don Vito (final film role; posthumous release)
