= Scott Emerson (baseball) =

American baseball player and coach (born 1971)

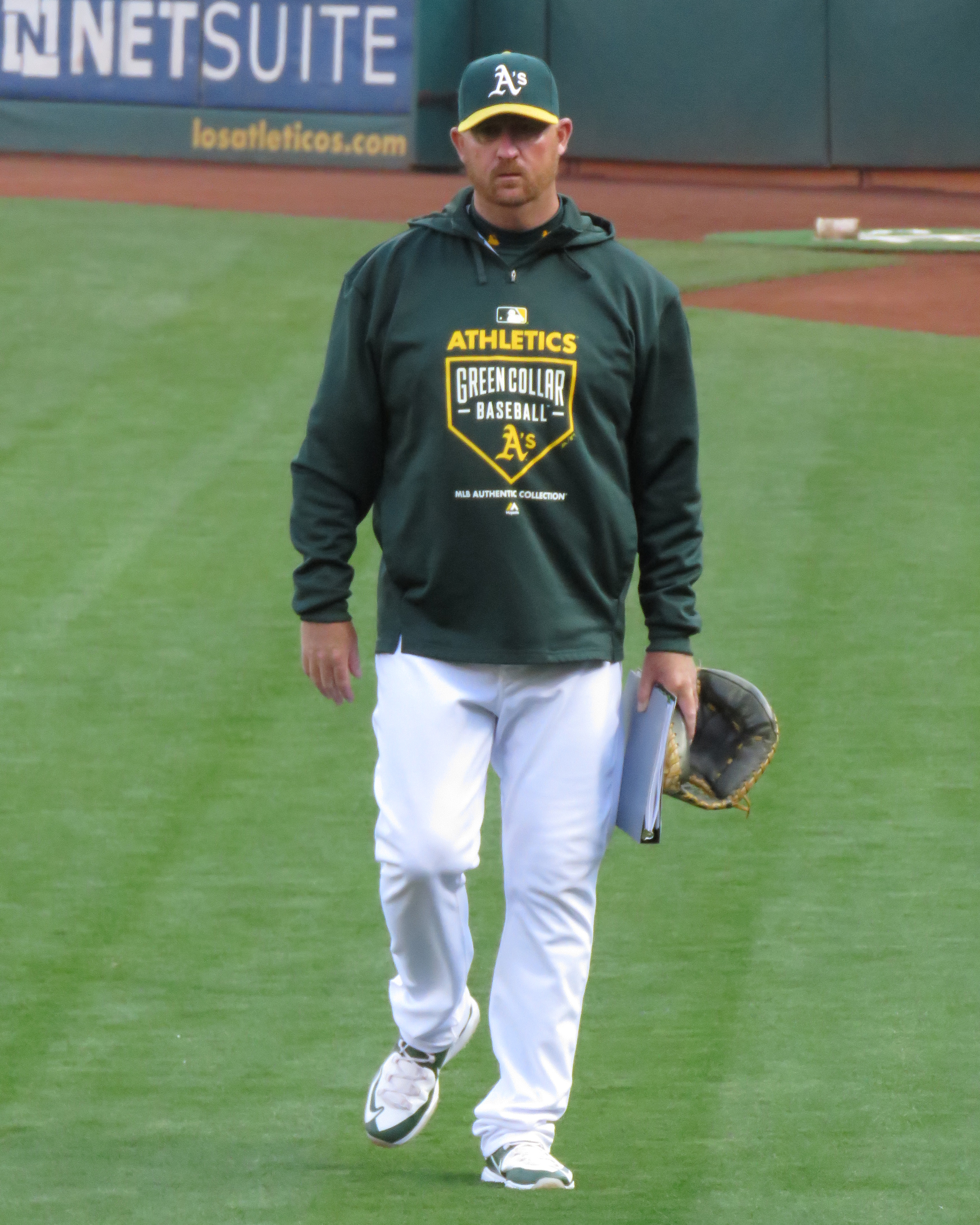
- Emerson with the Oakland Athletics in 2015
- Pitching coach
- Born: December 22, 1971 (age 54); Baltimore, Maryland, U.S.
- Bats: Both Throws: Left
- Stats at Baseball Reference

Teams
- As coach: Oakland Athletics / Athletics (2015–2026)

Scott Matthew Emerson (born December 22, 1971) is an American professional baseball coach and former pitcher. He most recently served as the pitching coach for the Athletics of Major League Baseball (MLB) from 2017 to 2026.

== Career ==
=== Playing career ===
Emerson attended Shadow Mountain High School in Phoenix, Arizona, and Scottsdale Community College in Scottsdale, Arizona. He was drafted by the San Diego Padres in the 21st round of the 1990 MLB draft from Shadow Mountain High School and the Baltimore Orioles in the 40th round of the 1991 MLB draft from Scottsdale Community College. A former left-handed pitcher, he played in minor league baseball from 1992 through 1997, spending the first three seasons of his career with the Orioles' organization, and in the Boston Red Sox's organization 1995 through 1996. In 1997, Emerson played in the independent Texas–Louisiana League for the Rio Grande Valley White Wings.

=== Coaching career ===
Emerson reached Double-A before beginning his coaching career. In 2000, Emerson joined the Pittsburgh Pirates organization as the pitching coach of the Gulf Coast League Pirates. In 2001, he was named Pitching Coach of their Single-A team, the Williamsport Crosscutters. He joined the Oakland Athletics minor league system as the pitching coach of the Modesto Athletics in 2002 where he spent two seasons. He spent 2005–2006 with the Stockton Ports and 2007–2010 with the Midland Rockhounds. He then spent two seasons in Triple-A with the Sacramento River Cats before being named the Minor League Pitching Coordinator in 2013.

Emerson has also coached internationally in the Mexican Pacific League with Cañeros de Los Mochis (2004) and the Phoenix Desert Dogs of the Arizona Fall League (2005).

After the 2014 season, the Athletics named Emerson their major league bullpen coach. He was promoted to the position of pitching coach on June 15, 2017.

On July 13, 2026, the Athletics dismissed Emerson as their Major League pitching coach.

== Personal life ==
Emerson married his wife, Jill, in 2001. They reside in North Carolina.

Since 2011, Emerson has traveled to Europe each year in the off-season to coach for Purpose-Driven Baseball in the Czech Republic and other European countries.
