= Just for Kicks (TV series) =

2006 American comedy-drama television series

- The main characters (clockwise from left to right), Vida, Freddie, Alexa and Lauren.
- Created by: Alana Sanko
- Developed by: Whoopi Goldberg
- Starring: Francesca Catalano; Mallory Low; Katija Pevec; Jessica Williams; Jerad Anderson
- Theme music composer: John Coda
- Opening theme: "Gonna Play Real Hard"
- Ending theme: "Gonna Play Real Hard"
- Composers: John Coda; Richard Bowers
- Country of origin: United States
- Original language: English
- No. of seasons: 1
- No. of episodes: 13

Production
- Executive producers: Whoopi Goldberg; Tom Leonardis; David Brookwell; Sean McNamara
- Running time: 22 minutes
- Production companies: Brookwell McNamara Entertainment; Lil' Whoop Productions

Original release
- Network: Nickelodeon
- Release: April 9 – August 13, 2006

Just for Kicks is an American comedy series that aired on the Nickelodeon television network as a part of the channel's TEENick television lineup. The series is about a group of girls on a soccer team set in New York City.

Created by Alana Sanko and developed by Whoopi Goldberg, the series was first titled Head to Toe, and then The Power Strikers, but its title was finally changed in 2005 to Just for Kicks. The series premiered in January 2006 on Nickelodeon UK, and in April 2006 on Nickelodeon in the United States. The series was produced by Brookwell McNamara Entertainment.

Just for Kicks aired for one season of thirteen episodes.

== Characters ==
=== Main ===
- Alexa D'Amico (Francesca Catalano) is a typical popular high school girl. She was a former cheerleader and she is fond of boys. She has an older brother, Chris. Towards the end of the series, her father gets laid off of his job, which causes some stress for her. Since Alexa started being a soccer player and she had to stop cheerleading her old, popular friends don't understand why she would rather run around on a muddy field than go shopping. She lives in Brooklyn.
- Winifred "Freddie" Costello (Mallory Low) is a tough girl in high school who is not good friends with Alexa because she and her friends are snobs to Freddie at their private school. Her father is always with the military, and she lives with her grandmother. She is also known for having severe cases of "bacne", or acne on her back. Freddie lives in Manhattan on the Upper East Side.
- Lauren Zelmer (Katija Pevec) is a shy, timid serious girl who is a good athlete. She is a typical schoolgirl who plays the violin and is on the soccer team, among other activities. Lauren is very intelligent, and is very busy with extracurricular activities, which causes her much stress. She has a big crush on Alexa's older brother Chris, and at the end of the season they start to date, much to Alexa's disbelief. Her overprotective mother works at a local private school, in which Lauren attends. Lauren lives in Harlem, Manhattan.
- Vida Atwood (Jessica Williams) is a sporty athletic serious girl, who has a lot in common with her soccer mate Lauren Zelmer. She has been playing soccer the longest, and is sort of the unofficial best at the game. She lives at home with her younger brother, older sister, and parents. Vida is self-conscious of her towering height, and it is known that she once beat up a boy back in first or second grade. She lives in Queens.
- Chris D'Amico (Jerad Anderson) is Alexa's older brother, he is an aspiring filmmaker and somewhat dimwitted.

=== Recurring ===
- Marni Nelson (Jessica Sara) is a Power Strikers teammate later turned team manager.
- Coach Leslie Moore (Craig Young) is the Power Strikers coach.
- Evan Ribisi (Johnny Palermo) is Chris' best friend who also works at the girls' local hangout the @itude Cafe.
- Courtney (Shelley Buckner) is Alexa's shallow best friend who doesn't like Alexa having interest in soccer.
- Dr. Charles Atwood (Kadeem Hardison) is Vida's dad.
- Mrs. Atwood (JoNell Kennedy) is Vida's mom.
- Ty Atwood (Leon Thomas III) is Vida's annoying little brother.
- Elise Atwood (Shani Pride) is Vida's older sister who is an aspiring model.
- Mrs. Zelmer (Jenica Bergere) is Lauren's overprotective mom.
- Lucy Costello (Amy Hill) is Freddie's grandmother who she is living with while her parents are overseas in the military.
- Dana Battle (Rinabeth Apostol) is the captain of the Power Strikers who spends every waking minute on the soccer field and is Vida’s foil. When she gets injured, she softens up to the rookies.

== Episodes ==
No.	Title	Directed by	Written by	Original release date	Prod. code
1	"Meet the Power Strikers"	Sean McNamara	Part 1: Alana Sanko; Part 2: Matt Dearborn	April 9, 2006	101
2	"Meet the Power Strikers"	Sean McNamara	Part 1: Alana Sanko; Part 2: Matt Dearborn	April 9, 2006	102
Alexa D'Amico, Freddie Costello, Lauren Zelmer and Vida Atwood, four teenage girls from different walks of life, all make the local girls soccer team, the Power Strikers. As teammates, Alexa and Freddie butt heads due to their different social classes in school. Vida stands up to Dana, the team captain. Lauren quickly develops a crush on Alexa's older brother, Chris.
3	"The Right Size"	Sean McNamara	Hilary Winston	April 16, 2006	105
The girls all become self-conscious about their body image: Alexa is concerned with growing hair above her upper lip, Freddie has back acne, Lauren is worried about her breast cup size and Vida is taller than a boy that she has been crushing on.
4	"Boys Do Cry"	Casey DeStefano	Steve Leff & Jim Patterson	April 23, 2006	103
Vida begins dating a boy who she later finds out she beat up back in elementary school. Freddie is too scared to use public restrooms.
5	"I'll Cry if I Want To"	Gregory Hobson	Alana Sanko	May 7, 2006	110
Vida hosts a slumber party to get the team ready for a game the next day. Vida's plans to eat healthy pasta and watch game film goes out the window, when the team would rather do regular slumber party things like watch television, play Charades and eat pizza. On the way to a costume party dressed in surgical doctor garb, Chris and Evan pretend to be real doctors to impress two older women. The Atwoods plan to surprise their Nana with a visit, but get lost in the road.
6	"I Love Lucy"	Casey DeStefano	Dawn DeKeyser	May 14, 2006	106
Freddie becomes jealous when Lauren and her grandma Lucy share similar interests and spend a lot of time together. Vida's little brother Ty develops a huge crush on Alexa.
7	"Freudian Kicks"	Sean McNamara	Bernie Ancheta	May 21, 2006	104
Vida accidentally hits Elise in the face with a soccer ball, ruining an upcoming modeling campaign for her, causing Vida to feel guilty. Chris has a major pimple problem and goes to Lauren for help.
8	"Sisters Before Misters"	David Brookwell	Hilary Winston	June 11, 2006	107
Alexa's ego gets slighted when a boy chooses to go out with Freddie over her. The Power Strikers are on a losing streak and Coach Moore goes to a self-help guru for help, who Lauren and Vida discover is a fraud.
9	"Out of Time"	David Brookwell	Bernie Ancheta	June 18, 2006	108
Lauren becomes overwhelmed with all of her extracurricular activities with her mother putting pressure on her to quit soccer. Alexa and Evan secretly plan on giving a birthday present to Chris, with Chris thinking that they are dating.
10	"We Aren't Family"	David Brookwell	Steve Leff & Jim Patterson	July 9, 2006	109
Vida wants Charles to attend more of her games, but when he starts doing so, he becomes another overbearing "stage dad". Chris is working on a film on the Power Strikers to show the team's booster club. However, with encouragement from Evan, Chris plans on embellishing the film with hysterics.
11	"Alexa in Charge"	David Brookwell	Bernie Ancheta & Hilary Winston	July 16, 2006	111
Alexa gets a part-time job at her uncle's Italian restaurant after her dad gets laid off from his job. Marni decides to quit the team and is later promoted to team manager.
12	"Waiting for Fleishman"	Paul Hoen	Bernie Ancheta & Hilary Winston	July 23, 2006	112
A talent scout for an Olympic developmental program chooses Vida to join, causing tension between her and Freddie. Alexa and Marni are worried about Coach Moore's romantic relationship interfering with the team's winning streak. Chris asks for Lauren's help to study for an upcoming exam, finally showing reciprocal romantic feelings for her.
13	"The Longest Yarn"	Paul Hoen	Matt Dearborn	August 13, 2006	113
Lauren and Chris' continued time alone together has Alexa concerned for her friend. Lauren's mother then finds out about the blossoming relationship and has her worried as well. Marni and Vida try to keep Freddie off her feet after she suffers a serious ankle injury.
