= Safelight (film) =

- Theatrical release poster
- Directed by: Tony Aloupis
- Written by: Tony Aloupis
- Produced by: Cory Neal; Bernie Gewissler; Tony Aloupis
- Starring: Juno Temple; Evan Peters; Kevin Alejandro; Meaghan Martin; Christine Lahti; Ariel Winter; Jason Beghe
- Cinematography: Gavin Kelly
- Edited by: Ed Marx
- Music by: Joel P. West
- Production companies: Aloupis Productions; Hacienda Film Co.
- Distributed by: ARC Entertainment
- Release dates: April 17, 2015 (Nashville); July 17, 2015 (United States)
- Running time: 83 minutes
- Country: United States
- Language: English

Safelight is a 2015 American drama film, written and directed by Tony Aloupis, and starring Juno Temple, Evan Peters, Kevin Alejandro, Jason Beghe, Ariel Winter, and Christine Lahti. The film had its world premiere on April 17, 2015 at the Nashville Film Festival.

The film was released in a limited release and through video on demand on July 17, 2015 by ARC Entertainment.

== Plot ==
Sometime in the 1970s, Vicki is getting roughed up at a truck stop by Skid, her narcissistic pimp. Charles, who had been working at the truck stop, comes outside with a bat telling Skid to leave her alone. Skid doesn't take Charles seriously but eventually drives off. Charles is a 17-year-old high school student who is bullied because of his physical disability, but finds solace in taking photographs.

Charles lives at home with his supportive father, Eric, who is dying. At the truck stop, Charles works for a witty middle-aged woman, Peg, who adores and encourages him. One day at school Charles's teacher, Mr. Sullivan, announces that a photography contest will be taking place. Intrigued, Charles takes a flyer. He considers entering the photography contest, but doesn't know what his theme will be.

Vicki is an 18-year-old prostitute who lives in a motel room near the truck stop. Vicki continued to put up with Skid, who always wants his cut of the money she makes from prostitution. Meanwhile, she keeps coming into the truck stop to talk to Charles between her sessions with various truck drivers. During one of his shifts Vicki notices the contest flyer and asks Charles if he is going to enter. He responds that he wants to take photos of the California lighthouses, but that he would need someone to drive him, due to his physical disability. Vicki then offers to drive Charles around to take pictures for the contest.

At the first lighthouse Charles tells Vicki that his mother abandoned him when he was young and that the camera he was using to take the photos belonged to his brother, Kevin, who was killed in Vietnam. In response, Vicki reveals that her father is dead and her mother kicked her out of the house. At the second lighthouse, Vicki further explains that her mother kicked her out of the house because she thought Vicki was messing around with one of her boyfriends, and that once she was on her own she met Skid.

Seeing that Charles and Vicki are getting closer, Peg invites her out to go dancing with her, Charles and a couple of her girlfriends, and Vicki agrees. During their night out, Vicki persuades Charles to slow dance with her, and the two share a kiss. Before Vicki and Charles go to the third lighthouse, Charles persuades Vicki to visit her family, but when they arrive Vicki receives a mixed reception from her sisters, Sharon and Kate. One day on his way to work, Charles bumps into Skid, Vicki's psychotic pimp, who shares his disdain towards women with Charles, which is rooted in the fact that he had a bad mother. At the fourth lighthouse, Vicki expresses to Charles how much she appreciates him and that she'll miss going to lighthouses with him.

Vicki and Charles stop by Vicki's family house for another visit. While looking through old photos, Kate tells Vicki that she is nothing but a whore, and Vicki leaves. Crying outside her family's home, Vicki becomes angry with Charles for persuading her to see her family again and tells him she only hung out with him because she felt sorry for him. Days go by, and Vicki stops talking to Charles and stays away from the truck stop. Meanwhile, Charles finally hands in his collection of photos for the contest, which he titles "Beacon of Light".

On his way home from school Charles runs into neighborhood bullies, who push him down and break his camera. While at work, Skid, who is showing symptoms of paranoia, asks Charles if he has seen Vicki lately. Charles tells Skid that he hasn't, and Skid leaves. Back at home, Charles and his dying father sit outside their home, and Charles's father tells him how much he loves him and that he is proud of the man he has become. He passes away a few moments later.

After the funeral, Peg tells Charles that she'll always be there for him. He ends up placing third in the photography contest. Skid eventually tracks down Vicki and waits for her in her motel room. Once she arrives, she asks Skid to leave, saying that she never stole from him. Skid throws a stack of money that Vicki was hiding from him in her face, punches her and pins her down on the bed.

Charles suddenly arrives and tells Skid to stop hurting Vicki. Skid and Charles get into a physical altercation, and Vicki grabs her gun and shoots Skid. The film ends with Charles and Vicki saying goodbye to one another before Vicki drives away, while Charles takes picture of her leaving the truck stop.

== Cast ==
- Evan Peters as Charles
- Juno Temple as Vicki
- Kevin Alejandro as Skid
- Meaghan Martin as Sharon
- Jason Beghe as Eric
- Ariel Winter as Kate
- Matthew Ziff as Kyle
- Don Stark as Jack Campbell
- Ever Carradine as Lois
- Christine Lahti as Peg
- Joel Gretsch as Mr. Sullivan
- Roma Maffia as Rose
- Gigi Rice as Lillian
- Will Peltz as Jason

== Production ==
In March 2012, Evan Peters and Juno Temple were cast in the two leading roles. The film was originally titled Truck Stop. In April 2012, Christine Lahti joined the cast as a character named Peg, Matthew Ziff joined the cast as Kyle, and Meaghan Martin was cast as Sharon.

== Marketing and release ==
On February 17, 2015, the first theatrical trailer was released for the film. Safelight had its world premiere at the Nashville Film Festival on April 17, 2015, and screened at the Newport Beach Film Festival on April 25, 2015. On June 4, 2015, it was announced ARC Entertainment had acquired distribution rights to the film and set a date for a limited release and video on demand release of July 17, 2015.

== Reception ==
On Rotten Tomatoes the film holds an approval rating of 0% based on 17 reviews, with an average rating of 3.3/10. On Metacritic, the film has a rating of 26 out of 100 based on 7 critics, indicating "generally unfavorable reviews". The Hollywood Reporter stated that in the film "a single dramatic cliche is missed" while Brian Tallerico of RogerEbert.com gave it a half star, criticizing everything about the film.
