= Oli Higginson =

English actor (born 1994)

- Born: 26 April 1994 (age 32); England
- Education: Charterhouse School
- Alma mater: University of Bristol; Guildhall School of Music and Drama
- Occupations: Actor; musician
- Years active: 2019–present
- Spouse: Meaghan Martin (m. 2016)
- Musical career
- Also known as: Modern Oli
- Genre: Indie pop
- Instruments: Vocal; Piano
- Label: AWAL

Oli Higginson (born 26 April 1994) is an English actor, writer and musician. He is best known internationally for his recurring role as Footman John on the Netflix period drama Bridgerton (2020–). His theatre work has included the role of Jamie in the West End production of The Last Five Years which earned him a Stage Debut Award nomination, and Cassio in Othello at Shakespeare's Globe for which he was nominated for an Ian Charleson Award. He writes and records music under the alter-ego Modern Oli.

== Early life and education ==
Higginson grew up in London, where he participated in school plays and sang in rock-bands as a teenager.

He studied at Charterhouse School before reading theology at the University of Bristol, and then attended the Guildhall School of Music and Drama where he graduated in 2019.

== Career ==
=== Acting ===
Soon after graduating from Guildhall, Higginson appeared in the World Premiere of The Haystack at Hampstead Theatre directed by then Artistic Director Roxana Silbert, and performed a small role on the Netflix show Cursed. He also played in a critically acclaimed production of The Last Five Years, a two-person-play, together with Molly Lynch performing 2020 in the Southwark Playhouse and 2021 in the Garrick Theatre, making his West End debut. He was nominated for a 2020 Stage Debut Award and the 2020 Offie for Best Lead Performance (Musical), and the production received numerous four and five star reviews. WhatsOnStage described this iteration of the piece as the "definitive production" with The New York Times remarking on an "excellent" Oli Higginson, The Daily Telegraph praising the show's "bravura performances", and The Stage commending the production's "superlative, visceral performances capturing the excitement of new love and the agony of divorce". The Independent wrote that "Higginson and Lynch are armed with a veritable boatload of talent and charisma – the megawatt, star-making kind that hits like a tidal wave." The production was filmed live and became available through BroadwayHD.

During this time, Higginson also played the role of Colin in Emily Mortimer's BBC Mini-Series The Pursuit of Love, appearing opposite Lily James. He then went on to star at The Old Vic alongside Stephen Mangan as Scrooge's Nephew Fred in Matthew Warchus' hit production of A Christmas Carol, written by Jack Thorne. WhatsOnStage wrote that "Oli Higginson radiates warmth and kindness as his jovial nephew" and London Theatre praised his performance for "deftly shifting gears after his hefty assignment as the male half of The Last Five Years".

In early 2022, Oli appeared in the London Premiere of James Fritz' four-hander play LAVA at Soho Theatre alongside Bethany Antonia and Kacey Ainsworth. LAVA then toured to Sheffield Crucible, Theatre Royal Bath, Birmingham Rep, Nottingham Playhouse, and Theatr Clwyd. Later that year he was seen playing Saul in the Sky Atlantic TV mini-series This England, a COVID-19 docudrama written and directed by Michael Winterbottom, which starred Kenneth Branagh as Boris Johnson.

In 2023, he returned to the Southwark Playhouse, doing the two-person-play Smoke together with his real-life partner Meaghan Martin. Smoke is a modern adaption of August Strindberg's Miss Julie set at a BDSM party in New York City, and was co-directed by Polina Kalinina and Júlia Levai. The play is described as a "piercingly witty and sometimes painful exploration of gender, sexuality and desire". The play received numerous four and five star reviews, with The Arts Desk praising the "exhilarating and dazzling Strindberg update" in their five-star review, and WhatsOnStage writing: "Meaghan Martin and Oli Higginson are astonishing. Tender, brutal and utterly convincing, the measured sensuality of their movements contrasting intriguingly with line deliveries so naturalistic they sound like improvisation, this stunning pair mine Davies’s text for all its dark humour and ambiguity. They also achieve a combustible sexual chemistry ... Higginson and Martin are delivering two of the most exciting performances on any current London stage".

Later on in 2023, Higginson was seen as Jack Felton in Season 2 of The Chelsea Detective, alongside Ella Bruccoleri and Adrian Scarborough. Higginson also appeared in the short film Treadmill, written and directed by Pierluigi Campa, and played Terry Sightworsens in the original concert production of I Wish You Well: The Gwyneth Paltrow Musical at the Turbine Theatre alongside Zizzi Strallen and Idriss Kargbo.

In 2024, he played Cassio in Ola Ince's modern-dress production of Othello, for which he was nominated for an Ian Charleson Award. Clive Davis in The Times writes "Of all, Higginson makes the strongest impression". Higginson was also seen in a guest star role on HBO's acclaimed television series Julia, playing Jacques Brel opposite Fiona Glasscot, in a cast including Sarah Lancashire, Isabella Rossellini, David Hyde Pierce, and Stockard Channing. His performance of Brel is the first ever portrayal of the renowned Belgian singer to be seen on screen since his death in 1978. Higginson also stepped into the role of 'Him' in the two-hander play After Sex, written by Siofra Dromgoole and directed by Izzy Parris at Arcola Theatre in Summer 2024. In March 2025, the short film Pipe Dream was released, in which Higginson stars as antagonist Danny alongside Louis Partridge, Anson Boon, and Liah O'Prey, directed by Misha Seresin.

Since 2020, Higginson has been seen in all three seasons of the hit Netflix series Bridgerton in the recurring role of John, a footman working for the eponymous family. He was recently featured in Netflix's 'first look photos' from the upcoming fourth season, which wrapped in May 2025.

In summer 2025, Higginson was cast as Claudio in the Shakespeare play Measure for Measure at the Royal Shakespeare Company in a cast including Adam James, Isis Hainsworth, Douggie McMeekin and Tom Mothersdale. Directed by Emily Burns, the production opened in September 2025 to rave reviews, including five stars in The Guardian and four stars in The Times, The Stage, The Daily Mail and The Daily Telegraph who called it a 'benchmark production'. The Guardian praised the 'superbly performed' production, Dominic Cavendish in The Telegraph commended 'Oli Higginson's condemned Claudio's stirring despair at impending mortality', and Stage Talk Magazine calls his performance 'Outstanding ... a major stage presence ... we get a forceful sense of his terror of death as he deliver's some of the play's greatest lines'. WhatsOnStage applauded Higginson's 'desperate Claudio' and North West End complimented his 'standout performance [in which] he takes an often sympathetically presented role and mires it in a deeply repugnant ditch of expressivity'. Libby Purves – former chief Critic of The Times – writes 'Isis Hainsworth’s Isabella is superb too, and her scene with Claudio – in his initially desperate attack of timor-mortis – is properly moving, until with rapid subtle self-delusion he suddenly manages to convince himself that a girl's virtue is, face it, unimportant next to a man's life. Oli Higginson does it with a horrid clarity'. The Daily Mail writes: 'the play runs like a thriller, driven by the fate of the doomed youth Claudio, played with escalating desperation by Bridgerton's Footman John, Oli Higginson'.

In December 2025, Higginson began rehearsals for American Psycho at the Almeida Theatre in London, in which he plays Timothy Price. Higginson joined the leading cast in Rupert Goold's final production as Artistic Director of the Almeida, alongside actors Arty Froushan, Emily Barber, and Tanisha Spring. The production opened in January 2026 to positive reviews including four stars in The Guardian, Financial Times, Evening Standard, The i,Time Out, The Independent, and WhatsOnStage. Sarah Hemming in the Financial Times writes that "Oli Higginson as Bateman's macho best friend Tim is particularly enjoyable", The Stage mentions that Higginson is "hilariously ghastly as his loathsome best pal", Broadway World commends Higginson as "wonderfully awful", and Theatre Weekly claims "Oli Higginson is a standout as Timothy Price, capturing the swaggering bravado of the Wall Street elite with sharply observed precision". Claire Allfree in The Telegraph writes: "Oli Higginson is properly ugly as Bateman’s best friend Tim Price, combining implacable narcissism with heartless, testosterone-fuelled misogyny. He is surely the production’s true psychopath". The production received two Olivier Award nominations, for Best Musical Revival and Lynne Page for Best Theatre Choreographer.

=== Writing ===
Higginson is an alumnus of the Orange Tree Theatre's prestigious Writers Collective 2023-2024. Higginson was selected from 800 applicants to develop a new play under the mentorship and guidance of the Orange Tree's literary department, in a cohort of six 'mid-career' writers including Ric Renton, Anne Odeke, and Kelly Jones. Previous alumni include Olivier Award-winner Chris Bush, two-time Olivier Award nominee Joe White, Sonali Bhattacharyya, Jade Anouka, Samuel Bailey, and Daniel York.

After drawing the attention of Soho Theatre during the Verity Bargate Award submission process, Oli was invited to be part of Soho Theatre's inaugural invite-only Writers' Group, developing new work under the mentorship of Max Elton and Pooja Sivaraman, from 2024-2026. Oli's debut play Highbridge, received a rehearsed reading at the Orange Tree Theatre in Autumn 2024, directed by Polina Kalinina, starring Kate Fleetwood, Bella Maclean, and Sam Troughton. In May 2025, Highbridge received a further workshop at the Orange Tree Theatre, funded by Arts Council England. This culminated in an invite-only staged reading, directed by Chelsea Walker at Jerwood Space, with a cast including Raffey Cassidy, Leo Bill, Sheyi Cole, Nancy Carroll, and Jack Myers.

=== Music ===
Higginson releases music under the moniker Modern Oli. When asked by Nyota Magazine about his music, he said: "I see myself as an artist. I act. I write. I sing. I’m interested in exploring art and humanity through a multitude of mediums, and I want to grow in all areas of my work. I love being challenged, and the best way to do that is to keep trying new things, exploring new things. For as long as I live, I plan to do this as an actor, and I plan to do this as a musician, too." Higginson told TMRW Magazine: “Give a man a mask and he’ll show you his true face ... That’s kind of the reason why I wanted to release music under Modern Oli and not under Oli Higginson. I think only through some form of character, some form of costume, some form of mask, can you be truly honest and reveal yourself ... Truth is truth, you can fuck around as much as you like, but if it is not coming from somewhere quite deep inside you then I think it’s very hard for people to connect to that.”

In October 2025, he headlined The Grace, previously known as Above The Garage, in North London. The debut show sold out in 4 hours. The venue is widely regarded as an intimate right-of-passage on the London music scene. In December 2025, Modern Oli opened for Skinny Living at their major London show at Dingwalls. In late 2025, Oli shared via his Modern Oli Instagram that his debut release is due in early 2026. On 12th January 2026 he announced that his debut single, One of Those Faces, would be released on January 23rd, distributed by AWAL, a subsidiary of Sony Music. A week before its release, the song had its debut radio play on the Gaby Roslin show on BBC Radio London for over half a million listeners. The song received 60,000 streams in its opening few weeks, leading to Mollie King featuring the track on her BBC Radio 1 Future Pop show on February 25th. Modern Oli's second single, Transatlantic was released on February 20th. On February 22nd, he announced an intimate stripped-back headline 'secret show' to take place the St Pancras Clocktower on March 1st. Ticket links were distributed exclusively to his closest fans via Instagram DMs. The show sold-out in two hours. In the same week that his debut single One of Those Faces reached 100,000 streams, Oli announced he would headline the 400-capacity venue OSLO in Hackney, East London on September 18. His third single, Don't Let Me Love You was released on March 20 as well as a music video starring Oli alongside fellow Bridgerton star Emma Naomi. The video premiered on Notion with the song being praised for “[flipping] the language of traditional love songs on its head, turning devotion into something conflicted, even self-destructive”.Notion lauded the “stark, liminal spaces — hotel rooms, empty streets” in Misha Citron’s video.

Between April and June 2026, Modern Oli played several sold out headline shows, debuting in multiple cities across the world, including New York City, Los Angeles, London, and Budapest.

In their review of his sold-out show at Permanent Records in LA, Mama's Geeky magazine called the performance "unforgettable", writing: "There is something truly special about seeing an artist in an intimate setting before they start selling out arenas, and Oli Higginson - performing under his musical moniker Modern Oli - is undeniably on that trajectory ... I have to admit, I walked out feeling like I'd just witnessed the 'I was there' moment of a future star".

Glamour Magazine commented on the level of intimacy at Modern Oli's sold-out show at COCO in Budapest, writing "I don't think I've ever seen an artist be so vulnerable ... looking into our eyes, throwing us a smile, singing a line into someone's camera. He enjoys being able to connect, having people he sings to within arm's reach ... these sparkling eyes all over the room as everyone eases into the unexpected intimacy that this British guy has effortlessly created."

His next major headline show will be in London at 400-capacity venue OSLO in Hackney on September 18, followed by Supersonic Records in Paris during Fashion Week on October 1. It was announced that Modern Oli will perform at Solid Ground festival on August 15, on a bill curated by indie-soul band Skinny Living.

== Personal life ==
He has been married to American actress and musician Meaghan Martin since 2016.

== Filmography ==
Year	Title	Role	Notes
2020	Cursed	Tobias	1 episode
2020	The Last Five Years	Jamie	Live Recording
2021	The Pursuit of Love	Colin	1 episode
2022	This England	Saul	
2022	Treadmill	Atlas	Short
2023	The Chelsea Detective	Jack Felton	Guest Star
2024	Julia	Jacques Brel	Guest Star
2024	Othello	Cassio	Live Recording
2025	Pipe Dream	Danny	Short
2020–present	Bridgerton	Footman John	Recurring Role
2026	Conversations With Friends	Richard	Short

== Selected stage credits ==
Year	Title	Role	Theater	Notes	Ref.
2020	The Haystack	Rob	Hampstead Theatre		
2020	The Last Five Years	Jamie	Southwark Playhouse	Offie Nomination	
2021	The Last Five Years	Jamie	Garrick Theatre, West End	Stage Debut Award Nomination	
2021	A Christmas Carol	Fred	The Old Vic		
2022	LAVA	Jamie	Soho Theatre		
2023	Smoke	John	Southwark Playhouse		
2024	After Sex	Him	Arcola Theatre		
2024	Othello	Cassio	Sam Wanamaker Playhouse Shakespeare's Globe	Ian Charleson Award Nomination	
2025	Measure for Measure	Claudio	Royal Shakespeare Company		
2026	American Psycho	Timothy Price	Almeida Theatre		

== Awards and nominations ==
Awards and nominations received by Oli Higginson
Year	Award	Category	Nominated work	Result	Ref.
2020	The Stage Debut Awards	Best Performer in a Musical	The Last Five Years	Nominated	
2021	Offie	Best Lead Performance (Musical)	The Last Five Years	Nominated	
2025	Ian Charleson Awards		Othello	Nominated	
