= Sleepover (film) =

2004 film by Joe Nussbaum

- Theatrical release poster
- Directed by: Joe Nussbaum
- Written by: Elisa Bell
- Produced by: Charles Weinstock; Bob Cooper
- Starring: Alexa Vega; Mika Boorem; Jane Lynch; Sara Paxton; Brie Larson; Steve Carell; Jeff Garlin
- Cinematography: James L. Carter
- Edited by: Craig P. Herring
- Music by: Deborah Lurie
- Production companies: Metro-Goldwyn-Mayer; Landscape Entertainment; Weinstock Productions
- Distributed by: Metro-Goldwyn-Mayer
- Release date: July 9, 2004
- Running time: 89 minutes
- Country: United States
- Language: English
- Budget: $10 million
- Box office: $10.1 million

Sleepover is a 2004 American teen comedy film directed by Joe Nussbaum in his feature film directorial debut, and starring Alexa Vega, Mika Boorem, Jane Lynch, Sara Paxton, Scout Taylor-Compton, Brie Larson, Kallie Flynn Childress, Steve Carell, and Jeff Garlin. The film follows a group of four female junior high school graduates who enter an all-night scavenger hunt against a popular rival clique at their school. Sean Faris, Sam Huntington, Evan Peters, and Hunter Parrish appear in supporting roles.

It was released theatrically in the United States on July 9, 2004, and was both a box office and critical failure upon its release, but has since developed a cult following among fans who viewed the film through the ancillary market in subsequent years.

== Plot ==
On the last day of eighth grade before their freshman year in high school, Julie Corky has a slumber party with three friends, Hannah Carlson, Farrah James, and Yancy Williams. A group of popular girls, led by a former friend of Julie's, Staci Blake, challenge the girls to a scavenger hunt after Staci's boyfriend dumps her. The prize is a coveted lunchtime seat near the fountain in high school, where the popular kids sit. The losers will sit at tables near the school's dumpsters.

The list includes things like a picture of the girls with a date inside a nightclub, the insignia from a local private security company, a pair of boxers from Steve Phillips (a boy that Julie has a crush on) and to dress an Old Navy mannequin with their own clothing. After paying her older brother Ren to keep her parents thinking that they are still home, the girls sneak out of Julie's house, using a Hypermini belonging to Yancy's father, to travel to different locations and get the required objects. Along the way they dodge a Patroltec security guard and try to keep Julie's parents Gabby and Jay from discovering their absence. At the club, the four sneak in and Julie discovers that her schoolteacher is her date. Understanding her situation, he buys her a drink. Julie drops her scarf, which Gabby who is having a girl's night out with a friend, finds at the same club and attempts to call Julie about. When Julie uses a skateboard to go home quickly after the Hypermini gets boxed in traffic, Steve Philips, in his car, sees Julie skateboarding by in a dress and is impressed. Julie arrives home and speaks with her father, proving to him that she is in fact, at home. Once she speaks with her father and Ren, who agrees to keep covering for her, she leaves and sneaks into Steve's house. Steve and his friend are talking about the girl they saw skateboarding and looking through an old yearbook realizes it was Julie. Julie, who is in his house narrowly escapes him in the bathroom, before grabbing his boxers and leaving. The other three girls meanwhile try to find a way to charge their car, and Staci and her team alert Patroltec about a suspicious person at Steve's house. Finally, before running away, they grab the Patroltec insignia on the security guard's car. Later the girls meet up at the school dance, but both groups have obtained all listed items.

Staci suggests a tiebreaker, where the group which is able to get the crown from the king or queen of the dance will win. Staci catches her boyfriend, Todd, dancing with and kissing another girl who claims that she has been Todd's girlfriend for six months. After the two break up, Staci shares a dance with a scruffy skater friend of Julie's, Russell. Russell drops his copy of the scavenger hunt list, which Steve finds. Russell and Staci end up winning the dance contest causing a fight between Todd and his girlfriend. Steve ends up named homecoming king and picks Julie as his partner for a victory dance, giving her the crown and ensuring victory for her friends.

After the dance, Julie and Steve are about to kiss when Ren calls and informs her that Gabby is on her way home. The girls drive home where Julie drops the crown. They make it home at the same time as Gabby and narrowly miss being caught sneaking in. They pretend to be sleeping just as Julie's parents check on them. The next morning at breakfast, Gabby confronts her asking "exactly" what they did last night, showing Julie the scarf she had dropped in the Cosmo club. Surprisingly, she is not mad but confesses her amazement at how fast Julie is maturing. After she says goodbye to her friends, Julie finds Steve waiting inside her tree fort with her lost crown, where the two finally share a kiss. Finally, Staci and her friends are in high school, and are eating their lunch by the school dumpsters among the trash and the social rejects.

== Cast ==
- Alexa Vega as Julie Corky, a 14-year-old girl who has a sleepover with her best friends to celebrate the summer.
- Mika Boorem as Hannah Carlson, a teenager who is the best friend of Julie, and ends up moving to Vancouver. She is somewhat the leader of the group because of her leadership and determination.
- Jane Lynch as Gabby Corky, the mother of Julie and Ren Corky, who has a "girls night" to have fun.
- Sara Paxton as Staci Blake, one of the queen bees of the school and a typical middle school mean girl. She and her best friend Liz plan a scavenger hunt for her, Julie and her friends, which Hannah ends up changing the rules so Julie, Farrah, and Yancy can sit at "The Fountain" freshman year of high school.
- Brie Larson as Liz Daniels, one of Staci's friends.
- Steve Carell as Officer Sherman Shiner, a security officer in Julie's neighborhood, whom the girls encounter multiple times.
- Jeff Garlin as Jay Corky, the father of Julie and Ren Corky, who is a plumber. He has his heart obsessively determined on fixing the water in their house during the sleepover.
- Scout Taylor-Compton as Farrah James, Hannah and Julie's best friend and is known for being the fashionista of the group.
- Kallie Flynn Childress as Yancy Williams, a slightly overweight teenage girl, who is very self-conscious and worries about what people think about her.
- Sam Huntington as Ren Corky, Julie's older brother.
- Sean Faris as Steve Phillips, the local hottie of high school.
- Evan Peters as Russell "Spongebob" Hayes, a very clumsy skateboarder who has his heart set on making Staci fall in love with him.
- Ryan Slattery as Peter, Yancy's love interest.
- Johnny Sneed as Mr. Corrado, the girls' teacher.
- Douglas Smith as Gregg, one of Steve's friend.
- Katija Pevec as Molly, one of Staci's friends.
- Eileen April Boylan as Jenna, one of Staci's friends.
- Thad Luckinbill as Todd, Staci's ex-boyfriend.
- Alice Greczyn as Linda, Todd's new girlfriend.
- Shane Hunter as Miles, one of Russell's friends.
- Hunter Parrish as Lance, one of Russell's friends.
- Max Van Ville as Skater Dude, one of Steve's friends.
- Summer Glau as a lonely ticket girl.

== Reception ==
=== Box office ===
The film underperformed, opening at #10 in the box office with $4.2 million. The film would later make $9.4 million in the United States and $712,563 internationally, resulting in a $10,148,953 gross worldwide, on a $10 million budget.

=== Critical response ===
On Rotten Tomatoes, the film has an approval rating of 15% based on 99 reviews, with an average rating of 3.7/10. The site's critics' consensus reads, "Tween girls will enjoy this sugar coated fluff, but others will find Sleepover a snooze." On Metacritic, the film has a score of 33% based on reviews from 29 critics, indicating "generally unfavorable reviews".

Kevin Thomas of the Los Angeles Times called it "a skillfully made teen comedy with [such] an endearing sensibility", praising Elisa Bell's screenplay for having "a sturdy, dynamically structured context" for the hijinks, and Joe Nussbaum's direction for maintaining "a high-spirited, exhilarating pace" while giving his main cast more dimension. Sean Axmaker of the Seattle Post-Intelligencer wrote: "For all of the fantasy elements that might make an adult uneasy, "Sleepover" empowers its 14-year-olds and comes through with a Cinderella story sure to charm every girl who isn't part of the cool clique." Bill Beyrer of CinemaBlend called it "a nice lighthearted piece of entertainment" that mothers with young daughters should see together. Sid Smith of the Chicago Tribune critiqued that the film is "a sweet, effective installment, an often bright and efficient repository for the slapstick laughs and cutesy sentiments so beloved by this age group", commending the filmmakers for creating "amusing original touches" to the girls' scavenger hunt hijinks and adding a "perfect dosage of adolescent moralisms" for the audience.

Claudia Puig of USA Today commended Vega for showcasing her "romantic comedy chops" in a "banal, relatively innocent comedy" that feels "derivative and pale" compared to Freaky Friday and Mean Girls and wastes the comedic talents of Lynch and Garlin as Vega's parents. Carla Meyer of the San Francisco Chronicle praised Vega for delivering "a solid, winning performance" and Childress for being "lovely and charismatic" in her role, but critiqued that the movie was "a good-hearted 'tween comedy hampered by uneven direction and a misguided plot twist." Sara Gebhardt of The Washington Post felt the film was not "overwhelmingly original or funny" and teaches lessons that are not always the "best ideals", but concluded that "since it was not intended as a witty take on teenage culture, it's better just to accept the film at face value." Stephen Holden of The New York Times called it "a wispy pubescent comedy" that follows the "John Hughes teenage comedy" formula, but for a pre-teen audience with "a thick gloss of farce", saying: "On its own terms, I suppose, it is cheery enough as it searches for a wobbly balance between Mean Girls edge and princessy ick."

David Germain of the Associated Press panned the film and found it tasteless, writing that it "objectifies early teenage girls in a manner that’s disagreeable and indelicate at best, cheap and vulgar at worst. It’s one thing for pre-high schoolers to "borrow" Mom’s car and embark on an all-night scavenger hunt. It’s another when that scavenger hunt requires a 14-year-old girl to rendezvous at a bar with a grown man, dug up on an online dating service, so she can get him to buy her a drink. Considering that her "date" turns out to be one of her junior high teachers, Sleepover steers disturbingly from wholesome fun into Lolita territory."

Variety's Joe Leydon commended the cast for delivering tolerable performances, but was critical of Bell's "derivative script" and Nussbaum's direction struggling to maintain "a bright and cheery tone and a fast and furious pace", and observed the "naughty behavior" the teen girls get involved as "unsettling" and "queasiness-enducing", saying: "Even by the notoriously flexible standards of bubblegum teen pics, "Sleepover" comes off as wildly unbelievable and often astonishingly silly." Keith Phipps of The A.V. Club criticized the film for buying into its own social hiearchy message while offering "After Hours-for-kids' attempts at manic energy," suggesting that audiences should watch a film similar to Mean Girls instead. Roger Ebert criticized the film for being "a lame and labored comedy," highlighting its young adult cast as being "shadows of shadows, diluted from countless better, even marginally better, movies." Entertainment Weekly's Scott Brown gave the movie an overall 'F' grade, calling it "Hollywood's latest slimy incursion into very early adolescence".

=== Accolades ===
Award/association	Year	Category	Recipients/nominees	Result	Ref.
Young Artist Awards	2005	Best Performance in a Feature Film - Young Ensemble Cast	Mika Boorem; Eileen Boylan; Kallie Flynn Childress; Scout Taylor-Compton; Sean Faris; Brie Larson; Hunter Parrish; Sara Paxton; Evan Peters; Katija Pevec; Ryan Martinez-Slattery; Douglas Smith; Alexa Vega	Nominated	
Young Artist Awards	2005	Best Performance in a Feature Film - Leading Young Actress	Alexa Vega	Nominated	
Young Artist Awards	2005	Best Performance in a Feature Film - Supporting Young Actress	Kallie Flynn Childress	Won	
Young Artist Awards	2005	Best Family Feature Film - Comedy or Musical		Nominated	

== Soundtrack ==
1. "Imaginary Superstar" – Skye Sweetnam
2. "Freeze Frame" – Jump5
3. "I Want Everything" – Hope 7
4. "That's What Girls Do" – No Secrets
5. "Stuck" – Allister
6. "Havin' Fun" – Planet Melvin
7. "Remember" – Gabriel Mann
8. "We Close Our Eyes" – Allister
9. "Hole in the Head" – Sugababes
10. "Next Big Me" – Verbalicious
11. "Heaven Is a Place on Earth" – Becky Baeling
12. "Wannabe" – Spice Girls
