= Ryan Slattery =

American actor

- Born: Ryan Paul Slattery; Ventura, California, U.S.
- Education: Harvard University (ALB); University of California, Los Angeles (MFA)
- Years active: 1993–2012

Ryan Paul Slattery is an American film and television actor, writer, producer, and director. Slattery is most notable for his work in the MGM film Sleepover as Peter, the kind-hearted boy who befriends Yancy, played by Kallie Flynn Childress.

== Early life and education ==
Slattery was born in Ventura, California, and attended Shadow Mountain High School in Phoenix, Arizona, where he played baseball.

He went on to attend Harvard University, where he received his bachelor's degree in Dramatic Arts and Film Studies, and the renowned UCLA Film School, earning a Master of Fine Arts degree in the UCLA Producers Program.

== Film and television career ==
Slattery is best known as an actor, with credits in film and television including the MGM film Sleepover, and television series including The Jersey on the Disney Channel, The District on CBS, American Dreams on NBC, JAG on CBS, and MTV's Undressed on MTV.

He was nominated for a Young Artist Award (Best Performance in a Feature Film, Young Ensemble Cast) for his role as Peter in the film Sleepover.

Slattery is also a film and television writer, producer, and director. His film Playtime (Spielzeit) premiered at the 2012 Sundance Film Festival.

His directorial debut, At Ease, about the US Military's controversial Don't Ask, Don't Tell policy, was released on October 21, 2010, and has received positive reviews.

== Personal life ==
After the events of September 11th, 2001, Slattery donated his salary from the television show JAG to victims.

Slattery was a contestant on the April 24, 2007 episode on Wheel of Fortune, in which he was the big winner winning $41,850, including the bonus round.

Slattery was an intern on Capitol Hill for a United States Congressman.

He is also a Private Pilot, licensed for fixed wing aircraft.

== Filmography ==
Producer, Writer, Director
Year	Title	Role	Notes
2010	At Ease (film)	Director, writer, producer	
2012	L&M (film)	Producer	
2012	Playtime (Spielzeit)	Producer	2012 Sundance Film Festival

Actor - Film
Year	Title	Role	Notes
1993	Showdown	Student	
1999	Runaway Bride	Wedding Guest	
2000	Cecil B. Demented	Jock	
2000	The Replacements	Ticket Taker	
2000	Book of Shadows: Blair Witch 2		
2003	Salt	Luke	
2004	Sleepover	Peter	
2007	Superpower	Ryan	

Actor - Television
Year	Title	Role	Notes
1993	NickAmerica	Ryan	Nickelodeon
2000	The Corner		TV miniseries
2001	Undressed	Dan	MTV/Season 5
2002	JAG	Technician	CBS
2002	American Dreams	Chris	NBC
2002	The Jersey	Turner	Disney Channel
2004	The District	Bob	CBS
