= Clipping Adam =

- Directed by: Michael Picchiottino
- Screenplay by: Michael Picchiottino
- Produced by: Mike Gabrawy; Michael Picchiottino
- Starring: Chris Eigeman; Louise Fletcher; Robert Pine; Bryan Burke; Kevin Sorbo; Evan Peters; Ryan Willis
- Cinematography: Jim Orr
- Edited by: Patrick Gallagher; Basem Wasef
- Music by: Dean Harada
- Release date: April 22, 2004 (RiverRun International Film Festival)
- Running time: 90 minutes
- Country: United States
- Language: English

Clipping Adam is a 2004 American drama film written and directed by Michael Picchiottino and starring Chris Eigeman, Louise Fletcher, Robert Pine, Bryan Burke, Ryan Willis, Kevin Sorbo and Evan Peters.

== Plot ==
A coming of age drama about Adam Sheppard, a 15-year-old teenager in Southern California dealing with the grief of a car crash that killed his sister and mother.

== Cast ==
- Evan Peters as Adam Sheppard
- Chris Eigeman as Tom Sheppard
- Louise Fletcher as Grammy
- Robert Pine as Principal Biggs
- Bryan Burke as Johnny Dominguez
- Kevin Sorbo as Father Dan
- Megan Strahm
- Cassidy Burwell as Sara Shepard
- Donato Mario Alleva
- Ryan Willis
