= Eileen April Boylan =

American film and television actress (born 1987)

Eileen April Boylan (born May 10, 1987) is an American film and television actress. She stands 5 ft 1 in (1.55 m) and is of Filipino and Irish descent.

== Biography ==
Boylan was born in Acton, California.

== Film ==
Boylan made her film debut playing a younger version of the title character in the 2001 film Alex in Wonder (a.k.a. Sex and a Girl). In 2004, she starred opposite Alexa Vega and Sara Paxton in the film Sleepover. She starred in her first leading role playing the title character in the 2008 independent film Dakota Skye. In 2011, Boylan starred opposite Tom Selleck as a central character in the television movie Jesse Stone: Innocents Lost.

== Television ==
Boylan's television credits include roles on Baywatch, General Hospital, Judging Amy and a recurring role on the Lifetime original series Strong Medicine. In 2006, she joined the ensemble cast of The N original series South of Nowhere, portraying Kyla Woods throughout the second and third seasons. Boylan made appearances in various TV serials from 2008 through 2009, including a role in the Life episode "Everything...All The Time", and as a college girl named Melissa in the How I Met Your Mother episode "Three Days of Snow". She had a recurring role on the ABC Family TV series Greek as the ditsy and often drunk sorority girl Betsy, from 2008 until the series’ cancellation in 2011.

== Filmography ==
Year	Title	Role	Notes
2001	Alex in Wonder	Young Alex	
2004	Sleepover	Jenna	
2006	Sideliners	Barbie Green	TV movie
2008	Dakota Skye	Dakota Skye	
2009	Making Change	C Girl	
2011	Jesse Stone: Innocents Lost	Cindy Van Alden	TV movie

=== Television ===
Year	Title	Role	Notes
1998	Four Corners		1 episode
1998	Baywatch	Little Girl	1 episode
2000–2001	The Amanda Show		2 episodes
2001	Special Unit 2	Girl	1 episode
2002	The Bernie Mac Show	Shannon	1 episode
2003	General Hospital	Sage Alcazar	11 episodes
2003	Judging Amy	Lydia Chavez	1 episode
2005–2006	Strong Medicine	Araya	7 episodes
2006–2008	South of Nowhere	Kyla Woods	26 episodes
2008	Days of Our Lives	Tiffany	2 episodes
2008	Life	Carla Horta	1 episode
2009	How I Met Your Mother	Melissa	1 episode
2009	Valley Peaks	Monique	1 episode
2008–2011	Greek	Betsy	26 episodes
