= Katija Pevec =

American actress

- Born: Honolulu, Hawaii, U.S.
- Occupation: Actress
- Years active: 2003–2013

Katija Pevec is an American actress. She is best known for her roles as Christina Beardsley in the 2005 film Yours, Mine and Ours, and Lauren Zelmer on the short-lived Nickelodeon television series, Just for Kicks.

== Career ==
Pevec was born in Honolulu, Hawaii. As a child, she took singing, dancing and acting lessons. She made her major acting debut in the lead role of the 2003 Air Bud sequel Air Bud: Spikes Back. In the next year she had a supporting role in the film Sleepover opposite Alexa Vega and Sara Paxton. Pevec's most notable role to date was in the 2005 Nickelodeon theatrical film Yours, Mine and Ours. As well as appearing in the films Art School Confidential (2006), Eagle Eye (2008), and Life Is Hot in Cracktown (2009).

In 2006, she co-starred in the Nickelodeon comedy-drama series, Just for Kicks. The series was executive produced by Whoopi Goldberg and only lasted one season. Pevec's other television credits include Cracking Up, Medical Investigation, Without a Trace, and Three Rivers.

== Filmography ==
Year	Title	Role	Notes
2003	Air Bud Spikes Back	Andrea Framm	Main role, direct to-video film
2004	Cracking Up	Hannah	Episodes: "Grudge Match" & "Learning Disability"
2004	Sleepover	Molly	Theatrical film
2004	Medical Investigation	Ruby	Episode: "In Bloom"
2005	Listen Up	Jillian	Episode: "Waiting for Kleinman"
2005	Yours, Mine & Ours	Christina Beardsley	Main role, theatrical film
2006	Without a Trace	Kelly McMurphy	Episode: "Shattered"
2006	Just for Kicks	Lauren Zelmer	Series regular
2006	Art School Confidential	Cynthia Platz	Independent film
2008	Eagle Eye	Teenage Page	Theatrical film
2009	Life Is Hot in Cracktown	Becky	Theatrical film
2009	Three Rivers	Jenny	Episode: "Ryan's First Day"
2013	The Den	Jenni	Theatrical film
2013	Pop Up	Katija	
