= Kallie Flynn Childress =

American actress

- Other names: Kallie Childress; Kallie Flynn
- Occupation: Actress
- Years active: 2003–2011

Kallie Flynn Childress is an American actress. She is best known for her role as Yancy in the 2004 film Sleepover, for which she won a Young Artist Award for Best Performance in a Feature Film - Supporting Young Actress at the 2005 ceremony.

== Career ==
Childress began acting at the age of five. She attended and graduated from Barbizon Modeling and Acting School in Chicago. Besides Sleepover, she appeared in television series Judging Amy, CSI: Miami, Days of Our Lives, Cougar Town and Good Luck Charlie. In 2011, she appeared in the short film Dark All Around.

Childress is also a singer-songwriter, she has released music via the iTunes Store.

== Filmography ==
Year	Title	Role	Notes
2003	Vegas Dick	(unknown)	Unsold TV pilot
2003	Judging Amy	Megan Moran	Episode: "Picture of Perfect"
2004	Target	Girl in Park	Direct-to-video film
2004	Sleepover	Yancy Williams	
2007	Days of Our Lives	Teen Ali Horton	Episode #1.10684
2009	Wild Cherry	Interview	
2010	CSI: Miami	Jill Quinn	Episode: "Spring Breakdown"
2010	Cougar Town	Glee Club Member #5	Episode: "Breakdown"
2010	Good Luck Charlie	Crystal	Episode: "Kwikki Chick"
2011	Dark All Around	Autumn	Short film
