= Bill and Cheri Steinkellner =

American screenwriters

Bill Steinkellner
- Born: William Edward Steinkellner; February 5, 1949 (age 76)
- Occupation(s): Screenwriter, producer
- Years active: 1981–present
- Spouse: Cheri Steinkellner

Cheri Steinkellner
- Born: Cheryl Lynn Eichen; November 25, 1955 (age 69); Los Angeles, California
- Occupation(s): Screenwriter, television producer, songwriter
- Years active: 1975–present
- Spouse: Bill Steinkellner

Bill Steinkellner and Cheri Steinkellner are an American husband and wife screenwriting duo, known for their work on Cheers, Teacher's Pet, its film adaptation of the same name, and Bob. They wrote the book of the musical Sister Act, for which they received a Tony Award nomination.

== Personal lives ==
Bill and Cheri have been married since 1982 and together, they have three children: Emma (author/illustrator of the graphic novel The Okay Witch, and illustrator of the graphic novel Quince), Kit (writer of Quince), and Teddy.

== Filmography ==
Year	Title	Writer	Producer	Other	Note
1975	Bing Crosby and Fred Astaire: A Couple of Song and Dance Men			check	Herself (Cheri only)
1978	America 2 Night			check	'Taters' The Clown (Bill)
1980	Pink Lady			check	Herself (Cheri Only)
1980	Bosom Buddies			check	Actress (Cheri only)
1981	The Pee Wee Herman Show	check			TV movie
1983	The Creature Wasn't Nice			check	Actress (Cheri only)
1983	The New Scooby and Scrappy-Doo Show			check	Actress (Cheri only)
1983	Deck the Halls with Wacky Walls			check	Actress (Cheri only)
1984–1985	The Jeffersons	check			Writer, story editor (29 episodes total)
1984–1985	The Facts of Life	check			Story (2 episode)
1985	Benson	check			1 episode
1985	CBS Storybreak			check	Actress (Cheri only)
1985–1992	Cheers	check	check	check	Writer, executive producer, co-executive producers, producer, executive script consultant, executive story consultant, actors (themselves)
1985–1986	Who's the Boss	check			Story editor, writer
1987	The Tortellis	check			1 episode
1989	41st Primetime Emmy Awards			check	Themselves
1990	The Earth Day Special	check			Cheers segment
1992	The Upper Hand	check			2 episodes
1992–1993	Bob	check	check		Creators, writers, executive producers
1995	Hope and Gloria	check	check		Creators, writers, executive producers
1999–2000	Just Shoot Me!		check		Consulting producer (Bill only)
2000	Emeril		check		Co-executive producer (Bill only)
2000–2002	Teacher's Pet	check	check	check	Co-creators with Gary Baseman, writers, executive producers, story editor, music and lyrics (Cheri only)
2004	Teacher's Pet	check	check	check	Screenwriters, executive producers, music and lyrics (Cheri only)
2004	The Lion King 1½	check			Additional screenplay material (Bill only)
2009	Dorm Life			check	Actress (Cheri only)
2009	The Lone Star Cowboy			check	Actor (Bill only; short)
2011	Cheers			check	Based on original episodes (3 episodes)
2011	The Pee Wee Herman Show on Broadway	check			TV movie; Bill only
2012	The Soul Man		check		Consulting producer (4 episodes; Bill only)

=== Unrealized projects ===
- Toy Story 3

== Theater ==
Year	Title	Credit	Ref.
2005	Princesses	Playwrights	
2006	Sister Act	Book writer	
2023	Summer Stock	Book Writer (Cheri)	

== Awards and nominations ==
Year	Award	Category	Project	Nominee (shared with)	Result
1989	Primetime Emmy Award	Outstanding Comedy Series	Cheers	James Burrows, Glen Charles, Les Charles, Peter Casey, David Lee, David Angell, Phoef Sutton, Tim Berry	Won
1990	Primetime Emmy Award	Outstanding Comedy Series	Cheers	James Burrows, Glen Charles, Les Charles, Peter Casey, David Lee, David Angell, Phoef Sutton, Tim Berry, Andy Ackerman	Nominated
1991	Primetime Emmy Award	Outstanding Informational Special	Cheers - 200th Anniversary Special	James Burrows, Glen Charles, Les Charles, Phoef Sutton, Tim Berry, Andy Ackerman, Brian Pollack, Mert Rich, Dan O'Shannon, Tom Anderson, Larry Balmagia	Nominated
1991	Primetime Emmy Award	Outstanding Comedy Series	Cheers	James Burrows, Glen Charles, Les Charles, Phoef Sutton, Tim Berry, Andy Ackerman, Brian Pollack, Mert Rich, Dan O'Shannon, Tom Anderson, Larry Balmagia	Won
1992	Primetime Emmy Award	Outstanding Comedy Series	Cheers	James Burrows, Glen Charles, Les Charles, Phoef Sutton, Dan O'Shannon, Tom Anderson, Tim Berry, Dan Staley, Rob Lon	Nominated
2001	BAFTA Award	British Academy Children's Awards - Best International	Teacher's Pet	Gary Baseman	Won
2001	World Animation Celebration	Best Daytime Television Series	Teacher's Pet	Gary Baseman	Won
2002	Daytime Emmy	Outstanding Special Class Animated Program	Teacher's Pet	Gary Baseman, Jess Winfield, Nancylee Myatt, Timothy Björklund, Don MacKinnon, Alfred Gimeno, Jamie Thomason, Julie Morgavi, David Maples, Billiam Coronel	Won
2003	Daytime Emmy	Outstanding Special Class Animated Program	Teacher's Pet	Gary Baseman, Jess Winfield, Don MacKinnon, Ennio Torresan, Alfred Gimeno, Julie Morgavi, David Maples, Billiam Coronel	Won
2011	Tony Awards	Best Book of a Musical	Sister Act		Nominated
