= Cranium, Inc. =

Board game publisher

Coordinates: 47.611492°N 122.343788°W

- Type: Subsidiary of Hasbro
- Industry: Games
- Founded: 1998; 28 years ago
- Founders: Richard Tait, Whit Alexander
- Defunct: 2008; 18 years ago
- Fate: Merged into Hasbro
- Headquarters: Seattle, Washington, U.S.
- Products: Cranium
- Parent: Hasbro, Inc.

Cranium, Inc. was an American board game company in Seattle that sold various games and toys including Cranium and Whoonu. Cranium was co-founded in 1998 by the former Microsoft executives Richard Tait and Whit Alexander, who oversaw growth and operations until 2008, when it was acquired by Hasbro for $77.5 million.

== Origin ==
Richard Tait was inspired to develop a board game that everyone could win while on vacation in The Hamptons, where he easily won Pictionary and his friends easily won Scrabble. He partnered with Whit Alexander, who he worked with at Microsoft before they both left in 1997 to pursue their own projects. They invested $100,000 of savings into developing the game. Giorgio Davanzo created the packaging and brand identity for the game, and Gary Baseman, co-creator of the animated series Teacher's Pet, did the art.

During development, Tait and Alexander studied Herrmann brain dominance instrument thinking styles assessment and the theory of multiple intelligences by psychologist Howard Gardner. They incorporated aspects of other games, requiring players to spell, draw, mold clay, and answer trivia questions. More than 20 focus groups were used, and some testers reportedly tried to take it home. The name was supposedly inspired by a scene from the 1993 comedy So I Married an Ax Murderer in which Mike Myers says, "Look at the cranium on that boy!"

After ordering thousands of copies of Cranium in 1998, the co-founders realized they had missed North American International Toy Fair where all major retailers buy board games for the Christmas season, and pursued an alternative distribution strategy.

== Marketing and popularity ==
Cranium, Inc. was known for its unorthodox marketing and distribution strategies, which initially bypassed toy stores to reach its target demographic of "25-35 year old, dating yuppies who wanted to connect to each other" (or members of Gen X experiencing "Internet alienation"). Upon its debut in November 1998, the initial Cranium board game was initially sold at 1500 Starbucks stores, soon followed by Barnes & Noble and Amazon.com—the first board game ever sold by both Starbucks and Amazon, and the first sold nationwide by Barnes & Noble. Cranium, Inc. turned a profit after four months and sold 100,000 copies of Cranium in its first year.

Instead of TV commercials, Cranium recruited radio jocks promotions costing just $15,000. Later as part of corporate partnerships, trivia questions from Cranium game were featured on napkins in Delta Song Airlines, on Dr. Pepper bottles at KFC, and on packages of Land O' Lakes butter. A "Club Cranium" membership program could be joined using codes included in game materials. As of 2006, the company had a database of 400,000 players, called "Craniacs".

On The Oprah Winfrey Show, Julia Roberts said that Cranium "was the most fun game ever" and that she and boyfriend Benjamin Bratt "could not stop playing it." In 2000, Al Gore told Vogue that he spent much of his birthday playing Cranium with his family.

== Expansion and acquisition ==
Cranium expanded into traditional retail in 2002, beginning with Target and Toys "R" Us. By late 2002, the Chicago Tribune reported 2 million copies of Cranium had been sold; across all international versions and spinoffs, the number was 4 million. Those spinoffs included Hoopla for fewer players, Cadoo for ages 7 and up, and Hullabaloo for ages 4 and up.

By 2006, Cranium had introduced 14 games, and was selling its products in 30 countries and 10 languages. The company published The Cranium Big Book of Outrageous Fun, which became the top-selling activity book of 2005.

The Toy Industry Association awarded the "Game of the Year" award to Cranium in 2001, Cadoo in 2002, and Hullabaloo in 2003. By 2005, Cranium, Inc. had won more than 130 awards and sold more than 22 million games and toys.

Cranium's office in Seattle was designed in the shape and colors of the original Cranium board, with bright red, blue and green paint. There was no carpeting so that staff could ride skateboards. In 2006, Cranium, Inc. had about 100 employees.

On January 4, 2008, Hasbro bought Cranium, Inc. for $77.5 million.

== Toys and games ==
- Balloon Lagoon
- Ballpark Blast
- Bumparena
- Cadoo
- Cariboo
- Conga
- Connect-O-Round
- Cranium
- Cranium Wonder Works Talking Picture Book
- Doodle Tales
- Family Fun
- Giggle Gear Mega Mask
- Hoopla
- Hullabaloo DVD Game
- Let's Play Neighborhood Family Fun Game
- Megafort
- Pop 5
- Super Fort Carnival Clubhouse
- Whoonu
- Zigity
- Zooreka
