= Gary Baseman =

American contemporary artist (born 1960)

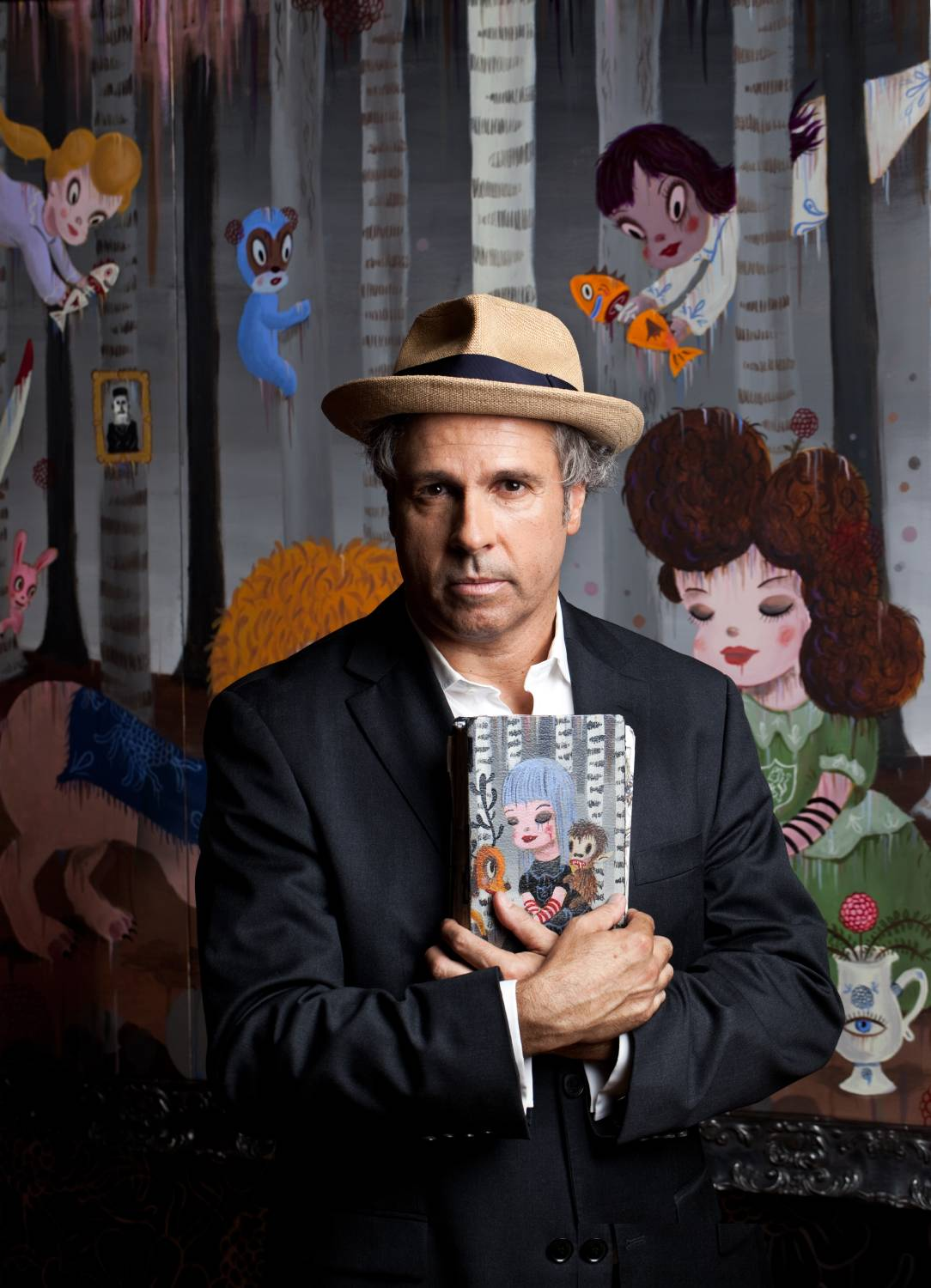
- Gary Baseman by Mark Hanauer, 2013
- Born: September 27, 1960 (age 66) Los Angeles, California
- Notable works: Teacher's Pet, Cranium
- Awards: Emmy Award, BAFTA award

Gary Baseman (born September 27, 1960) is an American artist, cartoonist, and animator who investigates history, heritage, and the human condition (especially love, longing, and loss). Through iconography and visual narratives that celebrate “the beauty of the bittersweetness of life,” his work brings together the worlds of popular culture and fine art.

Baseman’s career includes illustration for clients including The New York Times, Rolling Stone, and The Wall Street Journal and the bestselling board game Cranium; as well as animation for the Emmy and BAFTA award-winning series Teacher’s Pet and its subsequent feature-length film of the same name for ABC/Disney. He is a frequent speaker at international conferences on graphic and multidisciplinary arts and visual communications. Recent projects include a collaboration with COACH; a documentary Mythical Creatures about his family heritage; a traveling retrospective that featured hundreds of his paintings, photographs, videos, and toy and costume designs.

== Early life and education ==
Gary Baseman was born and raised in Los Angeles, California. The influence of media and Hollywood, blended with LA's influential art scene, led to how Baseman would perceive and produce art.

I grew up in the center of the city, the son of immigrants, attending public school with kids with different backgrounds. Our house was blocks away from CBS Television City. My mom worked at Canter’s in the Fairfax District, where people from the industry and rock-n-rollers would often land. I was a latchkey kid whose parents were often working, and whose older siblings were out on their own. Television was like my babysitter. Early on, my brother brought animation cels from Hanna-Barbera Studios home for me to play with. While sitting and drawing at the coffee table in the living room, I'd watch hours of cartoons and comedies and dramas.

Baseman graduated magna cum laude from UCLA with a degree in communications.

== Pervasive art ==
While Baseman is a figure in the Los Angeles art world, he is also situated within an international cultural movement that includes both mainstream and underground artists. Baseman cites Yoshitomo Nara, Takashi Murakami, and the illustrator William Joyce as contemporaries.

Baseman coined the term pervasive art as an alternative to the lowbrow art label. Baseman uses the term didactically to describe a broad shift in his and others' work to more visible avenues of art-making. He has stated that his goal is to "blur the lines between fine art and commercial art." According to Baseman, pervasive art can take any medium, and need not be "limited to one world, whether that is the gallery world, editorial world, or art toy world."

Today, artists whom Baseman might refer to as pervasive are part of a larger movement with a recognizable "pop" sense, but not necessarily a shared artistic mission. However, by virtue of where these artists are shown and in what ways they garner public attention, it can be said that all pervasive artists in some way play with the boundaries between high and low art.

Among artistic peers, critics, and Baseman followers, pervasive art referred to an aesthetic that was until recently, limited to the mediums of album art, comic books, cartoons, graffiti, and speciality galleries. Now, pervasive art is largely realized in multiple mediums and across a range of industries, from fashion design, advertising and graphic design, to toy design, film, music collaboratives, and music videos. Cult-status street artists like Banksy, new wave comics illustrators like Gary Panter, Japanese pop artists, post-punk and hip hop artists, and graphic artists like Shepard Fairey all contribute to a highly visible aesthetic that is virtually ubiquitous in contemporary culture.

Baseman himself exemplifies pervasive art in that he works commercially and also remains an independent fine artist. While he creates products that are sold to a mass market, he also shows in museums and galleries, selling original artworks to collectors. Baseman employs traditional art practices such as painting, printmaking, sculpture, drawing, and collage. For Baseman, being a pervasive artist means staying true to a particular message and aesthetic no matter the medium employed.

== Career ==
=== Illustration ===
As Tom Teicholz pointed out in his 2013 interview "Going Home with Gary Baseman",

"After graduating from UCLA, Baseman pursued a commercial art career while continuing to make art, “on the side.” He did a short stint at an ad agency, but that did not really agree with him, so he began to pursue work as a commercial illustrator. To make his American Dream come true and despite his parents’ initial objections, Baseman moved to New York in 1986.”

“The advertising and publishing and art world were all in New York. Every major artist was in New York, and at the time if you lived in L.A. you were a substandard regional artist. You had to go there”, Baseman has said.

From 1986-1996, Baseman worked as an illustrator in New York. He established himself during this period as an in-demand artist with a unique visual sense and the ability to generate sharp, witty messages. He earned several awards from American Illustration, Art Directors Club and Communication Arts. Baseman refers to his illustration work, and to his general process, as message-making. Baseman's drawings have been published in The New Yorker, The Atlantic Monthly, Time, Rolling Stone, The New York Times and The Los Angeles Times. He has had major independent and corporate clients such as AT&T Corporation, Gatorade, Nike, Inc. and Mercedes-Benz. Baseman created the visual identity for the best-selling board game Cranium. After ten years in New York, Baseman returned to Los Angeles to explore opportunities in art and entertainment.

=== Fine art ===
By the end of the 1990s, Baseman realized his creativity could extend beyond the world of illustration. His desire to learn and explore other areas of art would result in an explosive creative period for him that blurred lines and expanded audiences as he explained:

“I had a hunger for many things. I started looking at my legacy and thinking ‘what am I leaving behind me’? I loved the editorial work, but it didn’t seem rich enough. I had a fear of creating my own body of work and bringing it out into the world. It always stems from a fear of failure or that people won’t be interested. But I didn’t let that stop me. While doing my editorial work, even if I had an assignment, I couldn’t stop experimenting with my own things and painting like crazy, but still always made sure to hit my professional deadlines. At the same time, I also wanted to do TV; I created two pilots for Nickelodeon that never got created in the end. I was expanding in different ways, getting bigger within the toy world and participating in exhibitions. At the time, I was gradually giving up the editorial work, so it was an easier transition.”

In 1999, Baseman exhibited "Dumb Luck and Other Paintings About Lack of Control" at the Mendenhall Gallery in Los Angeles. The exhibition established Baseman's transition from illustration to fine art, during a time when many of his artist-friends, like Mark Ryden, the Clayton Brothers, and Eric White made similar moves.

Since then, Baseman has exhibited in museums and galleries throughout the United States, Brazil, Canada, China, France, Germany, Hong Kong, Israel, Italy, Mexico, New Zealand, the Philippines, Russia, Spain, Taiwan, Thailand, and the United Kingdom. Baseman's work is featured in the permanent collections of the Laguna Art Museum, Los Angeles County Museum of Art, National Portrait Gallery in Washington, D.C. and the Museum of Modern Art in Rome. Baseman had his first major art museum retrospective, "Gary Baseman: The Door is Always Open", in 2013 at the Skirball Cultural Center in Los Angeles, California. The exhibition presented more than 300 artworks (including paintings, photographs, toys, sketchbooks, and videos) in an experiential home environment in which guests were invited to sit on a sofa or at the dining room table and explore, participate and visit. The Door is Always Open has since traveled to MOCA Taipei, Taiwan (Summer 2014) and to Shanghai chi K11 Art Museum (Winter 2015).

=== Toby ===
Toby is one of Baseman's most recognizable characters, an adventurous cat that loves unconditionally. Toby is named after one of Baseman's childhood friends.

In 2005, Toby first appeared in drawings, paintings, and plush toys in the exhibition For the Love of Toby at Billy Shire Fine Arts in Culver City, California, marking the official beginning of Toby as a bridge between character development, toy culture, and fine art. Debuted at a crucial moment when popular culture and lifestyle strongly influenced art, Toby represents an important aspect of 21st century art: art everywhere, in multiple media and platforms.

In Summer 2015, Baseman commemorated Toby's 10th year as a formal artwork, blurring the lines of fine art and toy culture. HAPPY TOBY TO YOU! at Hong Kong Times Square showcased works from the first Toby art exhibition, photographs, and videos of Toby's adventurous world travels, and a birthday party sculptural installation of Toby and other Baseman characters. The exhibition was housed in another experiential environment conceptualized by Baseman and co-designed by Hjalti Karlsson of New York-based design firm karlssonwilker.

=== Fashion and toys ===
Baseman has translated many of his characters into toys and figurines, clothing, handbags, and other accessories. Prominent characters include Toby, Hotchachacha, "the little devil who steals haloes," and ChouChou who "dispels hate and fear, and oozes Creamy Gooey Love out of his belly button."

For toy, figurine, and limited edition projects, Baseman has collaborated with Critterbox, Toy2R, Kidrobot, Pretty in Plastic, The Loyal Subjects, and 3DRetro. Fashion collaborations include Swatch, Hobbs & Kent, Harvey's, Poketo, and Frau Blau.

In 2015, Baseman collaborated with Coach's Creative Director, Stuart Vevers, for the Baseman x COACH 2015 Spring Collection. The collection introduced an original series of Baseman characters (Buster Le Fauve, Emmanuel Hare Ray, Kiki, Buddy Boy, Butch), capturing the attitude of New York City and developed with the Coach girl in mind. In Summer 2015, Coach released the Baseman x Coach Wild Beast collection, featuring handbags, apparel, and accessories with Baseman's reimagined animal print.

=== Television ===
In 1998, Baseman co-created the Disney animated series Teacher's Pet with Bill and Cheri Steinkellner, which is about a dog who dresses as a boy because he wants to go to school. Baseman claims the character Spot was based on his dog at the time, Hubcaps. The series aired on ABC from 2000–2002, and the feature film of the same name came out in 2004.

The cartoon included the voice talents of Nathan Lane, Debra Jo Rupp, Jerry Stiller, David Ogden Stiers, Mae Whitman and Wallace Shawn. The film featured Kelsey Grammer, Paul Reubens and Estelle Harris.

Baseman won the Outstanding Individual in Animation Emmy for Production Design in 2003. The show also won two Emmy Awards: Outstanding Special Class Animated Program 2001 and 2002; Outstanding Performer in an Animated Program: Nathan Lane in 2001; and a BAFTA Emmy for Best International Children's Program in 2001.

Baseman also worked on an animated short for the Nickelodeon television series, KaBlam! The short was called The Louie & Louie Show, following the adventure of a hamster and a chameleon both named Louie. Baseman animated the sketch, and was directed by Tom McGrath. The short only aired once.

=== Performance ===
Baseman added performance art to his oeuvre in 2009 with "La Noche de la Fusion", a mythical holiday festival celebrating the bittersweetness of existence by fusing cultures and blurring the lines of reality. Shown in 2009 at the Corey Helford Gallery in Culver City, the event featured games, live music, dancers, and live models of Baseman's characters such as Toby, ChouChou, Hotchachacha, Skeleton Girl, Hickey Bat Girl, Bubble Girl, and Butterfly Girl.

In June 2010, Baseman presented "Giggle and Pop!" at the Los Angeles County Museum of Art. Live action costumed ChouChous played in the La Brea Tar Pits along with performers dressed as Baseman's WildGirls, who were renamed "Tar Pit Girls" for the occasion. The characters performed a dance choreographed by Sarah Elgart and the audience joined in with singer-songwriter Carina Round, who performed a song she composed for the event.

In July 2013, Toby's Secret Society came alive in "Secrets and Truths", a spectacular art performance created by Baseman with choreography by Elgart, costumes by Swinda Reichelt and music by LA- and Iceland-based Cassette Recordings Collective – arrangement by Scott Hackwith. Created in conjunction with Baseman's The Door is Always Open exhibition at the Skirball Cultural Center, the performance featured Veritas, the Goddess of Dreams, the Princess of Secrets, the Sacred Magi, and the WildGirls performing a special ritual that unveiled "Secrets and Truth."

In February 2015, Baseman created "The Secret Order of the Camellias", a site-specific installation and performative space at the Serpentine Gallery in London that commemorated the Baseman x Coach 2015 Spring collection. Showcasing the wild beast characters that protect secrets and represent loyalty and friendship, guests participated in a special rite of passage into the Secret Order by offering their deepest darkest dreams at the Shrine of Buster Le Fauve. Inspiring wonder and passion for life, Baseman initiated an adventurous few who faced their fears and desires.

=== Film ===
In July 2014, Baseman and director David Charles launched a Kickstarter campaign to fund one of Baseman's personally meaningful creative projects, a documentary feature titled Mythical Creatures.

The project began in 2012 when Baseman first traveled to Eastern Europe on a Fulbright Fellowship, detouring to his parents' hometowns which had not been visited by any family member in over 60 years. Mythical Creatures aims to connect the stories of the Holocaust to an entirely new generation through Baseman's parents' dark experiences during World War II. The film combines live action documentary elements, along with extensive animated sequences, and other storytelling techniques. Baseman says, "It's really about taking all of the different narratives from the myths I've been told and mixing them with my characters to try and find my truth," he says. "We're not doing it in a straightforward historical way. It's really an exploration of my psyche."

Mythical Creatures is supported by the Sundance Institute's New Frontier Story Lab and the Museum of the Holocaust in Los Angeles.

== Selected solo exhibitions ==
- Memento Moa, Suter Art Gallery, Nelson, New Zealand, 2023
- Nine Lives, Wrong Gallery, Beijing, China, 2023
- Imaginary Friends, Tauranga Art Gallery, New Zealand The Purr Room, 2019
- The Purr Room, The Other Art Fair, London, UK, 2018
- The Purr Room, The Other Art Fair Los Angeles, Santa Monica, CA, 2018
- HAPPY TOBY TO YOU! Hong Kong Times Square, Hong Kong, China, 2015
- The Door is Always Open, Shanghai chi K11 Art Museum, Shanghai, China, 2014
- The Door is Always Open, Museum of Contemporary Art, Taipei, Taiwan, 2014
- Mythical Homeland, Shulamit Gallery, Venice, CA, 2013
- The Door is Always Open, Skirball Cultural Center, Los Angeles, CA, 2013
- Vicious, Antonio Colombo Arte Contemporanea, Milan, Italy, 2012
- Walking through Walls, Jonathan LeVine Gallery, New York, NY, 2011
- La Noche de la Fusión, Corey Helford Gallery, Culver City, CA, 2009
- Sacrificing of the Cake, Urbanix, Tel Aviv, Israel, 2009
- Knowledge Comes From Gas Release, Iguapop Gallery, Barcelona, Spain, 2008
- Hide and Seek in the Forest of ChouChou, Billy Shire Fine Arts, Los Angeles, CA, 2007
- I Melt in your Presence, Modernism, San Francisco, CA, 2007
- Venison, Mercado Gallery, Barcelona, Spain, 2006
- Manifestations of Desire, OX-OP Gallery, Minneapolis, MN, 2006
- Bedtime for Toby, Second Street Gallery, Charlottesville, VA, 2005
- A Moment Ago, Everything was Beautiful Installation, Pasadena Museum of California Art, Pasadena, CA, 2005
- The Garden of Unearthly Delights, Jonathan LeVine Gallery, New York, NY, 2005
- For the Love of Toby, Billy Shire Fine Arts, Los Angeles, CA, 2005
- Happy Idiot and Other Paintings about Unattainable Beauty, Earl McGrath Gallery, New York, NY, 2004
- Open Wounds and Other Paintings about Vulnerability, OX-OP Gallery, Minneapolis, 2003
- I am Your Piñata and Other Paintings about Love and Sacrifice, La Luz de Jesus, Los Angeles, CA, 2002
- Dumb Luck and Other Paintings About Lack of Control, Mendenhall Gallery, Los Angeles, CA, 1999

== Bibliography ==
2015
The Door is Always Open (Shanghai chi K11 art museum catalogue)
The Door is Always Open (MOCA Taipei catalogue)

2014
Pictoplasma-Character Portraits
100 Illustrators

2013
Gary Baseman: The Door is Always Open
Mono Baseman

2011
La Luz de Jesus 25: The Little Gallery that Could
Heroes & Villains
Delusional: The Story of the Jonathan LeVine Gallery
The 3D Artbook

2010
Graphic: Inside the Sketchbooks of the World's Great Graphic Designers
I Am Plastic, Too: The Next Generation of Toys
Toy Design

2009
Prepare for Pictopia
Sketch Book

2008
Dying of Thirst
The Upset, Young Contemporary Art
Knowledge Comes with Gas Release

2007
My Thirst for Venison

2006
Dot Dot Dash
Illustrations Now!
Full Vinyl: The Subversive Art of Designer Toys

2005
Strong Stuff: Herakles and His Labors
Illustration Now!

2004
Dumb Luck
