= Teacher's Pet (2004 film) =

2004 film directed by Timothy Björklund

- Theatrical release poster
- Directed by: Timothy Björklund
- Written by: Bill Steinkellner; Cheri Steinkellner
- Based on: Teacher's Pet by: Gary Baseman; Bill Steinkellner; Cheri Steinkellner
- Produced by: Stephen Swofford
- Starring: Nathan Lane; Kelsey Grammer; Shaun Fleming; Debra Jo Rupp; David Ogden Stiers; Jerry Stiller
- Edited by: Nancy Frazen
- Music by: Stephen James Taylor
- Production companies: Walt Disney Television Animation; Toon City Animation
- Distributed by: Buena Vista Pictures Distribution (Note: Released through the Walt Disney Pictures banner.)
- Release date: January 16, 2004
- Running time: 74 minutes
- Country: United States
- Language: English
- Budget: $10 million
- Box office: $6.5 million

Teacher's Pet is a 2004 American animated musical comedy film, which serves as the finale of the 2000 television series of the same name created by artist Gary Baseman. Produced by Walt Disney Television Animation and distributed by Buena Vista Pictures, the film was directed by series director Timothy Björklund and written by series creators Bill and Cheri Steinkellner. The film was released theatrically on January 16, 2004, to mostly positive reviews. It was a box office failure, grossing $6.5 million on a $10 million budget. The film is dedicated to Baseman's dog, Hubcaps, who died while the film was in production.

== Plot ==
For the past year, a dog named Spot has impersonated a boy named Scott and attended school with his master, fourth-grader Leonard Helperman. Spot desperately wants to become a real human boy, much to the chagrin of Leonard, who just wants a normal dog. Leonard's mother Mary Lou is invited to compete in the "Teacher of the Year" finals in Sunny Southern Florida, and granted use of the principal's RV to travel there under the condition that no dogs are allowed. Leonard sadly bids farewell to Spot as they leave him with a pet sitter.

Watching a television talk show, Spot discovers a scientist from Southern Florida named Dr. Ivan Krank who claims he can turn animals into human beings. Determined to meet Krank and become a boy, Spot chases down the RV, disguises himself as Scott, and convinces Mrs. Helperman to allow him to travel with them.

Back at home, the Helpermans' bird Pretty Boy and cat Mr. Jolly learn from a follow-up episode of the talk show that Krank cannot actually turn animals into people, but rather into awkward and grotesque hybrid creatures. Pretty Boy decides they must follow after Spot to warn him, assuring Mr. Jolly that they can be tough despite their size.

Arriving in Florida, Mrs. Helperman heads directly to the Teacher of the Year finals, leaving the boys alone, and Spot convinces Leonard to go with him to Krank's lab. Despite Leonard's apprehensions, Krank agrees to turn Spot human, gleefully anticipating the respect the scientific community has always denied him.

Spot wakes up to find that he is indeed human, but because dogs age faster than humans, he is a fully grown man rather than a boy. Krank wants to capture and exhibit the "dog-man" around the world, but they break free. In need of a new wardrobe, "Scott" uses his dog senses to locate a lost dog and claim a cash reward, and he and Leonard enjoy a day on the town.

Scott and Leonard return to the RV to meet Mrs. Helperman, making up a story to explain the disappearance of Scott-the-boy and the appearance of Scott-the-man. Mrs. Helperman invites Scott in for coffee and soon begins to fall for him. Scott considers marrying Leonard's mother so they can all stay together, but Leonard refuses to allow it. Scott angrily states that he is no longer Leonard's dog, and leaves as Leonard takes back his tags and collar.

The other pets arrive in Florida and help Leonard realize that he should support Scott's dream. Leonard concludes that the only way they can all be together is for him to become Scott's dog, and leaves for Krank's lab. A regretful Scott returns to reconcile with Leonard and follows him.

Krank plans to turn Leonard into a dog and capture Scott to exhibit both of them. Scott arrives at the lab and destroys Krank's machine. In the ensuing chaos, the machine turns Krank into a mouse and Scott back to his original dog form. Leonard and Spot reunite, and Spot decides that he is proud to be a dog.

== Cast ==
- Nathan Lane as Spot Helperman / Scott Leadready II / Scott Manly-Manning
- Kelsey Grammer as Dr. Ivan Krank
- Shaun Fleming as Leonard Amadeus Helperman
- Debra Jo Rupp as Mary Lou Moira Angela Darling Helperman
- David Ogden Stiers as Mr. Jolly
- Jerry Stiller as Pretty Boy
- Paul Reubens as Dennis
- Megan Mullally as Adele
- Rob Paulsen as Ian Wazselewski
- Wallace Shawn as Principal Crosby Strickler
- Jay Thomas as Barry Anger
- Estelle Harris as Mrs. Boogin

Returning voice actors from the series include Mae Whitman and Lauren Tom as students Leslie Dunkling and Younghee Mandlebom and Pamela S. Adlon as students Tyler, Taylor and Trevor.

Genie Ann Francis and Anthony Geary voice soap opera characters Marsha and John, as well as their telenovela equivalents Marcia and Juan. Rosalyn Landor voices The Blue Fairy in the opening sequence and writer David Maples voices Beefeater.

Timothy Stack portrays the owner of a dog Spot rescues and Emma Steinkellner plays his daughter, while Ken Swofford voices Officer White and Kevin M. Richardson voices a conductor.

== Production ==
The film was animated by Walt Disney Television Animation and Toon City. On its story, instead of telling the original Pinocchio story, the filmmakers thought of putting a twist on the tale, which relates to the theme of the movie: "Be careful what you wish for." Nathan Lane returned to reprise his role as Spot Helperman/Scott Leadready II after working on the musical The Producers. The movie itself serves as the series finale to the television series.

== Music ==
Original songs performed in the film include:

No.	Title	Writer(s)	Performer(s)	Length
1.	"I Wanna Be a Boy"	Brian Woodburry & Peter Lurye	Nathan Lane, Shaun Fleming & Chorus
2.	"A Boy Needs a Dog"	Randy Petersen & Kevin Quinn	Fleming & Lane
3.	"A Whole Bunch of World"	Cheri Steinkellner, Petersen & Quinn	Debra Jo Rupp, Lane & Fleming
4.	"Small But Mighty"	Petersen & Quinn	Jerry Stiller & David Ogden Stiers
5.	"I, Ivan Krank"	Steinkellner, Petersen & Quinn	Kelsey Grammer
6.	"Take the Money and Run"	Steinkellner, Petersen & Quinn	Jack Sheldon
7.	"I'm Moving On"	Steinkellner, Petersen & Quinn	Rupp, Lane, Fleming, Grammer, Paul Reubens, Megan Mullally, Stiller, Stiers & Chorus
8.	"A Boy Needs a Dog (Reprise)"	Petersen & Quinn	Lane & Fleming
9.	"Proud to Be a Dog"	Woodburry, Lurye, Steinkellner, Petersen & Quinn	Lane, Fleming & Chorus
10.	"Teacher's Pet"	Joe Lubin	Christy Carlson Romano

The musical score of the film was composed and conducted by Stephen James Taylor, who previously wrote the minimal score for the television series.

== Release ==
Teacher's Pet was originally planned for a September 5, 2003 release before getting rescheduled for February 2004. The film was then moved up to January 16, 2004.

About a week before release, Toon Disney aired a four-hour marathon of episodes for viewers to catch up on the series.

=== Box office ===
Over its four-day opening weekend, the film made $3.6 million in 2,027 theaters, $1,777 per theater, making it one of the lowest openings in history. By the end of its run, the film had grossed $6.5 million.

=== Critical reception ===
On Rotten Tomatoes the film holds an approval rating of 76% based on 74 reviews, with an average rating of 6.6/10. The site's critics consensus reads: "Despite its short running time, Teacher's Pet is a witty and irreverent family film." On Metacritic, which uses a weighted average, the film has a score of 74 out of 100, based on 26 critics, indicating "generally favorable reviews". Audiences polled by CinemaScore gave the film an average grade of "B−" on an A+ to F scale.

Entertainment Weekly gave the film a B−. Common Sense Media gave the film four out of five stars, claiming it to be "Fast, fresh, funny and entertaining for all", but they also give warnings for minor potty humor and violence.

== Home media ==
Teacher's Pet was released June 15, 2004, on VHS and DVD.

Deleted scenes

The deleted scenes are in animatic form as they were either incomplete in time for the film or replaced with a different scene.

- "Pretty Boy and Mr. Jolly On the Road": Pretty Boy and Mr. Jolly end up traveling numerous ways to Florida to save Spot and Leonard.
- "NEATO Awards": Spot, Pretty Boy, and Mr. Jolly cheer on Mrs. Helperman as she accepts the award at the "NEATO" awards. Pretty Boy claims that they cannot get home on the RV since they are supposed to be home (Mrs. Helperman does not realize that they are in Florida also) as Spot quickly figures out a way to get them home.
