= Teacher's Pet (TV series) =

Disney animated television series

- Genre: Comedy
- Created by: Gary Baseman; Bill Steinkellner; Cheri Steinkellner
- Directed by: Timothy Björklund; Jamie Thomason (season 1); Julie Morgavi (season 2); Alfred Gimeno (season 2); Donald V. MacKinnon (season 2); Ennio Torresan Jr. (season 2)
- Voices of: Nathan Lane; Shaun Fleming; Debra Jo Rupp; Jerry Stiller; David Ogden Stiers; Wallace Shawn; Kevin Schon (Note: He took over as the voice for Spot/Scott in six episodes during the second season.)
- Theme music composer: Brian Woodbury; Peter Lurye
- Opening theme: "I Wanna Be a Boy"
- Composers: Stephen James Taylor; Brian Woodbury; Peter Lurye
- Country of origin: United States
- Original language: English
- No. of seasons: 2
- No. of episodes: 39 (47 segments)

Production
- Executive producers: Gary Baseman; Bill Steinkellner; Cheri Steinkellner; Michael Price (season 1); Jess Winfield (season 2)
- Producers: Michele Furuichi-Yost (season 1); Nancylee Myatt (season 2)
- Editors: John Royer (season 1); Susan Edmundson (season 2)
- Running time: 22 minutes
- Production company: Walt Disney Television Animation (Note: Animation outsourced to Wang Film Productions and Toon City Animation.)

Original release
- Network: ABC
- Release: September 9, 2000 – February 9, 2002
- Network: Toon Disney
- Release: January 11 – May 10, 2002

Teacher's Pet, also known as Disney's Teacher's Pet, is an American animated television series produced by Walt Disney Television Animation. The series follows a 9-year-old boy and his dog who dresses up as a boy.

Created by Gary Baseman—the artistic designer for the Cranium board game—Bill Steinkellner, and Cheri Steinkellner, it was broadcast on ABC from 2000–2002, and finishing its run on Toon Disney in 2002. A stand-alone feature-length film adaptation was theatrically released in the United States and Canada on January 16, 2004, which serves as a finale to the television series.

== Premise ==
The series follows Leonard Helperman, a 9-year-old boy in the 4th grade, who lives in embarrassment because his mother, Mary Helperman, is his teacher. Because of this, he is often mocked and called a "teacher's pet", but he wants to be considered normal. Meanwhile, his dog, Spot, misses Leonard while he is at school, and yearns to be a human boy. So on the first day of the school year, he decides to come to class disguised as a new student named Scott Leadready II, who quickly becomes the most popular, influential kid in school. However, Leonard eventually finds out his secret. Although he disapproves of this at first, he allows Spot to continue attending school.

== Characters ==
=== Main cast ===
- Spot Helperman/Scott Leadready II: (Nathan Lane; Kevin Schon in eight episodes) Leonard's dog. He dresses up as a boy and attends Leonard's school. He's the most popular and doesn't want anyone to know he's really a dog. Usually at the end of the show, he will compare the episode’s moral or lesson to a historical event.
- Leonard Helperman: (Shaun Fleming) Spot's master and best friend. He's somewhat unpopular because his mom's the teacher, since the kids think it gives him an unfair advantage. But the sudden enrolment of Spot has helped him become more confident to a decent degree, due to the former's immediate popularity.
- Mary Lou Helperman: (Debra Jo Rupp) Leonard's mother. She is the perky and eccentric teacher of Leonard's class and embarrasses him. Just like all the other humans, she is too ignorant to be suspicious of Spot or tell that he and Scott are the same person.
- Mr. Jolly: (David Ogden Stiers) Leonard's neurotic orange cat. He is afraid of the outside world and stays at home with the family's parrot. He's in love with the principal's cat but his fear of the outside world (and her evil nature) prevents any chance of romance.
- Pretty Boy: (Jerry Stiller) Leonard's wisecracking green canary. He calls Spot "Dog Breath". He's an honest guy and loyal friend but can be mean, rude and grumpy to everyone. He sometimes bullies Jolly because he’s scared of everything.

=== Recurring ===
- Principal Strickler: (Wallace Shawn) The strait-laced principal at Leonard and Spot's school. He owns a cat named Talullah. He hates dogs because one nipped off half his thumb.
- Ian Wazselewski: (Rob Paulsen) The class weirdo. His mom is the school nurse, so he thinks he has a special connection with Leonard. He's a guy with a chronic upper-respiratory infection...a guy who keeps his scab collection in his desk. Everyone calls him "Eww-an".
- Leslie Dunkling: (Mae Whitman) Leonard's best friend and crush. She is very nice and lives next door to the Helpermans.
- Tyler, Taylor, and Trevor: (Pamela Adlon) Three of the coolest kids in school. Leonard wishes he was as cool as they. They usually participate in typical slacker activities like skateboarding. They sometimes pick on Leonard, but usually they are more socially tolerant of him thanks to Spot being his best friend.
- Younghee Mandlebom: (Lauren Tom) A Korean girl of the class who is Leslie's best friend. She is often mean to Leonard, but she still cares for him and as a matter of fact, she is secretly in love with him.
- Chelsey and Kelsey: (Cree Summer) Twins of the class who are friends with Leslie. They are usually stuck-up and think they are more important than everyone else, but they always bicker with each other. Leonard tries to get their attention, but usually fails.
- Moltar: Ian's invisible friend. Usually Ian likes to do the weird stuff he does with him.

== Episodes ==
=== Series overview ===
Season	Segments	Episodes		Originally released		
Season	Segments	Episodes		First released	Last released	Network
1	17	13		September 9, 2000	January 13, 2001	ABC
2	9	26	8	September 22, 2001	February 9, 2002	ABC
2	21	26	18	January 11, 2002	May 10, 2002	Toon Disney

=== Season 1 (2000–01) ===
Note: The first season aired on ABC's One Saturday Morning. All episodes in this season were directed by Timothy Björklund.

No. overall	No. in season	Title	Written by	Storyboard by	Original release date	Prod. code
1	1	"Muttamorphosis"	Bill Steinkellner & Cheri Steinkellner	Timothy Björklund	September 9, 2000	001
Spot the Dog decides once and for all to go to school, and so he becomes Scott Leadready II, top student of his master Leonard Helperman's fourth grade class.
2	2	"Pet Project"	Bill Steinkellner & Cheri Steinkellner	Fred Gonzales & Celia Kendrick	September 16, 2000	002
Spot tries to pass Mr. Jolly off as his pet cat and Leonard writes about Pretty Boy when the kids have to write and recite an essay on their pets. Guest stars: Pat Musick as Mary Beth and David Sabella as Pretty Boy's singing voice
3	3	"Movin' on Pup"	Bill Steinkellner & Cheri Steinkellner	Celia Kendrick	September 23, 2000	N/A-003
3	3	"Escaping Dog Trick"	Ford Riley	Fred Gonzales	September 23, 2000	N/A-003
Scott does well enough on the N.A.S.T.Y. to get promoted to the fifth grade, but finds out that the fifth grade is much more of a challenge than he had anticipated. Mrs. Helperman thinks Spot's run away when he sneaks away as Scott to buy ice cream with Leonard. Once Spot returns home, Mrs. Helperman has an electronic fence set up, which restricts him from going to school, causing him to mope. Guest stars: Clancy Brown as the Fifth Grade Teacher, Patrick Warburton as Officer Doggytime and Brad Renfro as Miles
4	4	"A Lick is Still a Kiss"	Bill Steinkellner & Cheri Steinkellner	Chuck Klein & Melissa Suber	September 30, 2000	ABC-04
Leonard mentions to the cool kids that Leslie uses pink lemonade lip gloss with a hint o' mint, which he had learned from Spot, but that turns into a rumor that he had kissed Leslie on the lips. It doesn't get any better when Principal Stricker threatens him (along with Scott later on when he defends Leonard) to be sent to the "School For Losers". Guest star: Rita Wilson as Cosmetics Saleswoman
5	5	"Being Mrs. Leadready"	Laura McCreary	Chuck Klein & Melissa Suber	October 7, 2000	005
Scott needs to find someone to play his mother for parent-teacher night and eventually has to play not only his mother but himself at the same time after being invited over for dinner. Song - "Spot's Lament" (Original & Reprise)
6	6	"Let Sleeping-Over Dogs Lie"	Bill Steinkellner & Cheri Steinkellner	Mike Diederich & Fred Gonzales	October 28, 2000	ABC-06
6	6	"Costume Pity Party"	Michael Price	Norma Klinger	October 28, 2000	ABC-06
Scott and Leonard are invited to Ian's birthday/slumber party, and Leonard's scared since he doesn't know what to expect from a slumber party, especially since it's at Ian's house. On Halloween day, Leonard explains that he doesn't wear costumes anymore for the season since someone had bullied him the previous year (It's later found out that said bully was made fun of previously for wearing a disco costume the year prior to that). In the meantime, Spot's cover nearly is blown when his costume falls apart and appears as his actual self as he arrives at school, but everyone believes that he's actually in costume as a dog, so he goes with it and pretends to be Scott in a dog costume, but things go awry when they are told to take off their costumes for later. Song - "Happy Happy Birthday!" Guest stars: Fred Willard as Mr. Wazselewski, Clancy Brown as the Fifth Grade Teacher and Brad Garrett as Dutch Calenza
7	7	"Scott's Honor"	Michael Price	Fred Gonzales & Celia Kendrick	November 4, 2000	007
Spot tries to prove to Leonard that he can succeed as a Junior Boy Ranger, which Leonard thinks he can't do because dogs are color blind. Song - "Junior Boy Rangers" Guest star: Marc Wilmore as Troop Leader Steve Knicke
8	8	"Fifi"	Bill Steinkellner & Cheri Steinkellner	Chuck Klein & Melissa Suber	November 11, 2000	ABC-08
When the fourth grade class goes to the circus, Spot falls in love with and pursues Fifi, a circus acrobat poodle. He is successful, but as she is in a traveling circus, she insists that Spot should come with her too. Guest star: Bernadette Peters as Fifi
9	9	"Bad to the Bone"	Jim Patterson & Stephen Leff	Fred Gonzales	November 18, 2000	FO-09
9	9	"Always Knock the Postman Twice"	Story by : Gary Baseman; Teleplay by : Ford Riley	Celia Kendrick	November 18, 2000	FO-09
Scott thinks he's been branded a bad'un when Mrs. Helperman writes him up on his permanent record for sticking his head out the school bus window, so ends up showing them all at school how bad he can be. When Scott makes slanderous insults against a mailman during "Career Day" (Going back to his dog instincts) and ends up getting in trouble for it, Leonard tries to change Spot's prejudice against mailmen by explaining to him all the mistakes that Spot and the other dogs see about mailmen before he gets himself into more trouble at school. Song - "No One Does Bad Quite As Good As Me"
10	10	"You Can't Bite City Hall"	Bill Steinkellner & Cheri Steinkellner	Chuck Klein & Melissa Suber	December 2, 2000	ABC-10
The city wants to turn the dog park into a skateboard park and Scott supports this until his dog friends and enemies inform him of their perspective of the park, leaving Spot confused to decide which side he's going to be on. Song - "Dog and Skateboard Park"
11	11	"A Dog for All Seasons"	Story by : Ford Riley; Written by : Ford Riley & Michael Price	Fred Gonzales & Celia Kendrick	December 16, 2000	011
Spot tries to find out if dogs have any holiday traditions. Meanwhile, Mrs. Helperman has to write up a new holiday school play that includes all the kids' religious traditions, but finds it harder than she expected. Song - "Season Of Love" Guest stars: Fred Willard as Mr. Wazselewski, Tress MacNeille as Librarian and John Mahoney as Tim Tim Tim
12	12	"Tallulahpalooza"	Bill Steinkellner & Cheri Steinkellner	Chuck Klein & Melissa Suber	January 6, 2001	012
Mrs. Helperman agrees to be a pet sitter for Principal Stickler's cat Tallulah. This strikes conflict with Leonard and Spot as they want to leave the house to go out for Laser Tag and pizza, but they both feel that Tallulah is spying on them, and might catch on to Spot's secret. Meanwhile, Pretty Boy has a hard time trying to avoid being eaten by Tallulah and Mr. Jolly falls in love with the cat. Guest star: Tress MacNeille as Tallulah
13	13	"Saving Mr. Jolly"	Cade Chilcoat	Celia Kendrick	January 13, 2001	N/A-013
13	13	"Rule of Paw"	Ford Riley	Fred Gonzales	January 13, 2001	N/A-013
Pretty Boy and Mr. Jolly both think the other is missing so they go to school in search of Leonard's help and things get worse when they do find each other and Tallulah finds them too. In the meantime, Leonard, Scott, and the rest of the class participate in the "VIPATOTY" fitness test. When Scott takes his new role as playground safety monitor a bit too seriously, Leonard intentionally breaks a bunch of small offenses to make a point that his new rules are ridiculous. Scott doesn't like this one bit and it lands Leonard in Student Council Court. Guest star: Tress MacNeille as Tallulah

=== Season 2 (2001–02) ===
No. overall	No. in season	Title	Directed by	Written by	Storyboard by	Original release date	Prod. code
14	1	"Never Take Candy from a Kindergartner"	Timothy Björklund	Bill Steinkellner & Cheri Steinkellner	Celia Kendrick & Chuck Klein	September 22, 2001	1C03-205
Leonard feels very guilty when he lets kindergartner Emma get a crush on him and feeds him free samples of candy from her dad's store, so Scott tries to help out, only to get roped into the same situation. Meanwhile. Pretty Boy and Mr. Jolly both annoy each other with their habits (Pretty Boy being his seed bell and Mr. Jolly with his scratching post,) so they bet each other that they can do without the thing that they love. Note: The episode was originally planned to premiere on September 15, 2001, but was delayed due to the coverage of the September 11 attacks.
15	2	"A Few Good Boys"	Timothy Björklund	Michael Price	Tina Kügler & Bob Onorato	September 29, 2001	1C03-203
Both Scott and Leonard get Junior Boy Ranger community service assignments that they absolutely can't stand. Guest stars: Kath Soucie as Baby Kittens and Marc Wilmore as Troop Leader Steve Knicke
16	3	"Bad Fur Day"	Timothy Björklund	Story by : Gary Baseman; Written by : David Maples	Troy Adomitis, Karen Carnegie, Raymond S. Persi & Barry Vodos	October 6, 2001	1C03-212
Spot makes fun of Leonard's bad haircut until he himself winds up with a bad grooming that could blow his cover.
17	4	"The Tale of the Telltale Taffy"	Alfred Gimeno	David Maples	Karen Carnegie, Bob Onorato & Barry Vodos	October 27, 2001	1C03-225
While trick-or-treating, Scott convinces Leonard to go across the street to get candy since their street is only offering fruits and vegetables, but both of them start to feel guilty since Leonard had promised to his mom previously that he wouldn't go across the street. Meanwhile, after Leonard takes in a stray black cat from out of the rain, Pretty Boy and Jolly suspect the cat of being a vampire after reading up on vampire stories online. Song - "It's About The Candy" Guest stars: Tim Curry as Spooky and Kevin Schon as the singing voice of Spot/Scott (Note: While Kevin Schon would voice Spot/Scott in many later episodes that aired on Toon Disney (and one on ABC), Kevin first voiced Spot/Scott during the song "It's About The Candy")
18	5	"Don't Count Your Chickies Before They Hatch"	Alfred Gimeno	Nicholas Hope & Jessie Jones	Fred Gonzales & Ennio Torresan Jr.	November 3, 2001	1C03-215
Scott is thrilled at a chance to go the upcoming air show, but this conflicts with his class assignment to watch over chicken eggs, so in the meantime, Leonard videotapes the whole thing for Scott so he can still watch the airshow later on. Eventually Scott has to leave the house to retrieve a light bulb when the chickens incubators light bulb dies, but on the way to the light bulb store, Scott is extremely tempted to go to the airshow. In the meantime, after complaining that he feels that he has no purpose in life, Mr. Jolly finds purpose by lying on top of the eggs to keep them warm.
19	6	"Strickler's Pet"	Timothy Björklund	Mark Steen	Chuck Klein	January 11, 2002 (Toon Disney)	1C03-206
19	6	"Fresh 'n' Frozey Chocolaccino"	Timothy Björklund	Story by : George McGrath; Written by : Nancylee Myatt	Karen Carnegie, Celia Kendrick & Chuck Klein	January 11, 2002 (Toon Disney)	1C03-208
Strickler makes a stupid promise to get the students to read 2000 books in one month, and makes Scott "Junior Deputy Vice Principal" to keep him from helping the kids reach that goal so he won't have to shave his head bald and paint it purple. Scott and Leonard get the brilliant idea of selling their "Fresh 'n' Frozey Chocolaccino" drink to raise money to buy a Steel Sabre scooter, but things go awry once they run out of ingredients and end up selling ice.: "Fresh 'n' Frozey Chocolaccino" was the first episode to feature Kevin Schon voicing Spot/Scott as at the time, Nathan Lane was working on the Mel Brooks Broadway musical, The Producers; although Nathan Lane still voices Spot/Scott in various episodes afterwards given that many of them aired out of order.
20	7	"The Grass Seed is Always Greener..."	Timothy Björklund	Bill Steinkellner & Cheri Steinkellner	Celia Kendrick, Zac Moncrief & Melissa Suber	January 18, 2002 (Toon Disney)	1C03-207
Pretty Boy's migrating instincts kick in and he flies the coop. Song - "Wormface And Skelebony Opening"
21	8	"No Substitutions, Please"	Alfred Gimeno	Nicholas Hope & Jessie Jones	Fred Gonzales & Tina Kügler	January 19, 2002	1C03-223
Mrs. Helperman catches a cold and so turns her class over to a substitute. Everybody loves her except Scott due to his canine super-sense. Meanwhile, Mr. Jolly, trying to fill in for Spot, tries to assist with Mrs. Helperman and her cold. Guest star: Grey DeLisle as Ms. Dewygood
22	9	"Don't It Make My Brown Eyes Green"	Timothy Björklund	Bill Steinkellner & Cheri Steinkellner	Fred Gonzales & Ennio Torresan Jr.	January 25, 2002 (Toon Disney)	1C03-211
Scott gets jealous when Leonard makes up a popular game based on the fetch game Spot's played with Leonard.
23	10	"Party Animal"	Alfred Gimeno	Story by : Cade Chilcoat; Written by : Billiam Coronel	Celia Kendrick & Chuck Klein	January 26, 2002	1C03-210
23	10	"Mr. Jolly: Man...or Mouser?"	Timothy Björklund & Alfred Gimeno	Bill Steinkellner & Cheri Steinkellner	Ennio Torresan Jr.	January 26, 2002	1C03-224
Scott secretly sets up a surprise party for Leonard's birthday, but Leonard doesn't seem interested. Leonard bets that Mr. Jolly can catch wiseacre mouse Margarita Ratoncita in five minutes. Guest star: Nika Futterman as Margarita Ratoncita
24	11	"What's Sweat Got to Do with It?"	Timothy Björklund	Jim Staahl & Jim Fisher	Zac Moncrief & Melissa Suber	February 1, 2002 (Toon Disney)	1C03-218
Leonard's paired with Leslie in a square-dance performance, but he keeps getting sweaty palms when he's near Leslie. Meanwhile, when Pretty Boy finds out that Mr. Jolly recent stomach problems stem from having milk, he assists in helping him from having anymore dairy. Song - "Trip Your Partner Promenade"
25	12	"Dogfight"	Timothy Björklund	David Maples	Tina Kügler & Bob Onorato	February 8, 2002 (Toon Disney)	1C03-217
When Scott and Leonard argue over a basketball loss the other kids force them to fight about it. Meanwhile, Mr. Jolly tries to prove how ferocious he can be after Pretty Boy points out how domesticated he is as a cat.
26	13	"Taint Valentine's Day"	Ennio Torresan Jr.	Billiam Coronel	Fred Gonzales & Tina Kügler	February 9, 2002	1C03-228
Nobody seems to love Leonard, especially on Valentines day, so Scott secretly sends many valentines to Leonard to boost his confidence, but his plot blows up in Leonard's face as the girls look over the valentines and find out that they're all written the same, so it's up to Scott to fix the mess he created. Meanwhile, Mr. Jolly helps Pretty Boy out with getting a lady bird on Valentines day.
27	14	"Science Not Fair"	Donald V. MacKinnon	Billiam Coronel	Troy Adomitis, Karen Carnegie & Raymond S. Persi	February 15, 2002	1C03-214
Mrs. Helperman mistakenly believes that Scott's fancy photosynthesis science project is Leonard's project. Song - "Photosynthesis"
28	15	"To Bee or Not To Bee"	Donald V. MacKinnon	David Maples	Celia Kendrick & Chuck Klein	February 22, 2002	1C03-221
Scott panics when he finds that his spelling bee rival Eric Mark Kravitz is fanatically devoted to studying for the bee. Song - "The Tiny Flugelhorn"
29	16	"One Dog's Junk"	Alfred Gimeno	Jim Staahl & Jim Fisher	Wendy Grieb, Tina Kügler, Zac Moncrief & Melissa Suber	March 1, 2002	1C03-220
Spot is completely distraught when Leonard puts his beloved Squeeky Burger Toy in a yard sale, and nearly has a complete nervous breakdown when he finds out that Ian bought it and won't give it back. In the meantime, Pretty Boy and Jolly sell stuff online and knowing that Spot is really distraught about his loss, they both decide to buy him a new Squeeky Burger Toy online, but they keep outbidding each other over and over again, not realizing that they are both trying to bid for the same toy for Spot.
30	17	"Team Scott"	Donald V. MacKinnon	Billiam Coronel	Fred Gonzales	March 8, 2002	1C03-N/A
30	17	"Take Me Out of the Ball Game"	Timothy Björklund	Story by : Jonathan Goldstein & Roger Schulman; Written by : John Reyonlds & Mike Samonek	Celia Kendrick	March 8, 2002	1C03-N/A
The East Westland JBR Troops let Scott compete and win in all the JBR Confab events all by himself so they don't lose for the 10th year in a row. But things go downhill when the troop ends up going the wrong way on the final test to Little Rock Mountain. Scott fanatically tries to turn Leonard into a great baseball player when Scott is prohibited from playing himself because he's only been a student for eight months. Song - "Team With A Capital 'T'" Guest stars: Marc Wilmore as Troop Leader Steve Knicke, Bob Uecker as The Narrator and Fred Willard as Mr. Wazselewski
31	18	"Inspector Leadready II"	Timothy Björklund & Ennio Torresan Jr.	Jim Staahl & Jim Fisher	Zac Moncrief & Melissa Suber	March 15, 2002	1C03-227
When Leslie's map of Brazil is found broken and Leonard is at the scene of the crime, Scott becomes Scotlock Holmes to clear Leonard's name.
32	19	"The Turkey That Came To Dinner"	Ennio Torresan Jr.	Bill Steinkellner & Cheri Steinkellner	Chuck Klein & Raymond S. Persi	March 22, 2002	1C03-229
The pets have to spend Thanksgiving in the porch when Grandma Rose visits, bringing with her a live turkey for dinner. Meanwhile, Leonard gets addicted to an old game that his grandmother had brought over to play. Song - "Thanksgiving Blessings" Guest star: Betty White as Grandma Rose
33	20	"Double Dog Dare"	Alfred Gimeno	Jess Winfield	Wendy Grieb & Celia Kendrick	March 29, 2002	1C03-226
In a Truth or Dare game, Leonard is dared to tell everyone who his favorite girl in the class is. If he admits that it's Leslie then everybody might laugh at him and it'll ruin him and Leslie's friendship and if he lies and says he has a crush on Younghee, then he might break Leslie's heart, so he decides to try a super hard dare in place of telling the truth. Song - "The Litterbox Aria" Guest star: Sydney Walsh as Mrs. Sproutwell
34	21	"Attack of the 50 Inch Girl"	Ennio Torresan Jr.	Bill Steinkellner & Cheri Steinkellner	Zac Moncrief & Melissa Suber	April 5, 2002	1C03-N/A
New girl Fred Bitters picks on Scott and Leonard so much that Spot decides to quit going to school. Guest star: Nancy Cartwright as Fred Bitters
35	22	"The Flipper"	Ennio Torresan Jr.	Billiam Coronel	Karen Carnegie & Bob Onorato	April 12, 2002	1C03-231
After Scott teaches Leonard, he becomes the Flipper when he becomes an expert at flipping cards into a circle. But after a bit of tension between the two, they have a final showdown. In the meantime, Mr. Jolly makes buildings out of cards as Pretty Boy does various methods to blow it down. Song - "The Flipping Motion"
36	23	"The Blight Before Christmas"	Alfred Gimeno	David Maples	Celia Kendrick, Chuck Klein & Raymond S. Persi	April 19, 2002	1C03-233
While Leonard hopes to get a Mach III Game Command for Christmas, Spot searches for a lost dog hoping to collect a $500.00 reward to buy stuff for himself. Guest stars: Jeff Bennett as Moby Dog and Gabrielle Carteris as Charlotte Dog
37	24	"All About Eavesdropping"	Ennio Torresan Jr.	Jim Staahl & Jim Fisher	Celia Kendrick, Raymond S. Persi & Barry Vodos	April 26, 2002	1C03-232
Scott convinces Leslie to allow Leonard and himself to perform a magic act for her birthday party. After the act, they start to gather their stuff as Scott conveniences Leonard to eavesdrop on the girls to find out what "girls really like" for the boys at the school to know about.: This is the last episode that featured Nathan Lane as Spot/Scott.; Guest star: Jeff Bennett as Myron the Magnifico and Pat Musick as Mrs. Dunkling and Intercom
38	25	"The Nose Knows"	Alfred Gimeno	Jim Staahl & Jim Fisher	Chuck Klein & Zac Moncrief	May 3, 2002	1C03-N/A
38	25	"Don't Bite the Hound That Feeds You"	Alfred Gimeno	Story by : Billiam Coronel; Written by : David Maples	Melissa Suber	May 3, 2002	1C03-N/A
Scott insists that the cafeteria's Thursday Surprise is the dog food he ate as Spot in the morning, but he needs to prove this without blowing his cover when Principal Stickler questions how he would know this. Spot gets French fleas on him and despite having a prejudice for fleas, he helps them find a new home. Song - "Can't We All Get Along?" Guest star: April Winchell as Clancy the lunch lady
39	26	"A Breed Apart"	Ennio Torresan Jr.	Jess Winfield	Fred Gonzales & Tina Kügler	May 10, 2002	1C03-N/A
Spot, concerned about how breed he felt, drags Leonard to a dog show to find out. In the meantime, Mr. Jolly's father pays a visit to the Helperman's and Mr. Jolly seems less than happy to see him. Song - "Scottish Bloudhound" Guest star: Ray Wise as Mr. Poppy Puttinpuss

== Broadcast and streaming ==
The show aired on ABC's One Saturday Morning block beginning on September 9, 2000. The block would continue airing new episodes of the show until February 9, 2002 and reruns would last there until September 7, 2002, when the block was rebranded to ABC Kids the following week.

The show began airing on Toon Disney on January 7, 2002 with new episodes premiering on the channel starting January 11, 2002. Toon Disney would continue airing new episodes of it each Friday until reaching its finale on May 10, 2002. By August 2006, it was removed from Toon Disney altogether and has not aired on US television since then.

The entire series was made available on Disney+ on launch day, November 12, 2019, in its original format. (Note: When the series originally aired on ABC and Toon Disney, it made use of the "Pan and Scan" method since widescreen televisions weren't readily available at the time)

== Awards ==
Year	Award	Category	Nominee	Result
2001	Daytime Emmy Award	Outstanding Performer In An Animated Program	Nathan Lane	Won
2001	British Academy Children's Awards	International	Teacher's Pet	Won
2001	Annie Award	Outstanding Achievement in a Daytime Animated Television Production	Teacher's Pet	Nominated
2001	Annie Award	Outstanding Individual Achievement for Production Design in an Animated Television Production	Gary Baseman	Nominated
2001	Annie Award	Outstanding Individual Achievement for Voice Acting by a Male Performer in an Animated Television Production	David Ogden Stiers	Nominated
2002	Daytime Emmy Award	Outstanding Special Class Animated Program	Gary Baseman, Bill Steinkellner, Cheri Steinkellner, Jess Winfield, Nancylee Myatt, Timothy Björklund, Don MacKinnon, Alfred Gimeno, Jamie Thomason, Julie Morgavi, David Maples and Billiam Coronel	Won
2002	Daytime Emmy Award	Outstanding Individual in Animation	Chuck Klein	Won
2003	Daytime Emmy Award	Outstanding Special Class Animated Program	Gary Baseman, Bill Steinkellner, Cheri Steinkellner, Jess Winfield, Don MacKinnon, Ennio Torresan Jr., Alfred Gimeno, Julie Morgavi, David Maples and Billiam Coronel	Won
2003	Daytime Emmy Award	Outstanding Individual in Animation	Gary Baseman	Won

== Film ==
A full-length animated feature based on the series, also titled Teacher's Pet, was released by Walt Disney Pictures on January 16, 2004. The film features the main cast from the series reprising their roles alongside new characters played by Kelsey Grammer, Megan Mullally, and Paul Reubens.

Serving as a finale to the series, the film follows the characters during summer vacation. Leonard hopes Spot will finally act like a normal dog, but Spot hopes to become a real boy with the help of a mad scientist who claims he can turn animals human. The film received mostly positive reviews from critics but was a failure at the box office, making little more than half of its budget back.
