= Cranium Whoonu =

Board game

- The cover of the game.
- Players: 3 to 6
- Setup time: < 5 minutes
- Playing time: 15-30 minutes
- Chance: Medium
- Age range: 7

Cranium Whoonu is a party game manufactured by Cranium, Inc. Whoonu is billed as "the fun-filled 'what's your favorite thing?' game".

== Equipment ==
- 300 cards labeled with random people, places, things, actions, etc.
- 36 tokens in six different values (1 to 6)
- Secret envelope

== Preparation ==
There are different combinations for the number of tokens needed depending on how many people are playing. If there are three participants, use tokens 1 to 4 in stacks of three. If there are four players, use tokens 1 to 6 in stacks of four, tokens 1 to 4 in stacks of five if there are five, and tokens 1 to 5 in stacks of six if there are six. Also, you must remember that there are many different species of cards. For this reason, it is important to make sure you pick the right ones.

The envelope is given to the player with the nearest upcoming birthday. This player is the first "Whoozit".

Everyone except the Whoozit receives four cards and the remaining cards are put face down in a pile. Players can look at their cards, but cannot show them to anyone else.

== Game play ==
In each round, players will try to guess the Whoozit's favorite things. For example, a player may have been dealt these cards: Super Bowl Sunday, New York City, string cheese and gardening. He would pick two cards (if there were three or four players) or one card (if there were five or six players) marked with things that he thinks the Whoozit prefers.

All of the players other than the Whoozit put their chosen cards in the envelope without revealing them. The Whoozit then takes the cards out of the envelope and secretly puts them behind the corresponding tokens: 1 for least favorite, and 6 for most favorite.

The Whoozit reveals the least favorite thing first, reading it aloud. The player who chose this card takes the 1 token and gets one point. The Whoozit continues turning over cards until all of them are revealed and one token from each stack is awarded.

After this process is completed, then a new Whoozit must be selected. Everyone passes their cards to the player on their left. The player with no cards takes the envelope and becomes the new Whoozit.

All of the revealed cards are put in a discard pile. Everyone except the Whoozit draws more cards for a total of four cards in each hand. The game continues until everyone has been the Whoozit and all of the tokens are awarded.

== Variations ==
Because of the relative randomness of all responses, it is not uncommon for players to come up with their categories for Whoonu rounds, such as "different flavors of soup" "unlikely super powers" or any listable (or even risque, vulgar, or abstract, such as using a potato) category that the players' imaginations can come up with. With such variable categories, it is not uncommon to continue beyond one round. Most games, in such cases, last until a predetermined point total (like 100 or 200) has been achieved by one player or until all 300 Whoonu cards have been played.

It is relatively easy to create a homemade version of the game by taking index cards, writing other nouns, names, and verbs on them, and using any other form of scoring tokens like coins or poker chips. Using other scoring tokens makes it possible to have more than the game's self-allotted maximum of 7 players.

A different way of playing Whoonu includes having the same judge (or Whoonu) for everybody's category for one round. While that judge would be absent from scoring for that round and would not be able to submit any of their cards for any of the categories in that round, all players would be absent from one round each, making it even.

A variation of that judging method is to have one judge deal out 6 cards to the other 6 players (or 5 or 4 players), but none to himself. (If there are only 3 other players, deal out 12 cards to each player; if 2 players, 18 cards each.) The judge will then make up 6 categories in a row to judge and the other players can only submit cards from the remaining cards in their hand; they are not allowed to draw another card from the deck. When it comes to the sixth category, the players have to submit what card/cards remain in their hand, no matter how relevant the card is to the category.

Another simple variation instead has the players choose the "Whoozit's" least favorite, as opposed to the normal way of playing when the players choose the Whoozit's favorite.
