= Shaun Fleming =

American musician and actor

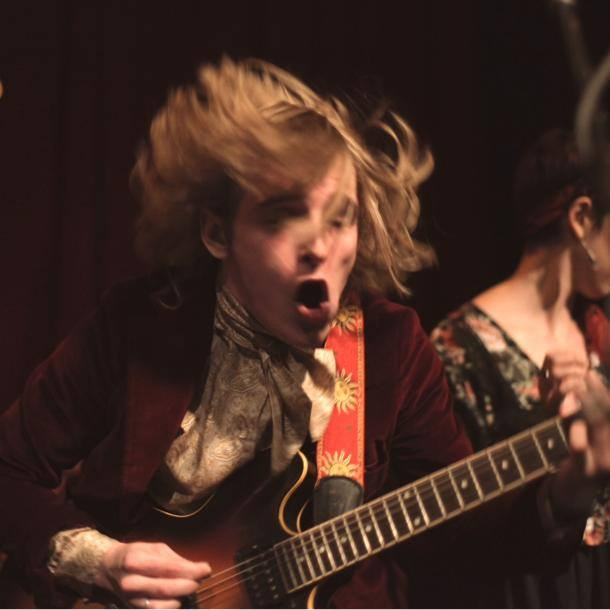
- Fleming performing in October 2013

Background information
- Born: Shaun Michael Fleming; May 31, 1987 (age 39); Westlake Village, California, U.S.
- Genres: Indie rock, glam rock
- Occupations: Musician, actor
- Instrument: Drums
- Years active: 1994–present

Shaun Michael Fleming (born May 31, 1987) is an American musician and actor. He is best known as the former live drummer of the indie rock band Foxygen and the creator of his solo project Diane Coffee as well as his Disney voice acting career.

== Acting career ==
Fleming began his career starring in the independent film Operation Splitsville (1999) which led to his first role for the Walt Disney Corporation as Max Goof in the film Mickey's Once Upon a Christmas.

Fleming continued his career primarily as a voice actor, appearing as a regular on Kim Possible between 2002 and 2006, where he played the twin brothers Jim and Tim Possible for the first three seasons, and Lilo & Stitch: The Series where he played Keoni Jameson. In 2003, Fleming landed his first full-length feature Jeepers Creepers 2, where he played the young farm boy, Billy, who was abducted in the opening scenes of the film. In 2004, Fleming would reprise his leading role as Leonard Amadeus Helperman for the animated feature Teacher's Pet. In 2008, Fleming played Jimmy Livingston in Bubble Boy: The Musical, a stage adaptation of the 2001 film Bubble Boy.

== Music career ==
Fleming, a childhood friend of the experiment rock duo Foxygen, joined the group as the live drummer, beginning with tours promoting the band's album We Are the 21st Century Ambassadors of Peace & Magic (2012). Fleming released a solo EP, entitled Thank You, in 2011.

=== Diane Coffee ===
In 2012, Fleming left Agoura Hills for New York and while still touring with Foxygen, began writing and recording what would become the debut Diane Coffee LP My Friend Fish. Though his means were limited (recording a makeshift drum set with his iPhone voice memo app, using detuned guitars in lieu of a bass), he was able to complete the album in just shy of two weeks. The album was released on October 29, 2013, via record label Western Vinyl.

The live band behind the 2013–2014 My Friend Fish tours usually consisted of Joey Lefitz on drums, Jared Walker on guitar, Emily Panic on bass, and Steve Okonski on Keys. One 2014 tour featured Spencer Klein on drums.

Diane Coffee was featured on the song "Crown" by Run the Jewels, which appears on their 2014 album Run the Jewels 2.

A follow-up album Everybody's a Good Dog LP was released in 2015.

In the spring of 2019 Fleming released Internet Arms on Polyvinyl and subsequently toured the U.S. His touring band for the summer of 2019 featured Sam Bryson on drums, Kyle Paul on guitar, Aidan Epstein on bass, and Matt Romy on keyboards.

Fleming is based in Bloomington, Indiana.

== Discography ==
=== Early works ===
- Thank You EP (2011)

=== With Diane Coffee ===
- My Friend Fish LP (2013)
- Run the Jewels 2 – "Crown" (feat. Diane Coffee) (2014)
- Everybody's a Good Dog LP (2015)
- Internet Arms LP (2019)
- "The Letdown" – single (2020)
- With People LP (2022)

== Filmography ==
=== Film ===
Year	Title	Role	Notes
1998	Operation Splitsville	Ernie	
1999	Mickey's Once Upon a Christmas	Max Goof (voice)	
2003	Jeepers Creepers 2	Billy Taggart	
2004	Teacher's Pet	Leonard Helperman (voice)	
2004	The Lion King 1½	The Lost Boys (voice)	Cameo

=== Television ===
Year	Title	Role	Notes
1994	Cyberkidz	Kyle Cooper	13 episodes
2000	Pepper Ann	Cookie (voice)	Episode: "A Valentine's Day Tune"
2000	Buzz Lightyear of Star Command	Boy (voice)	Episode: "Holiday Time"
2000–02	Teacher's Pet	Leonard Helperman (voice)	39 episodes
2001	The Legend of Tarzan	Young Tarzan (voice)	Episode: "Tarzan and the Face from the Past"
2002–06	Kim Possible	Tim Possible, Jim Possible (voice)	33 episodes
2002–04	Fillmore!	Various characters (voice)	8 episodes
2003–05	Lilo & Stitch: The Series	Keoni Jameson (voice)	5 episodes
2003	Kim Possible: A Sitch in Time	Tim Possible, Jim Possible (voice)	Television film
2005	Kim Possible Movie: So the Drama	Tim Possible, Jim Possible (voice)	Television film

=== Video games ===
Year	Title	Role	Notes
2000	Walt Disney World Quest: Magical Racing Tour	Ned Shredbetter, Baron Karlott, X.U.D. 71, Oliver Chickley III	
2000	The Lion King: Simba's Mighty Adventure	Young Simba	
2001	Monsters, Inc. Scream Team	Nerves	
2002	Kingdom Hearts	Tidus	
2007	Kingdom Hearts Re: Chain of Memories	Tidus	
2010	Kingdom Hearts Coded	Tidus	
2013	Kingdom Hearts HD 1.5 Remix	Tidus	
2014	Kingdom Hearts HD 2.5 Remix	Tidus	
