= Richard Tait (game designer) =

Scottish-born board game creator (died 2022)

Richard John Tait (January 17, 1964 – July 25, 2022) was a Scottish-born American board game creator known for developing Cranium with Whit Alexander, a fellow ex-Microsoft executive. They founded the game company Cranium, Inc. and led it until 2008, when it was acquired by Hasbro.

== Biography ==
Richard Tait was born in Broughty Ferry, Scotland on January 17, 1964 to his father Andrew, a Poloroid executive, and his mother Kathleen, a receptionist for a medical office. He grew up in Helensburgh, Scotland and considered himself an "idea guy" from a young age. His jobs included herding sheep. As a newspaper delivery boy, he offered bacon and rolls in addition to the morning paper. Tait aspired to be a drummer but was encouraged by his parents to pursue accounting, which he disliked after taking an accounting class. He later said, "I was very unhappy. There was nothing about it I could find fun or exciting." When his father gave him a synthesizer building kit, Tait was introduced to computer science, which he later studied at Heriot-Watt University in Edinburgh. He moved to the United States in 1986 for a master's degree from the Tuck School of Business at Dartmouth College.

After his graduation from Tuck School, Tait accepted a software development position at Microsoft, where he worked for 10 years. He developed multiple internal businesses such as MSN HomeAdvisor, was mentored by future Microsoft CEO Steve Ballmer, and hired the future Microsoft CEO Satya Nadella. Tait left Microsoft in 1997 and considered a career as a radio DJ.

In 1998, Tait co-created the board game Cranium with Whit Alexander, another former Microsoft executive. Inc magazine reported in 2002 that his resumé contained both "shepherd" and "Microsoft Employee of the Year". Tait and Alexander expanded the operation into Cranium, Inc., which developed many games before it was acquired by Hasbro for $77.5 million in 2008.

Tait launched Golazo, a now-defunct energy drink company. He became an "entrepreneur-in-residence" at Starbucks before joining Valor Siren Ventures, a venture capital fund in Seattle.

== Personal life ==
Tait was a lifelong fan of association football. He was married to Karen Fries, with whom he shared two sons and one daughter. The couple later divorced. Tait was engaged to Amy Paron at the time of his death.

Tait died from complications of COVID-19 at his home in Bainbridge Island, Washington, on July 25, 2022, at the age of 58.
