= Timothy Björklund =

American artist

Timothy Björklund, also known as Timothy Berglund, is an American artist, animator, story writer, art director, and director of animated film and television from the United States. A two-time Emmy Award winner for his work on the television series Teacher's Pet, his sole movie to date, the spin-off feature Teacher's Pet, was nominated for a Golden Satellite Award in 2005.

== Career ==
Björklund entered the professional animation industry in 1984 as an assistant animator for Colossal Pictures, before moving into directing four years later. His television career gained prominence in 1993 when he wrote and directed dozens of episodes of the Nickelodeon animated series Rocko's Modern Life.

In 2000, Björklund directed episodes of the Disney animated children's television series Teacher's Pet, which earned him two Emmy Awards in the Outstanding Animation category. He subsequently directed its 2004 spin-off movie. Between 2004 and 2006, he directed all 39 episodes of the Disney animated series Brandy & Mr. Whiskers, of which he was executive producer.

In 2011, he directed the Nick Jr. series Olivia at Brown Bag Films. The following year, in 2012, he was appointed Director of the Dublin-based studios of Kavaleer Productions.

== Personal life ==
Björklund was born in San Francisco, California, United States. He began drawing cartoons at a young age and decided to pursue a career in animation after seeing a Betty Boop cartoon when he was 16. He graduated from California Institute of the Arts with a Bachelor of Fine Arts in Film Graphics/Experimental Animation in 1982 and a Master of Fine Arts degree in 1984. He is of Icelandic heritage. As of 2012, Björklund divides his time between the United States and Ireland.

== Filmography ==
=== As director ===
- Nickelodeon's Rocko's Modern Life (TV series, 1993–96, as Timothy Berglund)
- The Twisted Tales of Felix the Cat (1995)
- Teacher's Pet (TV series, 2000–02)
- Brandy & Mr. Whiskers (TV series, 2004–06)
- Disney's Teacher's Pet (Feature film, 2004)
- Olivia (TV series, 2011)

=== Other ===
- Assistant animator for Colossal Pictures (1984)
- Animator for One Crazy Summer (1986)
- Animator for *batteries not included (1987)
- Animator for Cocoon: The Return (1988)
- Animator for Willow (1988)
- Animator for Who Framed Roger Rabbit (1988)
- Art director/layout artist for "Betty Boop's Hollywood Mystery" (1989)
- Visual effects for The Meteor Man (1993)
- Storyboard director and writer for Rocko's Modern Life (1993–96) (credited in the show as Timothy Berglund, referred to on Joe Murray's website as Timothy Björklund)
- Executive Producer, Writer, Director for The Twisted Tales of Felix the Cat (1996–97)
- Model/prop designer for Baby Blues (2000–02)
- Additional character designer for The SpongeBob SquarePants Movie (2004)
- Writer and storyboard work for Phineas and Ferb (2008)
- Storyboard work for Kung Fu Magoo (2010)
- Animated the Big Beast Quintet ID for Nickelodeon
