= David Ogden Stiers =

American actor and conductor (1942–2018)

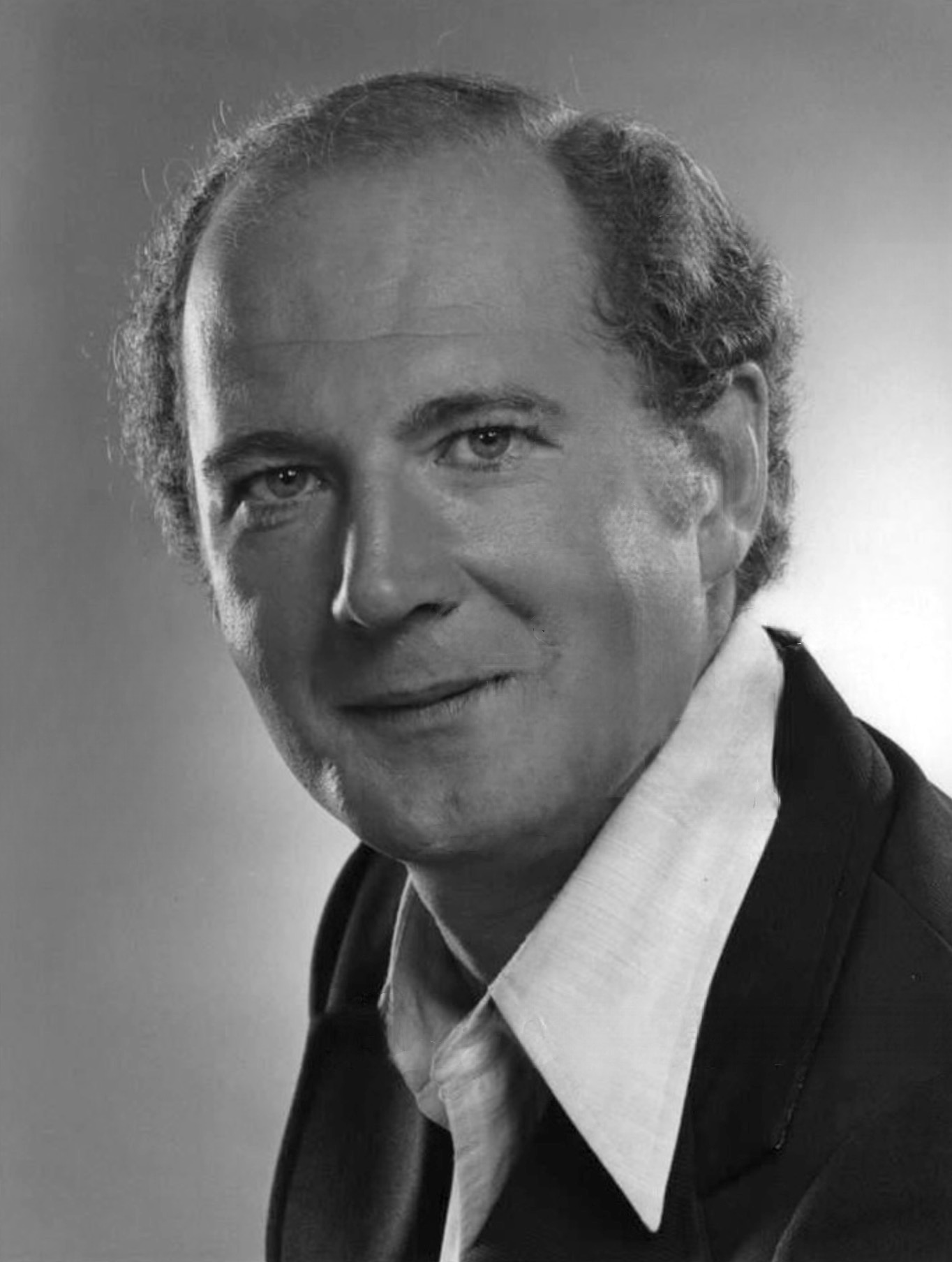
- Stiers in 1975
- Born: David Allen Ogden Stiers; October 31, 1942; Peoria, Illinois, U.S.
- Died: March 3, 2018 (aged 75); Newport, Oregon, U.S.
- Education: University of Oregon; Juilliard School (BFA)
- Occupations: Actor; conductor
- Years active: 1971–2017
- Known for: M*A*S*H; Perry Mason: The Case of the Notorious Nun; Perry Mason: The Case of the Lost Love; Beauty and the Beast; Lilo & Stitch; Pocahontas
- Awards: TV Land Impact Award (2009)

David Allen Ogden Stiers (/ˈstaɪ.ərz/ STY-ərz; October 31, 1942 – March 3, 2018) was an American actor and conductor. He appeared in numerous productions on Broadway, and originated the role of Feldman in The Magic Show, in 1974.

In 1977, Stiers was cast as Major Charles Emerson Winchester III, MD, on the television series M*A*S*H, a role he portrayed until the series' conclusion in 1983, and which earned him two Emmy Award nominations. He appeared prominently in the 1980s in the role of District Attorney Michael Reston in several Perry Mason television films, and voiced a number of Disney characters, including Cogsworth in 1991's Beauty and the Beast, Governor Ratcliffe and Wiggins in 1995's Pocahontas, and Dr. Jumba Jookiba in the Lilo & Stitch franchise. He also voiced Kamaji in the English-language version of Spirited Away (2001). He appeared in television again on the supernatural drama series The Dead Zone as Reverend Gene Purdy, a role he portrayed from 2002 to 2007.

He joined the cast of Stargate: Atlantis in its third season as Oberoth, leader of the human-form replicators.

Stiers continued to contribute voice work for films and television productions in his later years, narrating M. Night Shyamalan's Lady in the Water (2006) and having a recurring role on the Cartoon Network Studios series Regular Show. Stiers spent his later years as a conductor of the Newport Symphony Orchestra.

== Early life ==
David Allen Ogden Stiers was born at St. Francis Hospital in Peoria, Illinois, on October 31, 1942, the son of Margaret Elizabeth (née Ogden) and Kenneth Truman Stiers, and grew up in Peoria Heights, Chillicothe, and Urbana, Illinois. His family moved to Eugene, Oregon, where he graduated from North Eugene High School, and briefly attended the University of Oregon.

Stiers subsequently moved to San Francisco, where he performed with the California Shakespeare Theater, San Francisco Actors Workshop, and the improvisation group The Committee, whose members included Rob Reiner, Howard Hesseman, and Peter Bonerz. While in California, he worked for the Santa Clara Shakespeare Festival for seven years. While he was performing in California, Stiers was spotted by John Houseman, who invited Stiers to move to New York City to study at the Juilliard School (Drama Division Group 1: 1968–1972).

After graduating in 1972, Stiers helped found the City Center Acting Company. He appeared in many Acting Company productions, including The Three Sisters and The Beggar's Opera.

== Career ==
=== Early acting credits ===
Stiers first appeared in the Broadway production The Magic Show in 1974 in the role of Feldman. Subsequent early credits included roles on the television series The Mary Tyler Moore Show, Kojak, and Rhoda. Stiers also appeared in the pilot of Charlie's Angels as the team's chief backup. He also appeared as a teacher in the 1977 television film A Circle of Children, about a school for special-needs children.

=== M*A*S*H (1977–1983) ===
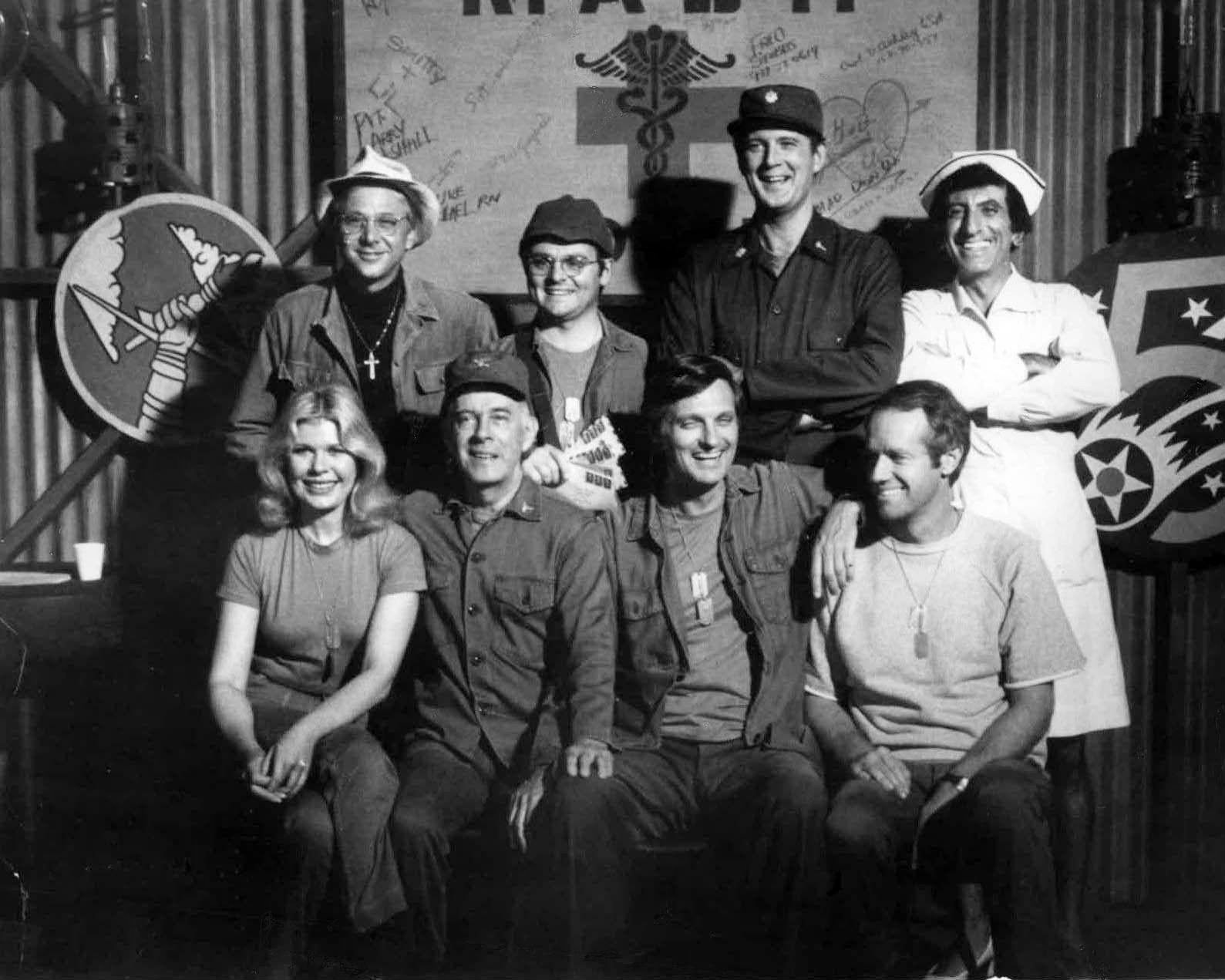
Cast photo from M*A*S*H for 1977: Front row from left – Loretta Swit, Harry Morgan, Alan Alda, Mike Farrell. Back row from left – William Christopher, Gary Burghoff, David Ogden Stiers, and Jamie Farr

In 1977, Stiers joined the cast of the CBS sitcom M*A*S*H. As Major Charles Emerson Winchester III, MD, Stiers filled the void created by the departure of actor Larry Linville's Frank Burns character. In contrast to the buffoonish Burns, Winchester was articulate, socially sophisticated, and a highly talented surgeon; he presented a different type of foil to Alan Alda's Hawkeye Pierce and Mike Farrell's B.J. Hunnicutt. Burns usually served as the butt of practical jokes by Pierce or Hunnicutt, was frequently inundated with insults for which he had no comebacks, and was often harshly criticized for his surgical skills. Winchester, however, presented a challenge to his colleagues' displays of irreverence, since his surgical skills could match or even outshine their own, and when it came to pranks and insults, he frequently outmaneuvered his opponent; his patrician manner and aversion to puerile behavior served as the target for his fellow surgeons' barbs and jokes. At times, however, Winchester could align himself with Pierce and Hunnicutt, and the occasional tantrum aside, held considerable admiration for his commanding officer, Harry Morgan's Colonel Sherman T. Potter. For his portrayal of the pompous but emotionally complex Boston aristocrat, Stiers received two Emmy Award nominations.

=== Other television work ===
After M*A*S*H completed its run in 1983, Stiers made guest appearances on the television shows North and South; Star Trek: The Next Generation; Murder, She Wrote; Matlock; Touched by an Angel; Wings; ALF and Frasier, along with a regular role in the first season of Two Guys, a Girl and a Pizza Place as Mr. Bauer. In 1984, he portrayed United States Olympic Committee founder William Milligan Sloane in the NBC miniseries The First Olympics: Athens 1896 for which he received another Emmy nomination. Beginning in 1985, Stiers made his first of eight appearances in Perry Mason television film as District Attorney Michael Reston. He appeared in two unsuccessful television projects, Love & Money and Justice League of America (as Martian Manhunter). He also played Uncle Teddy Quinn (brother of Dr. Mike's father), a world-renowned concert pianist, in Dr. Quinn Medicine Woman. In 2002, Stiers started a recurring role as the Reverend Purdy on the successful USA Network series The Dead Zone with Anthony Michael Hall. In 2006, he was cast as the recurring character Oberoth in Stargate Atlantis.

=== Voice acting ===
Stiers provided voice work for dozens of film and television projects. His first work was on one of George Lucas's earliest films, the critically acclaimed THX 1138, in which he was incorrectly billed as "David Ogden Steers". Stiers voiced PBS documentary films such as Ric Burns's project New York: A Documentary Film, 2010 Peabody Award winner The Lord Is Not on Trial Here Today, and several episodes of the documentary television series American Experience, including Ansel Adams (2002), also directed by Ric Burns. He voiced Mr. Piccolo in the animated English-dubbed version of Studio Ghibli's 1992 film Porco Rosso, as well as Kamaji in the English dub of the studio's 2001 film Spirited Away. He collaborated with Disney on eight animated features, including 1991's Beauty and the Beast (as Cogsworth, also providing the opening narration), 1995's Pocahontas (as Governor Ratcliffe and Wiggins), 1996's The Hunchback of Notre Dame (as the Archdeacon), 2001's Atlantis: The Lost Empire (as Mr. Harcourt), and 2002's Lilo & Stitch (as Jumba Jookiba). He reprised a number of his Disney roles for various sequels, most notably with Jumba in Lilo & Stitch's three sequel films (2003's Stitch! The Movie, 2005's Lilo & Stitch 2: Stitch Has a Glitch, and 2006's Leroy & Stitch) and Lilo & Stitch: The Series.

He lent his voice to the direct-to-video Batman: Mystery of the Batwoman (2003) as the Penguin. Stiers did voice work for Solovar in a two-part episode, "The Brave and The Bold" of Justice League and voiced Solovar again in a Justice League Unlimited episode "Dead Reckoning". He voiced Mr. Jolly from Teacher's Pet. He voiced the king and prime minister in the 2004 short film The Cat That Looked at a King. In Hoodwinked (2005), Stiers voiced the role of Nicky Flippers, the frog detective who is dispatched to Granny's house. He voiced Pops's father, Mr. Maellard, in the animated TV series Regular Show, which debuted in 2010. Stiers had voices in several video games, including Icewind Dale, Kingdom Hearts II, Kingdom Hearts: Birth by Sleep, as Jeff Zandi in Uru: Ages Beyond Myst, and as Esher in Myst V: End of Ages.

Stiers was the reader for numerous audiobook versions of novels, including Tom Wolfe's A Man in Full (1998), and Colleen McCullough's The First Man in Rome.

=== Music ===
Though he had no formal musical training, Stiers was the associate conductor of the Newport (Oregon) Symphony Orchestra and the Ernest Bloch Music Festival; he also played a major role in establishing the orchestra. He guest-conducted over 70 orchestras around the world, including the Oregon Mozart Players, the Vancouver Symphony Orchestra, the Virginia Symphony Orchestra, the Oregon Chamber Players, and the Yaquina (Oregon) Chamber Orchestra, as well as orchestras in San Francisco, San Diego, Los Angeles, Chicago, Salt Lake City, and Toronto.

Stiers traced his love of music to a performance by George Szell and the Cleveland Orchestra on the basketball court at the University of Oregon in the 1950s. During his days at Juilliard, he would skip his acting classes to sit in on master classes led by such notables as John Williams, Pierre Boulez, and Sir Georg Solti.

Stiers also performed as Reverend Brock in the 2000 New York City Center's Encores! series presentation of Tenderloin.

== Death ==
Stiers died at his home in Newport, Oregon, on March 3, 2018, at the age of 75, from complications related to bladder cancer.

== Filmography ==
=== Film ===
Year	Title	Role	Notes
1971	THX 1138	Announcer	Voice, credited as David Ogden Steers
1971	Drive, He Said	Pro Owner	
1977	Oh, God!	Mr. McCarthy, District Produce Manager	
1977	A Circle of Children	Dan Franklin	Television film
1978	The Cheap Detective	Captain	
1978	Magic	Todson	
1979	Breaking Up Is Hard to Do	Howard Freed	Television film
1981	Harry's War	Ernie	
1985	The Bad Seed	Emory Breedlove	Television film
1985	The Man with One Red Shoe	The Conductor	
1985	Better Off Dead...	Al Meyer	
1985	Creator	Dr. Sid Kullenbeck	
1986	Mrs. Delafield Wants to Marry	Horton Delafield	Television film
1987	The Alamo: 13 Days to Glory	Colonel Black	Television film
1987	J. Edgar Hoover	Franklin D. Roosevelt	Television film
1987	Perry Mason: The Case of the Lost Love	D.A. Michael Reston	Television film
1987	Perry Mason: The Case of the Murdered Madam	D.A. Michael Reston	Television film
1987	Perry Mason: The Case of the Notorious Nun	D.A. Michael Reston	Television film
1987	Perry Mason: The Case of the Scandalous Scoundrel	D.A. Michael Reston	Television film
1987	Perry Mason: The Case of the Shooting Star	D.A. Michael Reston	Television film
1987	Perry Mason: The Case of the Sinister Spirit	D.A. Michael Reston	Television film
1988	Another Woman	Young Marion's Father	
1988	The Accidental Tourist	Porter Leary	
1988	Perry Mason: The Case of the Avenging Ace	D.A. Michael Reston	Television film
1988	Perry Mason: The Case of the Lady in the Lake	D.A. Michael Reston	Television film
1989	Day One	Franklin D. Roosevelt	Television film
1989	The Final Days	Alexander Haig	Television film
1990	The Kissing Place	Charles Tulane	Television film
1991	Doc Hollywood	Mayor Nick Nicholson	
1991	Beauty and the Beast	Cogsworth and narrator	Voice
1991	Wife, Mother, Murderer	John Homan	Television film
1991	Shadows and Fog	Hacker	
1992	The Last of His Tribe	Dr. Saxton Pope	
1992	Porco Rosso	Grandpa Piccolo	Voice, English dub
1993	Taking Liberty	Benjamin Franklin	
1993	Without a Kiss Goodbye	Gerald Orr	Television film
1994	Iron Will	J.W. Harper	
1994	Past Tense	Dr. Bert James	Television film
1995	Bad Company	Judge Beach	
1995	Napoleon	Koala, Owl	Voice
1995	Pocahontas	Governor Ratcliffe and Wiggins	Voice
1995	Mighty Aphrodite	Laius	
1995	Steal Big Steal Little	Judge Winton Myers	
1996	The Hunchback of Notre Dame	Archdeacon	Voice
1996	Everyone Says I Love You	Holden's Father	
1996	To Face Her Past	Ken Bradfield	Television film
1997	Beauty and the Beast: The Enchanted Christmas	Cogsworth	Voice, direct-to-video
1997	Justice League of America	J'onn J'onzz / Martian Manhunter	Television film
1997	Meet Wally Sparks	Governor Floyd Preston	
1997	Jungle 2 Jungle	Alexei Jovanovic	
1998	Belle's Magical World	Cogsworth	Voice, direct-to-video
1998	Krippendorf's Tribe	Henry Spivey	
1998	Pocahontas II: Journey to a New World	Governor Ratcliffe, Duke of Buckingham	Voice, direct-to-video
1999	My Neighbors the Yamadas	The Narrator	Voice, English dub
1999	The Stand-In	Professor Smith	
2001	Tomcats	Dr. Crawford	
2001	Atlantis: The Lost Empire	Mr. Fenton Q. Harcourt	Voice
2001	Spirited Away	Kamaji	Voice, English dub
2001	The Curse of the Jade Scorpion	Voltan	
2001	The Majestic	Doc Stanton	
2001	Mickey's Magical Christmas: Snowed in at the House of Mouse	Cogsworth	Voice, direct-to-video
2001	Murder, She Wrote: The Last Free Man	Stanford Thornton	Television film
2002	Lilo & Stitch	Dr. Jumba Jookiba	Voice
2003	Batman: Mystery of the Batwoman	Penguin	Voice, direct-to-video
2003	Stitch! The Movie	Dr. Jumba Jookiba	Voice, direct-to-video
2004	Cable Beach	Doc McWhirter	Television film
2004	The Cat That Looked at a King	The King, The Prime Minister	Voice, short film
2004	Winnie the Pooh: Springtime with Roo	The Narrator	Voice, direct-to-video
2004	Teacher's Pet	Mr. Jolly	Voice
2005	Hoodwinked!	Nicky Flippers	Voice
2005	Lilo & Stitch 2: Stitch Has a Glitch	Dr. Jumba Jookiba	Voice, direct-to-video
2005	The Origin of Stitch	Dr. Jumba Jookiba	Voice, short, uncredited
2005	Pooh's Heffalump Halloween Movie	The Narrator	Voice, direct-to-video
2006	Lady in the Water	The Narrator	Voice, uncredited
2006	Leroy & Stitch	Dr. Jumba Jookiba	Voice, direct-to-video
2008	Together Again for the First Time	Max Frobisher	Television film
2009	Not Dead Yet	William Weinshawler	
2011	Hoodwinked Too! Hood vs. Evil	Nicky Flippers	Voice, final animated voice acting role before his death in 2018
2017	Neil Stryker and the Tyrant of Time	The Admiral	
2017	The Joneses Unplugged	Ralph Wilson	Television film, final film role

=== Television ===
Year	Title	Role	Notes
1975	Kojak	Bryan LeBlanc, Mr. Roberts	Episode: "Money Back Guarantee"
1976	Charlie's Angels	Scott Woodville	Episode: "Charlie's Angels" (Pilot)
1976	Doc	Stanley Moss	7 episodes
1976–1977	The Mary Tyler Moore Show	Mel Price	3 episodes
1976	Phyllis	Mr. Raymond	Episode: "The Wrong Box"
1976–1977	Rhoda	Dr. Curt Dreiser, George	2 episodes
1977	This Is the Life	Harry	Episode: "Undertow"
1977	The Tony Randall Show	Cleaver	Episode: "Case: The People Speak"
1977–1983	M*A*S*H	Major Charles Emerson Winchester III	131 episodes
1978	The Paper Chase	Woodrow Tullis	Episode: "An Act of Desperation"
1979	$weepstake$	Wally	Episode: "Billy, Wally and Ludmilla, and Theodore"
1981	CBS Afternoon Playhouse	Peter Stenner	Episode: "Me and Mr. Stenner"
1983	American Playhouse	Doc	Episode: "The Innocents Abroad"
1984	The First Olympics: Athens 1896	William Milligan Sloane	Miniseries
1985	North and South	Congressman Sam Greene	Miniseries; 6 episodes
1986–1996	Murder, She Wrote	Howard Deems, Sergei Nemiroff, Aubrey Thornton	3 episodes
1986	North and South, Book II	Congressman Sam Greene	Miniseries; 6 episodes
1987–1988	Matlock	Thomas Baldwin, Arthur Hampton	3 episodes
1988	ALF	Flakey Pete	2 episodes
1989	The Ray Bradbury Theater	Leonard Mead	Episode: "The Pedestrian"
1990	CBS Schoolbreak Special	Jack Henderson	Episode: "American Eyes"
1990	Married People	Dr. Cashin	Episode: "Term Paper"
1990	Wings	Edward Tinsdale	Episode: "A Little Nightmare Music"
1991	Star Trek: The Next Generation	Timicin	Episode: "Half a Life"
1993	Jack's Place	Flower Man	Episode: "Forever and Ever"
1994	The Boys Are Back	George Spivack	Episode: "A Tree Dies in Portland"
1995–2011	American Experience	Narrator	Voice, 32 episodes
1996	Cybill	Val	Episode: "Educating Zoey"
1996	Poltergeist: The Legacy	Randolph Hitchcock	Episode: "The Twelfth Cave"
1997	Dr. Quinn, Medicine Woman	Theodore Quinn	Episode: "Farewell Appearance"
1998	101 Dalmatians: The Series	VLAD	Voice, episode: "Out to Launch/Prophet and Loss"
1998	Ally McBeal	Judge Andrew Peters	Episode: "They Eat Horses, Don't They?"
1998	Two Guys, a Girl and a Pizza Place	Mr. Bauer	13 episodes
1999	The Angry Beavers	Byron Beaver	Voice, episode: "Kreature Komforts/Oh, Brother?"
1999	The Practice	Judge Hollings	Episode: "Infected"
1999	The Outer Limits	Reverend Dr. Thomas Tilford	Episode: "The Shroud"
1999–2000	Love & Money	Nicholas Conklin	13 episodes
2000	The Wild Thornberrys	Karroo	Voice, episode: "Luck Be an Aye-Aye"
2000	Bull	Gardner Blackstone	4 episodes
2000	The Trouble With Normal	Mr. Harrington	Episode: "Say Cheese"
2000–2002	Teacher's Pet	Mr. Jolly, narrator, Congressman	Voice, 39 episodes
2001–2002	House of Mouse	Cogsworth	Voice, 3 episodes
2002	Arli$	Eli	Episode: "It's All in the Game"
2002	Justice League	Solovar	Voice, episode: "The Brave and the Bold"
2002–2007	The Dead Zone	Reverend Eugene 'Gene' Purdy	40 episodes
2003	Frasier	Dr. Leland Barton	Episode: "Fathers and Sons"
2003	Touched by an Angel	Jones	2 episodes
2003–2006	Lilo & Stitch: The Series	Dr. Jumba Jookiba	Voice, main role
2004	Static Shock	Dr. Odium	Voice, episode: "Hoop Squad"
2005	American Dragon: Jake Long	Narrator, Crew Man	Voice, episode: "The Talented Mr. Long"
2005	Nova	Narrator	Episode: "A Daring Flight"
2006–2007	Stargate Atlantis	Oberoth	3 episodes
2006	Justice League Unlimited	Solovar	Voice, episode: "Dead Reckoning"
2006	Worst Week of My Life	Jenson	Episode: "Pilot"
2007	The Power of Choice: The Life and Ideas of Milton Friedman	Narrator	Documentary miniseries
2011	Leverage	Walt Whitman Wellesley IV	Episode: "The Lonely Hearts Job"
2011–2016	Regular Show	Mr. Maellard	Voice, 18 episodes
2015	Rizzoli & Isles	Dr. Isles	Episode: "Nice to Meet You, Dr. Isles"

=== Video games ===
Year	Title	Role	Notes
1996	Toonstruck	King Hugh	
2000	Icewind Dale	Narrator	
2002	Disney's Stitch: Experiment 626	Dr. Jumba Jookiba	
2002	Lilo & Stitch: Trouble in Paradise	Dr. Jumba Jookiba	
2002	Lilo & Stitch: Hawaiian Adventure	Dr. Jumba Jookiba	
2003	Uru: Ages Beyond Myst	Jeff Zandi	
2004	Uru: To D'ni	Dr. Richard Watson	
2005	Winnie the Pooh's Rumbly Tumbly Adventure	Narrator	
2005	Myst V: End of Ages	Esher	
2005	Kingdom Hearts II	Cogsworth	
2007	Kingdom Hearts II: Final Mix	Cogsworth	
2010	Kingdom Hearts Birth by Sleep	Dr. Jumba Jookiba; Doc	
2016	Baldur's Gate: Siege of Dragonspear	Belhifet/Grand Duke Eltan	

=== Theme parks ===
Year	Title	Role	Notes
1998	Fantasmic!	Governor Ratcliffe	Voice

== Broadway stage credits ==
Date(s)	Title	Role	Notes	Ref.
December 19, 1973 – January 11, 1974	Three Sisters	Kulygin		
December 22, 1973 – December 31, 1973	The Beggar's Opera	Peachum		
December 26, 1973 – January 5, 1974	Measure for Measure	The Duke		
December 28, 1973	Scapin	Geronte		
January 2, 1974 – January 6, 1974	Next Time I'll Sing to You	Hermit	understudy	
March 10, 1974 – May 11, 1974	Ulysses in Nighttown	Buck Mulligan, 2nd Watch, Bishop of Erin, Dr. Mulligan		
May 28, 1974 – December 31, 1978	The Magic Show	Feldman		
April 18, 1994 – July 29, 2007	Beauty and the Beast	Prologue Narrator		
November 22, 2009 – January 3, 2010	Irving Berlin's White Christmas	General Henry Waverly		

== Awards and nominations ==
Year	Award	Category	Film/TV show	Result
1981	Emmy Award	Outstanding Supporting Actor in a Comedy or Variety or Music Series	M*A*S*H	Nominated
1982	Emmy Award	Outstanding Supporting Actor in a Comedy or Variety or Music Series	M*A*S*H	Nominated
1984	Emmy Award	Outstanding Supporting Actor in a Limited Series or a Special	The First Olympics: Athens 1896	Nominated
2001	Annie Award	Outstanding Individual Achievement Voice Acting by a Male Performer in an Animated Television Production	Teacher's Pet	Nominated
2009	TV Land Award	Best Cast	M*A*S*H	Won
