= Cranium (board game) =

Party board game

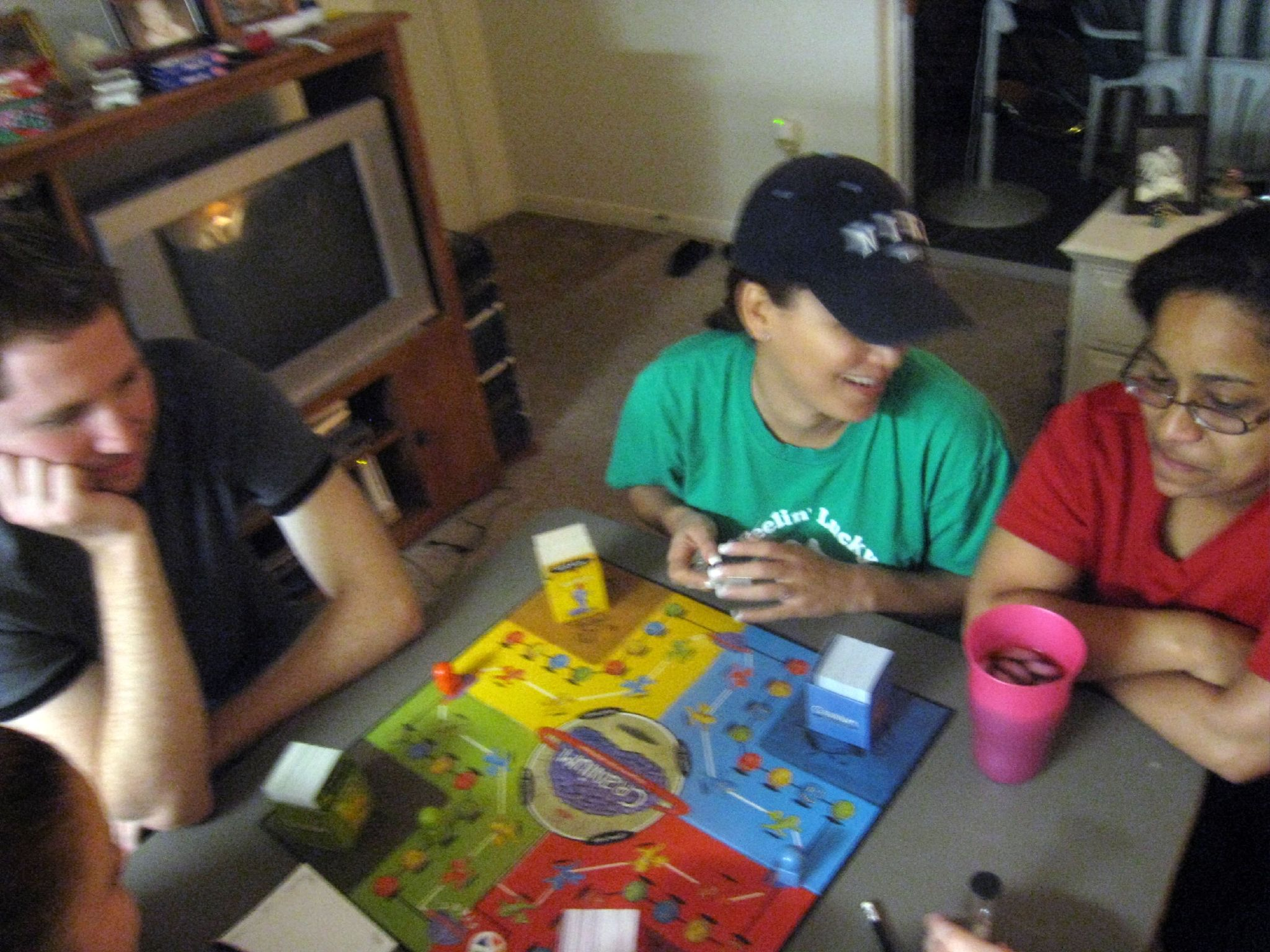
- Designers: Whit Alexander, Richard Tait
- Illustrators: Gary Baseman
- Publishers: Hasbro
- Publication: 1998; 28 years ago
- Players: 4+
- Setup time: approx. 2 minutes
- Playing time: > 35 minutes
- Chance: Medium
- Age range: 16+
- Skills: Creativity, general knowledge

Cranium is a party game created by Whit Alexander and Richard Tait in 1998. Initially, Cranium was sold through Amazon.com and the Starbucks coffee chain, then-novel methods of distribution. After selling 44 million copies of Cranium and its sister titles, the game's manufacturer Cranium, Inc. was bought by Hasbro, Inc. for $77.5 million in 2008. Billed as "The Game for Your Whole Brain", Cranium includes a wide variety of activities, unlike many other party games. Murray Brand Communications and brand strategist, Sonali Shah handled packaging and branding for the game, and the artwork is by cartoonist Gary Baseman.

== Gameplay ==
To play Cranium, players form teams and start on the beginning spot of a long track that goes around the game board. At the start of a team's turn, the team to their right selects a card and reads the task to them. If the task is completed successfully, the team rolls a colored die, and moves to the next spot that matches the color rolled.

There are four equally dispersed colors of spaces along the track. Each color corresponds to a question card category that players must pull from on their turn. Red cards are "Data Head" tasks, where the team needs to answer questions. Yellow cards are "Word Worm", where the team has to solve word problems, spell words, or solve anagrams. Blue cards are "Creative Cat" cards that require one player on the team to draw or use purple clay to sculpt answers that the other player must guess. Green cards are "Star Performer" cards, which requires one player to use charades, acting, or whistling so the rest of the team can guess the answer.

Along the track are four "Planet Cranium" spots, marked as purple. Teams have to stop on these spots, even if their roll would take them further. On their next turn, they select a category of their choosing to complete a task. If they are successful on their first attempt of a "Planet Cranium" task, they move to a "fast track", which has fewer spaces to traverse. If they are unsuccessful, they continue on the "scenic route", which will take longer.

Some cards in the "Creative Cat" and "Star Performer" decks are marked with "Club Cranium" symbols. If one of these cards is drawn, every team has to attempt the activity, and the winning team gets a bonus move.

Once a team reaches the center of the board, they are in "Cranium Central." The teams have to go around a circular section and collect one card from each category. Once that is accomplished, they are allowed into the final spot. At this point, on their turn the opposing teams choose a category for the team to complete. Completing the task wins the game, otherwise they have to try again on their next turn.

== Expansions and spinoffs ==
- Booster Boxes: boxes of cards (and clay) sold separately from the game that contain a new deck of each type of card. As of 2007, Booster Boxes 1 and 2 are available, along with a special New York edition pack.
- Cadoo: a children's version of the game that has some elements of tic-tac-toe. Sold between October 2007 and January 2008, Cadoo units were recalled in January 2008 by the U.S. Consumer Product Safety Commission because "the surface paint on the die contains excessive levels of lead, violating the federal lead paint standard."
- Conga: a version with a slightly older target audience than Cadoo. Incorporates a musical timer of Cranium, designed for three or more players to play cooperatively.
- Cranium Hoopla: A timed version of Cranium, designed for two or more players to play cooperatively.
- Cranium Hullabaloo: a children's dancing game
- Cranium Kabookii: a video game version available on the Wii platform. Activities comprise a mixture of some from the original game and new games better suited for a video game environment.
- Cranium Scribblish: played very much like the game of telephone. Players start by drawing a caption card from the deck and must draw the caption, then pass to another player who captions what they believe the other person has drawn, then draw said caption. Winners correctly guess which drawing started as their own.
- Cranium The Family Fun Game: a game similar to the original Cranium with some minor changes.
- Cranium Turbo Edition: a version of Cranium designed for a faster game.
- Cranium Wow: a similar game to the original with new cards and activities from Cranium Turbo.
- Cranium Pop 5: a pop-culture focused version released in 2006 where one team assigns the point value (ranked from 1–5) the other team will earn depending on how the other team guesses the clue (through acting, drawing, humming, sculpting, or using letter cubes).
- Cranium Brain Breaks: 200 one-minute mini games.
- Cranium SpongeBob SquarePants Edition
- Cranium Partyland Park: Is a children's game by Vtech, and Vsmile
- Jam Pack Jam: a travel-themed twist on Buckaroo
- Cariboo: a children's game
- Balloon Lagoon: a children's game
- Bloom Bingo
- Cranium Zigity
- Cranium Dark

== Reviews ==
- Family Games: The 100 Best
