= Lilo & Scratch =

2026 animated short film

- Theatrical release poster
- Directed by: Fawn Veerasunthorn; Malcon Pierce
- Written by: Fawn Veerasunthorn; Malcon Pierce
- Produced by: Nathan Curtis
- Starring: Chris Sanders; Maia Kealoha
- Music by: Haim Mazar; Grace Fisher
- Production company: Walt Disney Animation Studios
- Distributed by: Walt Disney Studios Motion Pictures (Note: Distributed by Walt Disney Studios Motion Pictures through the Walt Disney Pictures banner.)
- Release dates: November 12, 2026 (El Capitan Theatre with Hexed); November 25, 2026 (United States with Hexed)
- Running time: 6 minutes
- Country: United States
- Language: English

Lilo & Scratch is a 2026 American animated science fiction comedy short film produced by Walt Disney Animation Studios and written and directed by Fawn Veerasunthorn and Malcon Pierce. Set shortly after the events of Lilo & Stitch (2002), the short film follows Stitch (Chris Sanders) as he battles with Scratch (Veerasunthorn), an alien who Lilo (Maia Kealoha) adopts that looks like a cat. It is the first work in the Lilo & Stitch franchise produced under Walt Disney Animation Studios since the original film.

The short film is theatrically attached to Hexed, also co-directed by Veerasunthorn. Both films premiered on November 12, 2026, and are scheduled to be released on November 25, 2026.

== Plot ==
Set shortly after the events of the 2002 film, the short film follows Stitch as he battles with Scratch, an alien that looks like a cat who Lilo adopts.

== Voice cast ==
- Chris Sanders as Stitch, a blue koala-like alien also known as Experiment 626.
- Maia Kealoha as Lilo Pelekai, a Native Hawaiian girl who is Stitch's best friend and owner. Kealoha reprises her role from the 2025 live-action film.
- Fawn Veerasunthorn as Scratch, a cat-like alien.

Co-writer and co-director Malcon Pierce cameos as a truck driver who gets hijacked by Scratch; his appearance is modeled after Pierce.

== Production ==
During the Annecy International Animation Film Festival on June 26, 2026, it was reported that a new Lilo & Stitch animated short film, Lilo & Scratch, would be attached to screenings of Disney's upcoming animated film Hexed. The film marks the first theatrical short from Walt Disney Animation Studios in five years and is a direct follow up to the original Lilo & Stitch (2002). Hexed director Fawn Veerasunthorn helmed the short film alongside Malcon Pierce. Director of the original film and voice of Stitch, Chris Sanders returned to reprise his role. Maia Kealoha took on the role of Lilo after portraying her in the 2025 live-action film.

Jared Bush, the studio's chief creative officer decided that the studio should work on a comedy-focused short film project featuring Stitch. He enlisted Veerasunthorn and Pierce to work on ideas for the project with about 18 different ideas, one of the ideas featured a cat so when the directors pitched Bush the two ideas they presented he picked the idea with the cat. For the short film, Walt Disney Animation Studios developed a new animation pipeline that combined hand-drawn traditionally animated characters with computer-animated models seamlessly. Veerasunthorn's goal was for the film to look as close to the original 2002 film as possible while creating a workflow that allowed for artists to use a variety of tools and mediums at their disposal. Alex Kupershmidt, who was the supervising animator of Stitch on the original film, returned to animate on the short by hand, on paper, and served as character animation lead on the short. He pushed for the team to push the visuals and make them more cartoony. All instances of computer-animation in the film were designed to appear as close to 2D as the artists could make them. For example, in a scene where Stitch, who is a computer-animated model, and Scratch, who is hand-drawn animated, are interacting both were made to look indistinguishable from one another. The backgrounds in the short film were painted both traditionally and digitally depending on the artists choice of medium. Veerasunthorn directed the short from the Burbank studio while Pierce directed from the Vancouver studio.

In August 2026, Haim Mazar, who previously composed Versa with director Pierce, was revealed to be composing for the short film. Grace Fisher, a disabled artist and composer with acute flaccid myelitis, also composed the short film. The score is performed by a 70-piece symphony orchestra with a nine-piece Hawaiian ensemble, conducted by Mazar, with a new original theme from both composers tailored to work with either the orchestra or the Hawaiian ensemble.

The short film is dedicated to Daveigh Chase, the original voice of Lilo for the 2002 film and most sequels and spin-offs from 2002 to 2006.

== Marketing ==
A frame from the short, showing Lilo holding Scratch, was released as a first look on November 10, 2026. Another frame, showing Stitch holding Scratch as the latter reaches for Pudge in a water-filled coffee pot, was released on November 13. On November 17, Disney released a preview clip of the short on the Walt Disney Animation Studios and Disney Instagram accounts.

A children's book adaptation written by author John Edwards will be released in the future.

== Release ==
Footage from Lilo & Scratch was screened at the Annecy International Animation Film Festival on June 26, 2026, also known as "626 Day" or "Stitch Day" in reference to Stitch's codename, with the short's first two minutes shown. It is scheduled to be theatrically released alongside Hexed on November 25.

== Reception ==
=== Awards and nominations ===
Year	Award	Category	Nominee(s)	Result	Ref.
2026	Hollywood Music in Media Awards	Best Original Score – Short Film (Animated)	Haim Mazar and Grace Fisher	Nominated	
