= Agudong =

Agudong is a surname. Notable people with the surname include:

- Siena Agudong (born 2004), American actress
- Sydney Agudong (born 2000), American actress and singer
