= Lilo & Stitch =

2002 Disney animated film

- Theatrical release poster
- Directed by: Chris Sanders; Dean DeBlois
- Written by: Chris Sanders; Dean DeBlois
- Produced by: Clark Spencer
- Starring: Daveigh Chase; Chris Sanders (Note: Sanders is credited as Christopher Michael Sanders (his full name) for his voice role as Stitch.); Tia Carrere; Ving Rhames; David Ogden Stiers; Kevin McDonald; Jason Scott Lee; Zoe Caldwell; Kevin Michael Richardson
- Edited by: Darren T. Holmes
- Music by: Alan Silvestri
- Production companies: Walt Disney Feature Animation; Walt Disney Feature Animation Florida
- Distributed by: Buena Vista Pictures Distribution (Note: Distributed under the Walt Disney Pictures banner.)
- Release dates: June 16, 2002 (El Capitan Theatre); June 21, 2002 (United States)
- Running time: 85 minutes
- Country: United States
- Language: English
- Budget: $80 million
- Box office: $273.1 million

Lilo & Stitch (Note: /ˈliːloʊ/ LEE-loh) is a 2002 American animated science fiction comedy-drama film written and directed by Chris Sanders and Dean DeBlois, based on an original story created by Sanders. It was produced by Walt Disney Feature Animation, and stars Daveigh Chase and Sanders as the voices of the title characters, alongside Tia Carrere, David Ogden Stiers, Kevin McDonald, Ving Rhames, Jason Scott Lee, Zoe Caldwell, and Kevin Michael Richardson in supporting roles. It was the second installment in three Walt Disney Animation Studios animated feature films produced primarily at the Florida animation studio in Disney-MGM Studios at Walt Disney World near Orlando, Florida. (Note: The first being Mulan (1998) and the third being Brother Bear (2003).)

The film follows two individuals: an orphaned Hawaiian girl, Lilo Pelekai, who is raised by her older sister, Nani, after the death of their parents, and Experiment 626, a genetically engineered extraterrestrial whom Lilo adopts as her "dog" and renames "Stitch". Designed to cause chaos and destruction, Stitch initially uses Lilo to avoid recapture by an intergalactic federation. Over time, they develop a close bond through the Hawaiian concept of ʻohana, or extended family, leading Stitch to reconsider his destructive purpose.

The film is based on an idea by Sanders, who originally conceived Stitch in 1981, and the film's design and aesthetics are based on his personal art style. Stitch was initially at the center of a children's book Sanders had conceptualized, but later abandoned. A feature-length film starring the character entered development in 1997 when Thomas Schumacher, then the president of Walt Disney Feature Animation, approached Sanders with the objective of producing "the Dumbo for our generation." The use of watercolor backgrounds hearkened back to early Disney productions such as Snow White and the Seven Dwarfs (1937). The film and its accompanying soundtrack made extensive use of the music of Elvis Presley, while Alan Silvestri composed the film's score.

Lilo & Stitch premiered at the El Capitan Theatre in Los Angeles on June 16, 2002, and was theatrically released in the United States on June 21. The film received positive reviews from critics, who praised its story, characters, humor, charm, and originality. Produced on an $80 million budget and promoted with a marketing campaign that played up its oddities, it was a box-office success, grossing over $273 million worldwide. It was nominated for Best Animated Feature at the 75th Academy Awards, but lost to Spirited Away. The film's success made it a highlight of Disney's post-animation renaissance era in the 2000s, spawning a franchise that includes three direct-to-video film sequels, three television series, and a live-action adaptation that was released in 2025.

== Plot ==
On the planet Turo, the United Galactic Federation convicts Dr. Jumba Jookiba of illegal genetic experimentation; he has created Experiment 626, an aggressive, near-indestructible creature with advanced learning capabilities. Captain Gantu is tasked with escorting 626 into exile, but 626 escapes and hijacks a space cruiser that crash-lands on Kauaʻi, Hawaii, on Earth. Shortly after landing, 626 is run over by three passing trucks and taken to an animal shelter. The Federation's Grand Councilwoman offers Jumba early release if he retrieves 626, assisted by Agent Pleakley, the council's Earth expert.

On Kauaʻi, orphaned teenager Nani Pelekai struggles to care for her lonely and rambunctious younger sister, Lilo, after their parents died in a car crash. Social worker Cobra Bubbles doubts Nani's ability to serve as Lilo's guardian and threatens to place Lilo in foster care if their situation does not improve within three days. After overhearing Lilo wish for a friend, Nani takes her to the animal shelter to adopt a dog. Lilo adopts 626, who is impersonating a dog, and names him "Stitch". Jumba and Pleakley, disguised as tourists, attempt to capture Stitch. When Stitch attacks Pleakley at the Lūʻau where Nani works, Nani is blamed and fired. Bubbles orders Nani to find a new job and instructs Lilo to teach Stitch to be a "model citizen".

Despite Lilo's efforts to domesticate Stitch, his destructive behavior repeatedly sabotages Nani's attempts to secure employment. While Nani, Lilo, and Stitch go surfing with Nani's friend and former co-worker David Kawena, Jumba and Pleakley make another attempt to capture Stitch. During the chaos, Stitch unintentionally pulls Lilo underwater; Nani rescues Lilo, and David rescues Stitch. After witnessing the incident, Bubbles informs Nani that he will return the next morning to take Lilo. Guilt-ridden for causing trouble, Stitch runs away. Having failed their mission, Jumba and Pleakley are dismissed by the Grand Councilwoman, who assigns Gantu to capture Stitch. Now unrestrained, Jumba pursues Stitch using more aggressive tactics. When David tells Nani about another job opportunity, she leaves Lilo at home alone. Jumba and Pleakley chase Stitch back to the Pelekai home, and their fight results in an explosion that destroys the house.

Nani secures the job but rushes home after seeing a fire engine heading toward her house, and Bubbles arrives to take Lilo. As he and Nani argue, Lilo runs into the woods and encounters Stitch, who reveals his alien form moments before Gantu captures them both. Stitch escapes just as Gantu's ship departs with Lilo. Nani confronts Stitch, but Jumba and Pleakley capture him as well. When Nani pleads with them to rescue Lilo, they refuse, stating they are only authorized to capture Stitch. As Nani breaks down, Stitch recalls ʻohana, the concept of family that Lilo taught him, and convinces Jumba to help. Jumba, Pleakley, Stitch, and Nani board Jumba's spaceship, pursue Gantu, and rescue Lilo.

The Grand Councilwoman arrives to retrieve Stitch and dismisses Gantu for endangering Lilo as well as failing his mission. After witnessing Stitch's changed behavior and learning that Lilo legally adopted him from the animal shelter, she allows Stitch to remain on Earth to serve his exile. She also places the Pelekai family under the protection of the United Galactic Federation. Bubbles reveals that he is a former CIA agent who previously encountered the Grand Councilwoman in Roswell, New Mexico, in 1973. Stitch, Jumba, and Pleakley become part of Lilo and Nani's family, and together with David and Bubbles, they rebuild the house.

== Voice cast ==
- Daveigh Chase as Lilo Pelekai, an eccentric Hawaiian girl on the island of Kauaʻi who adopts Stitch as her pet dog.
- Chris Sanders as Stitch (originally known as Experiment 626), a blue koala-like illegal genetic experiment with the ability to create untold chaos.
- Tia Carrere as Nani Pelekai, Lilo's adult older sister and legal guardian.
- Jason Scott Lee as David Kawena, Nani's hapless surfer friend who has a crush on her.
- David Ogden Stiers as Dr. Jumba Jookiba, a Kweltikwan mad scientist employed by Galaxy Defense Industries who created Stitch.
- Kevin McDonald as Agent Pleakley, a Plorgonarian Galactic Federation agent who acts as the expert of Earth.
- Ving Rhames as Cobra Bubbles, a social worker in charge of Lilo's welfare and Nani's duties as her guardian.
- Kevin Michael Richardson as Captain Gantu, a large whale-like alien who is the respected but arrogant second-in-command of the Galactic Federation.
- Zoe Caldwell as the Grand Councilwoman, the tall, slender alien leader of the Galactic Federation.
- Miranda Paige Walls as Mertle Edmonds, Lilo's classmate from their hālau hula who despises and derides her.
- Kunewa Mook as Moses Puloki, Lilo's hula teacher.
- Amy Hill as Mrs. Hasagawa, an elderly woman who runs a fruit stand.
- Susan Hegarty as Rescue Lady, who runs the animal shelter where Lilo adopts Stitch.

== Production ==
=== Development ===
A 1985 concept sketch of Stitch by the character's creator Chris Sanders

In 1985, after graduating from California Institute of the Arts, Chris Sanders had created the character of Stitch for an unsuccessful children's book pitch. He said, "I wanted to do a children's book about this little creature that lived in a forest. It was a bit of a monster with no real explanation as to where it came from." He found condensing the story to be difficult, though, and abandoned the project. In 1987, Walt Disney Feature Animation hired him for their newly formed visual development department. His first project was The Rescuers Down Under (1990), but he soon transitioned into storyboarding. After that, Sanders created storyboard sequences for Beauty and the Beast (1991) and The Lion King (1994), and was promoted to head of story on Mulan (1998).

In 1997, several executives at Disney Feature Animation were invited to a retreat at Michael Eisner's farm in Vermont to discuss the future animation slate beyond adapting pre-existing legends, folklore, or classic novels. At the retreat, Thomas Schumacher, then executive vice president of Disney Feature Animation, suggested they produce a film that would be the "Dumbo for our generation", compared to the large-budget Disney animated features they had already done. Schumacher approached Sanders about producing the film, telling him: "Everybody wants this next film to be you."

During a karaoke dinner at the Walt Disney World Swan Resort, Schumacher asked Sanders, "Is there anything you would like to develop?" Sanders remembered the children's book project he had initially developed. At his next meeting, Sanders pitched a remote, nonurban location, with Stitch crash-landing into a forest and interacting entirely with woodland animals, being ostracized by them, and living on his own at a farm in rural Kansas. But Schumacher suggested that Stitch should interact with people, instead: "The animal world is already alien to us. So, if you want to get the best contrast between this monster and the place where it lives, I would recommend you set it in a human world." Sanders later revisited his forest-creature concept in The Wild Robot (2024).

For three straight days in his Palm Springs, Florida, hotel room, Sanders created a 29-page pitch book drawing conceptual sketches and outlining the film's general story. He initially revised it by adding a boy character, but as the character of Stitch evolved, Sanders decided he needed to be contrasted with a female character: "I think Stitch represented a male character, so the balance would be to put him with a little girl. We wanted someone who was going to be in conflict with Stitch, and we realized a little boy might be a comrade." Sanders then glanced at a map of Hawaii on his wall, and recalling he had recently vacationed there, he relocated the story there. Not well versed in Hawaiian culture, Sanders turned to a vacation roadmap, and found the names "Lilo Lane" and "Nani" there. After finishing the booklet, he shipped it to Burbank, and Schumacher approved the pitch with one condition: "it has to look like you drew it."

=== Writing ===
Animation has been set so much in ancient, medieval Europe—so many fairy tales find their roots there, that to place it in Hawaii was kind of a big leap. But that choice went to color the entire movie, and rewrite the story for us.

— Chris Sanders, reflecting on the location change to Hawaii

Dean DeBlois, who had served as "story co-head" for Mulan, was brought on to co-write and co-direct Lilo & Stitch after Thomas Schumacher allowed him to leave production on Atlantis: The Lost Empire (2001). Meanwhile, Disney executive Clark Spencer was assigned as the film's producer. Unlike several previous and concurrent Disney Feature Animation productions, the film's pre-production team remained relatively small and isolated from upper management until the film went into full production.

Originally, Stitch was the leader of an intergalactic gang, and Jumba was one of his former cronies summoned by the Intergalactic Council to capture Stitch. Test audience response to early versions of the film led to changing Stitch and Jumba into creation and creator.

While the animation team visited Kauaʻi to research the locale, their tour guide explained the meaning of ʻohana as it applies to extended families. This concept of ʻohana became an important part of the movie. DeBlois recalls:

No matter where we went, our tour guide seemed to know somebody. He was really the one who explained to us the Hawaiian concept of ʻohana, a sense of family that extends far beyond your immediate relatives. That idea so influenced the story that it became the foundation theme, the thing that causes Stitch to evolve despite what he was created to do, which is destroy.

The island of Kauaʻi had also been featured in such films as Raiders of the Lost Ark (1981) and the Jurassic Park trilogy (1993–2001). Disney's animators faced the daunting task of meshing the film's plot, which showed the impoverished and dysfunctional life that many Hawaiians lived during the then-recent economic downturn, with the island's serene beauty. The actors voicing the film's young adults, Nani and David, were Tia Carrere, a local of Honolulu, and Jason Scott Lee, who is of Hawaiian descent and grew up in Hawaii. Both Carrere and Lee assisted with rewriting their characters' dialogue in proper colloquial dialect, and with adding Hawaiian slang terms.

One innovative and unique aspect of the film is its strong focus on the relationship between two sisters. At the time, a central relationship between sisters as a major plot element was rare in American animated films.

=== Casting ===
Daveigh Chase earned the role of Lilo in the fall of 1998 against 150 other candidates.

Stitch was initially intended to be a nonverbal character, but Sanders said he realized, "he'd have to say a few things, so we made sure that we kept it to a minimum." Instead of hiring a professional actor to voice Stitch, DeBlois suggested Sanders take the role. According to Sanders, Stitch's voice was the one he regularly used "just to bother people at the studio. I'd call people on the phone and do that voice and annoy them."

Tia Carrere was originally considered for the title character in Mulan (1998), but lost the role to Ming-Na Wen. After learning Disney was doing a Hawaii-set film, Carrere sought a voice role and was hired to voice Nani. She spent two years recording her part in Los Angeles, Paris, and Toronto. Jason Scott Lee was cast as David after Carrere recommended him for the film.

Chris Williams, then a storyboard artist, suggested Kevin McDonald for the part of Agent Pleakley. After McDonald read for the part, he was cast. Cobra Bubbles was initially envisioned as more of a nebbish, with Jeff Goldblum in mind for the role. Goldblum declined the role, and Bubbles was reconceived as a more intimidating character. Sanders and DeBlois recalled Ving Rhames's performance in Pulp Fiction (1994) and cast him.

During the film's early development, Ricardo Montalbán was cast as one of the villains, with his vocal performance based on the voice he used for Khan Noonien Singh in Star Trek II: The Wrath of Khan. However, all the lines he recorded were removed and his character was cut after the meeting that lead to the removal of Stitch's gang from the story. Eventually, the villainous role in the film would be Gantu voiced by Kevin Michael Richardson, who is best known for playing villain roles in shows and movies. David Ogden Stiers (who had previously done voices for Disney in past films) was chosen to be the voice of Jumba. Australian actress Zoe Caldwell got the role of voicing the Grand Councilwoman, the leader of the United Galactic Federation.

=== Design and animation ===
The original scene (top) and the one used in the release (bottom): The Boeing 747 and the spaceship are both flying in a sideways position.

In a deviation from several decades' worth of Disney features, Sanders and DeBlois chose to use watercolor-painted backgrounds for Lilo & Stitch, as opposed to the traditional gouache technique. Watercolors had been used for the early Disney animated shorts, as well as the early Disney features Snow White and the Seven Dwarfs (1937), Pinocchio (1940), and Dumbo (1941), but the technique had been largely abandoned by the mid-1940s in favor of less complicated media such as gouache. Sanders preferred that watercolors be used for Lilo & Stitch to evoke both the bright look of a storybook and the art direction of Dumbo, requiring the background artists to be trained in working with the medium.

The animation itself was based on two-dimensional work, since the budget was too small for computer-generated imagery. The character designs were based on Sanders's personal drawing style, rather than the traditional Disney in-house style. To assist the animators with adapting Sanders's style, Sue C. Nichols, the film's visual development supervisor, created a manual, Surfing the Sanders Style. Because of the limited budget, details like pockets or designs on clothing were avoided in the animation process, and since they could not afford to do shadows throughout much of the film, many of the scenes took place in shaded areas, saving shadows for more pivotal scenes.

The film's extraterrestrial elements, such as the spaceships, were designed to resemble marine life, such as whales and crabs. One altered scene in the film involved Stitch, Nani, Jumba, and Pleakley hijacking a Boeing 747 jet from Lihue Airport that scrapes against buildings through downtown Honolulu. After the September 11 attacks, with only a few weeks left in production, the climax was completely reworked to have them use Jumba's spacecraft, instead. The location was also shifted to have them fly through the mountains of Kauaʻi. The final design still retains the engines that resembled the 747's jet engines, according to Sanders.

Despite this adjustment, the team had enough budget for about two additional minutes of animation, which was used to create the epilogue montage of Lilo, Nani, and Stitch becoming a new family.

== Release ==
On June 16, 2002, Lilo & Stitch premiered at the El Capitan Theatre. Alongside the filmmakers, cast members, and Disney studio executives, celebrities such as Priscilla and Lisa Marie Presley, Wynonna Judd, Phil Collins, Gregory Hines, and Jodie Foster were also in attendance.

=== Marketing ===
Wanting Stitch to be a central part of the film's marketing campaign, Sanders pitched a subversive idea: "what if Stitch invaded other Disney properties?" Dick Cook, then chairman of Walt Disney Studios, loved the idea and allowed for four parody teaser trailers to be made (nicknamed "Inter-stitch-als"), in which Stitch crashes memorable moments of four films from the Disney Renaissance (three of which Sanders had worked on): The Little Mermaid (1989), Beauty and the Beast (1991), Aladdin (1992), and The Lion King (1994). Most of the original actors reprised their roles in the trailers, but they were confused when asked to act negatively toward Stitch. Sanders explained, "They were all professional and nice, but I don't think any of the actors were happy about what we were doing because they are those characters to a large degree, so this stuff is really important to them." The trailers also include the AC/DC song "Back in Black".

The marketing campaign also included several tie-in promotions, such as Lilo & Stitch toys being offered as part of McDonald's Happy Meals. In the United Kingdom, Lilo & Stitch trailers and television ads featured a cover of Elvis Presley's song "Suspicious Minds", performed by Gareth Gates, who became famous on the UK TV program Pop Idol. In the U.S., "Hound Dog" was used for both theatrical and television trailers. The marketing campaign presented Stitch as the sort of "Disney Family Black Sheep". As a promotional campaign, comics of Lilo & Stitch ran in Disney Adventures before the film's release. The comics detailed events leading up to the film for both title characters, including Stitch's creation and escape. These events were later contradicted by the sequel Lilo & Stitch 2: Stitch Has a Glitch, rendering the comics noncanonical, but the comics are notable for introducing Experiment 625, Reuben, who was a main character in the subsequent movies and TV series. Most of the comic series have been released as a collective volume, Comic Zone Volume 1: Lilo & Stitch.

=== Home media ===
Lilo & Stitch was released on VHS and DVD on December 3, 2002. During the first day of release, more than 3 million DVD copies were sold, earning $45 million in retail sales. This THX-certified DVD release features various bonus features, including a "Build An Alien Experiment" game, an audio commentary, music videos, deleted scenes, teaser trailers, and DVD-ROM. In 2003, a 2-disc DVD version was announced to come out along with Alice in Wonderland (1951) and Pocahontas (1995), which were released in 2004 and 2005.

A two-disc Special Edition DVD of the film was released in Australia on November 10, 2004, and the UK on August 22, 2005, along with the UK release of Lilo & Stitch 2: Stitch Has a Glitch (2005), but a release in the US was affected by many delays. On March 24, 2009, Disney finally released the special edition DVD, called the "Big Wave Edition". This DVD edition retained the original supplemental features, along with an audio commentary, a two-hour documentary, more deleted scenes, a number of behind-the-scenes featurettes, and some games.

On June 11, 2013, Lilo & Stitch was released on Blu-ray and re-released on DVD alongside Lilo & Stitch 2 in a "2-Movie Collection", which included a single Blu-ray with both films, but without bonus features, a reprint of disc one of the "Big Wave Edition" DVD, and a reprint of the Lilo & Stitch 2 DVD. The "2-Movie Collection" has since seen two re-releases; one on January 31, 2017, containing only the Blu-ray and a code to redeem a digital download of the two films, and another on August 9, 2022, which places both films on separate Blu-ray discs that also contain most of their original DVD bonus features, the two DVDs from the first Blu-ray collection, and a digital download code as with the second Blu-ray collection.

A newly restored and remastered version of the film was released on 4K Ultra HD Blu-ray on May 6, 2025, to coincide with the theatrical release of the live-action remake.

==== Altered scene ====
A scene where Nani chases Lilo was modified for the UK release so the film could secure a U (Universal) certificate from the British Board of Film Classification. In the original, Lilo hid in a clothes dryer, which was changed to a commode with a cupboard that has a pizza box used as a "door" to avoid influencing children to hide in dryers. The UK edit has since become the standardized version of the film across all regions, as it would be used for the film's digital and physical releases beginning with its Disney+ release onward.

== Reception ==
=== Box office ===
Lilo & Stitch opened in second place, earning $35.3 million in its first weekend, ranking narrowly below Steven Spielberg's Minority Report. During its second weekend, it fell to third place, behind Minority Report and Mr. Deeds. Despite the opening of Men in Black II the week after, Lilo & Stitch remained in third place.

Meanwhile, Lilo & Stitch continued to draw in families while other major summer blockbusters such as Spider-Man and Star Wars: Episode II – Attack of the Clones were still in wide release and dominating the box office. Additionally, it went on to compete against the Warner Bros. live-action/animated hybrid film, Scooby-Doo, along with Matt Damon's action film, The Bourne Identity. The film earned $145.8 million in the U.S. and Canada, and $127.3 million internationally, totaling $273.1 million worldwide.

In the UK, Lilo & Stitch collected $2.4 million during its opening weekend, ranking in first place ahead of Signs and My Big Fat Greek Wedding. The film would be overtaken by Red Dragon in its second weekend.

At the end of its theatrical run, Lilo & Stitch earned $145.8 million in the U.S. and Canada, and $127.3 million internationally, totaling $273.1 million worldwide. It became the second-highest-grossing animated film of 2002, behind 20th Century Fox's Ice Age. They were the only two animated films to approach the $100 million mark that year domestically. Box Office Mojo estimates that the film sold over 25 million tickets during its original run.

=== Critical reaction ===
Lilo & Stitch received positive reviews upon release. Rotten Tomatoes reported that the film has an approval rating of 86% based on 152 reviews, with an average rating of 7.3/10. The site's critics consensus reads, "Edgier than traditional Disney fare, Lilo and Stitch explores issues of family while providing a fun and charming story." Metacritic assigned the film a weighted average score of 73 out of 100, based on 30 critics, indicating "generally favorable" reviews. Audiences polled by CinemaScore gave the film an average grade of "A" on an A+ to F scale.

Roger Ebert of the Chicago Sun-Times gave the film 3 1/2 stars out of 4, writing: "It's one of the most charming feature-length cartoons of recent years—funny, sassy, startling, original and with six songs by Elvis. It doesn't get sickeningly sweet at the end, it has as much stuff in it for grown-ups as for kids, and it has a bright offbeat look to it." Kenneth Turan of the Los Angeles Times wrote: "Looser and less obviously formulaic in its fresh approach to our hearts, the brash [film] has an unleashed, subversive sense of humor that's less corporate and more uninhibited than any non-Pixar Disney film has been in time out of mind. With its hand-drawn characters and its use of watercolors for backgrounds (the first time the studio's done that since the 1940s), this is a happy throwback to the time when cartoons were cinema's most idiosyncratic form instead of one of its most predictable." Richard Corliss of Time magazine felt the film is "a bright, engaging bauble with half a dozen Elvis Presley songs for Mom and Dad, and just enough sass. Stitch sticks his tongue into his nose and eats his snot to keep the tweeners giggling ...after a lag in the early sister scenes, Lilo reveals its own very American verve and wit, along with a smart story sense that marks the best animated features, traditional or computerized." Keith Phipps of The A.V. Club wrote: "With its sharp wit and its portrayal of how broken families sometimes fit back together, Lilo would make a fine summer double feature alongside About a Boy, another film that stays funny while dancing around a tiny abyss."

Claudia Puig of USA Today noted the colors "are ultra-vibrant and rich, appropriate to the Hawaiian setting. Best of all, the movie has an endearingly cheeky attitude sometimes missing from more earnest Disney tales. Witty, touching and well-paced, Lilo & Stitch is ideal family fare, but little more." Desson Howe of The Washington Post also praised the film's use of watercolors, writing it is "appealing. It's easy, rather than flashy, on the eyes. And there's some sort of relief in that, in this world of hyper-powerful computer-generated imagery." Owen Gleiberman, reviewing for Entertainment Weekly, argued the "animation in Lilo & Stitch has an engaging retro-simple vivacity, and it's nice to see a movie for tots make use of Elvis Presley, but the story is witless and oddly defanged. Stitch gets discovered by Lilo, a temperamental Hawaiian girl who's the whiniest of whiny brats. These two become friends in theory only: There's so little connection between them that just about the only thing sustaining the movie is its vague E.T. outline."

Todd McCarthy of Variety felt Sanders and DeBlois "keep things moving briskly while commendably avoiding any special sentimental 'We Are a Village' point-making, despite the obvious opportunity. Character designs are familiar enough, but backgrounds possess an unusual pastel quality that gives the film an inviting atmosphere all its own." In contrast, Mick LaSalle of the San Francisco Gate felt Lilo & Stitch was more appropriate for a television series, writing the directors "find themselves locked into the structure of a feature film. They're forced to tell the story of Lilo and Stitch's relationship, to give it shape and a sense of arrival. Since this is a kid's movie, the relationship can only head in the direction of schmaltz. So the promising anarchy of the first 10 or 15 minutes is suppressed."

Peter M. Nichols states that through the character of Nani and her struggles, the film appeals to older children better than such attempts by the studio to do so as The Emperor's New Groove, Atlantis: The Lost Empire, and Treasure Planet.

In 2025, it was one of the films voted for the "Readers' Choice" edition of The New York Times' list of "The 100 Best Movies of the 21st Century", finishing at number 294.

== Soundtrack ==
The film's soundtrack, Lilo & Stitch: An Original Walt Disney Records Soundtrack, was released by Walt Disney Records on June 11, 2002, on Audio CD and compact cassette.

The soundtrack contains two original songs from the film written by Mark Kealiʻi Hoʻomalu and Alan Silvestri (the film's composer), and performed by Hoʻomalu and the Kamehameha Schools Children's Chorus. It also contains five songs by American singer Elvis Presley, and two of his songs re-recorded by contemporary artists. These songs were performed by American singer Wynonna ("Burning Love") and Swedish group A-Teens ("Can't Help Falling in Love").

On June 23, 2003, the soundtrack album was certified platinum by the Recording Industry Association of America (RIAA) for sales of 1 million units. On March 17, 2023, the song "Hawaiian Roller Coaster Ride" also received platinum certification from the RIAA.

"Baby You Belong" by Faith Hill was used as the theme song in the Japanese version. In North America, the song was simply an album track with no connotation to the film.

== Legacy ==
=== Sequels and spin-offs ===
On August 26, 2003, Disney released a direct-to-video sequel, Stitch! The Movie, which served as the pilot to a television series titled Lilo & Stitch: The Series. This series ran for 65 episodes between September 20, 2003, and July 29, 2006. The series carried on where the film left off and charted Lilo and Stitch's efforts to capture and rehabilitate Jumba's remaining experiments. The series, as well as the original parts of the franchise that focused on Lilo Pelekai and were set in Hawaii, ended with the television film Leroy & Stitch, which aired on June 23, 2006.

On August 30, 2005, Lilo & Stitch 2: Stitch Has a Glitch, another direct-to-video sequel to the film, was released. In this film (set between Lilo & Stitch and Stitch! The Movie), Stitch has a glitch because his molecules were never fully charged (this is contrary to an original opening, "Stitch's Trial", which was seen on the DVD release of Lilo & Stitch). Lilo wants to win the May Day hula contest like her mother did in the 1970s, but Stitch continues to have outbursts. Lilo gets increasingly mad at Stitch as his glitch causes more problems for her and ruins her chances of winning the competition. She thinks Stitch is not cooperating properly, until she finds out that Stitch is dying. The Lilo & Stitch 2: Stitch Has a Glitch DVD also contained a short film, The Origin of Stitch, that served as a bridge between Stitch Has a Glitch and Stitch! The Movie.

In March 2008, Disney announced an anime based on the Lilo & Stitch franchise aimed at the Japanese market titled Stitch!. The anime, which ran as a series from October 2008 to March 2011, features a Japanese girl named Yuna Kamihara in place of Lilo, and is set on a fictional island in Okinawa Prefecture instead of Hawaii. This series was produced by Madhouse for its first two seasons, and Shin-Ei Animation for its third season and two post-series specials in 2012 and 2015.

From March 27 to April 6, 2017, an English-language Chinese animated television series based on the franchise titled Stitch & Ai aired in China with a Mandarin Chinese dub. It was produced by Anhui Xinhua Media and Panimation Hwakai Media. Like with the Stitch! anime, it features a local girl named Wang Ai Ling instead of Lilo, and is set in the Huangshan Mountains. Unlike Stitch!, however, this series was originally produced in English in co-operation with American animators (including those who worked on Lilo & Stitch: The Series) and then dubbed into Mandarin Chinese; the original English production aired in Southeast Asia during February 2018.

A new animated short titled Lilo & Scratch was announced at the 2026 Annecy International Animation Film Festival, with Chris Sanders voicing Stitch and Maia Kealoha, who portrayed Lilo in the 2025 live-action film, reprising her live-action role as the character's voice.

=== Live-action adaptation ===
A live-action remake of Lilo & Stitch was released by Disney on May 23, 2025, produced by Aladdin producers Dan Lin and Jonathan Eirich, written by Mike Van Waes and directed by Dean Fleischer Camp. The remake stars Chris Sanders reprising his role as the voice of Stitch, Maia Kealoha as Lilo, Sydney Agudong as Nani, Kaipo Dudoit as David, Courtney B. Vance as Bubbles, Zach Galifianakis as Jumba and Billy Magnussen as Pleakley, while Tia Carrere, the original voice actress of Nani, was announced to play Mrs. Kekoa and Amy Hill, who voiced Mrs. Hasagawa in the original, portray a new character named Tūtū. The character of Gantu was cut from the film as the behest of Fleischer Camp.

=== Video games ===
There were three official games released in 2002 to coincide with the film: Disney's Lilo & Stitch: Trouble in Paradise for PlayStation and Microsoft Windows, Disney's Lilo & Stitch for Game Boy Advance, and Disney's Stitch: Experiment 626 for PlayStation 2. Stitch is also a summonable character in Kingdom Hearts II and III, and appears along with his homeworld in Kingdom Hearts Birth by Sleep for the PlayStation Portable. Lilo and Stitch both appear in the Nintendo 3DS game Disney Magical World and its sequel. Stitch is also a playable character in the Disney Infinity series in the second game, Disney Infinity 2.0, and the series' third and final game, Disney Infinity 3.0. He was also a meet and greet character in Kinect: Disneyland Adventures. Some characters of the film are playable characters in the game Disney Magic Kingdoms. Stitch also appears as a playable character in the mobile game Disney Mirrorverse, and as an unlockable villager Disney Dreamlight Valley. Lilo, Stitch, Jumba, Gantu, and (from Lilo & Stitch: The Series) Angel are playable racers in Disney Speedstorm, which also features a track environment based on the film's depiction of Kauaʻi.

== See also ==
- List of films featuring extraterrestrials

== Bibliography ==
- Wakabayashi, Hiro Clark (2002). Lilo and Stitch: Collected Stories from the Film's Creators. Disney Editions. ISBN 978-0-7868-5382-3.
