= Maia Kealoha =

American child actress (born 2016)

- Kealoha in 2025
- Born: December 15, 2016 (age 9); Kailua-Kona, Hawaii, U.S.
- Occupation: Actress
- Years active: 2023–present
- Notable work: Lilo & Stitch

Maia Kealoha (born December 15, 2016) is an American child actress from Hawaii. She is known for playing Lilo Pelekai in the 2025 live-action adaptation of Lilo & Stitch, for which she earned a Saturn Award nomination for Best Younger Performer in a Film in 2026.

== Early life ==
Maia Kealoha was born on December 15, 2016 in Kailua-Kona, Hawaii. She has been dancing hula since she was little. She started dancing Tahitian dance at the age of two. In 2022, Kealoha won the title of Mini Miss Kona Coffee.

== Career ==
Kealoha's first onscreen role was in the 2025 film Lilo & Stitch, a live-action remake of the 2002 animated film of the same name. She auditioned for the role of Lilo at the age of five, and was cast for the role in 2023. She was later cast as Lani in The Wrecking Crew (2026). She appeared in Disney's musical series, Electric Bloom (2025) as Kaia.

On February 12, 2026 it was announced that she would star in Nutmeg & Mistletoe as Alma. Months later, it was announced on June 26 at the Annecy International Animation Film Festival that she would reprising her role as Lilo in a new 2D/computer-generated animated short set shortly after the events of the original 2002 animated film titled Lilo & Scratch, which is set to release on November 25, 2026 alongside the Disney animated film, Hexed. On November 10, 2026, it was announced that she will lead Stolen Wishes.

== Public image ==
In June 2025, Mayor of Hawaiʻi County, Kimo Alameda, proclaimed June 3, 2025 as Maia Kealoha Day on Hawaii County during a ceremony at the West Hawaiʻi Civic Center. Mayor Alameda said during the ceremony that proclaiming June 3 as Maia Kealoha Day is a tribute to her inspiring journey and serves as a beacon of hope for local girls and kids to pursue their dreams, no matter how big.

She features on Gold House's most impactful Asian Pacific Gold100 list of 2026.

== Filmography ==
Key
†	Denotes films that have not yet been released

Year	Title	Role	Notes
2025	Lilo & Stitch	Lilo Pelekai	Main role
2025	Electric Bloom	Kaia	Episode: "How We Handled an Unexpected Visitor"
2026	The Wrecking Crew	Lani	
2026	Lilo & Scratch	Lilo Pelekai	Voice, short film
2028	Lilo & Stitch 2 †	Lilo Pelekai	Filming
TBA	Nutmeg & Mistletoe †	Alma	Post-production
TBA	Stolen Wishes †	TBA	Pre-production

== Awards and nominations ==
Year	Award	Category	Work	Result	Ref.
2025	Las Vegas Film Critics Society Awards	Best Female Youth Performance (Under 21)	Lilo & Stitch	Nominated	
2026	Saturn Award	Best Younger Performer in a Film	Lilo & Stitch	Nominated	
