= Arianna Rivas =

American actress and model

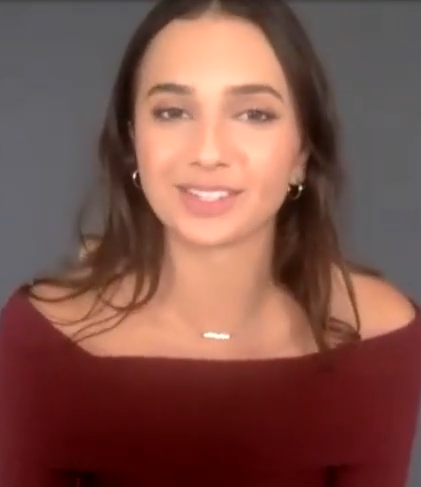
- Rivas in 2025
- Occupation: Actress
- Years active: 2019-present

Arianna Rivas is an American actress. She is known for co-starring in the film A Working Man alongside Jason Statham.

== Career ==
Rivas's first credited appearance in a film production was in 2019, in the short film The Roommate.

Throughout her career, Rivas has appeared in various short films such as Group C, Up in Flames, and Boo Boo Barry. She has also taken part in feature films like Prom Dates and The Harvest. In December 2024, it was announced that she would be joining the cast of Black Phone 2, the sequel to The Black Phone, starring Ethan Hawke. In March 2025, A Working Man premiered, a film she co-stars in with Jason Statham.

== Filmography ==
=== Television ===
- Danger Force (2021) – Season 1, Episode 18 as Bella

=== Short films ===
- The Roommate (2019) as Vivian
- Boo Boo Barry (2019) as Crystal
- Saudade (2020) as Monica
- Group C (2024) as Tiffany
- Up in Flames (2024) as Atsila
- The Wisdom Tree (2024) as the voice of Camille
- Life After (in production) as Kristina

=== Film ===
- The Harvest (2023) as Julie
- Prom Dates (2024) as Lexi
- A Working Man (2025) as Jenny García
- Black Phone 2 (2025) as Mustang
- Nutmeg & Mistletoe (TBA)
