= Ripple (TV series) =

- Genre: Drama
- Created by: Michele Giannusa
- Showrunners: Michele Giannusa; Joni Lefkowitz
- Starring: Ian Harding; Julia Chan; Sydney Agudong; Frankie Faison; Vanessa Smythe; Robert Bazzochi
- Composers: Kristjan Bergey; Joel Schwartz
- Country of origin: United States
- Original language: English
- No. of seasons: 1
- No. of episodes: 8

Production
- Executive producers: Michele Giannusa; Joni Lefkowitz; Darren Giblin; Jocelyn Hamilton; Marquita Robinson; Amanda Tapping
- Producer: Jessica Daniel
- Production location: Toronto
- Cinematography: Jordan Oram
- Editors: Paul G. Day; Erin Deck; Shelley Therrien
- Running time: 41 minutes
- Production company: Lionsgate Television

Original release
- Network: Netflix
- Release: December 3, 2025

Ripple is an American television drama series created by Michele Giannusa. The eight-episode season premiered on Netflix on December 3, 2025, starring Ian Harding, Julia Chan, Sydney Agudong, Frankie Faison, Vanessa Smythe, and Robert Bazzochi.

== Premise ==
Set in New York City, Ripple follows four strangers (Nate, Kris, Aria and Walter) whose lives become intertwined after several chance encounters with one another. Beyond the struggles of daily life, each character is grappling with their own personal issues, from poor health and career doubts to family loss, grief and more. After the characters come together, they lean on one another to get through their challenges.

== Cast ==
=== Main ===
- Ian Harding as Nate, the owner of a bar called 'Lumi West'
- Julia Chan as Kris, a record executive
- Sydney Agudong as Aria, an aspiring musician
- Frankie Faison as Walter, a retired widower
- Vanessa Smythe as Claire, Anna's mother and Nate's wife
- Robert Bazzocchi as John, Aria's husband

=== Recurring ===
- Sarah Swire as Ellis, a non-binary artist and employee at Lumi West
- Marci T. House as Tara Martin, the leader of a grief support group
- Hazel Lagrendeur as Anna Perry, Nate and Claire’s six-year-old daughter. Anna is deaf and primarily communicates using American Sign Language.
- Isabella Astbury as Finn, a young cancer patient
- Eden Broda as Rebecca, Ellis' partner
- Lyra Xhoci as Nurse Angela
- Nicola Correa-Damude as Sylvie
- Kelly Fanson as Rose, Aria's mother
- Tina Lifford as Brenda, Walter's late wife
- LisaGay Hamilton as Georgia, Walter's admirer
- Stephanie Moran as Desi
- Christian de la Cortina as Davide, Finn's Father
- Milton Barnes as Bill Fisher
- Chantel Riley as Dr. Anderson, a therapist
- Danny Waugh as Dr. Ross
- Jasmine Ward as Carrie
- Shanice Johnson as Celia, Walter's sister
- Bayean Hoffman as young Walter
- Roy Lewis as Pastor Michael

== Episodes ==
No.	Title	Directed by	Written by	Original release date
1	"A Stone's Throw"	Amanda Tapping	Michele Giannusa	December 3, 2025
2	"Drip, Drip, Drip"	Amanda Tapping	Michele Giannusa	December 3, 2025
3	"The Twenty"	Scott Smith	Joni Lefkowitz	December 3, 2025
4	"The Storm"	Scott Smith	Marquita Robinson	December 3, 2025
5	"The Flyer"	Melanie Orr	Eva Taylor	December 3, 2025
6	"The White Coat"	Melanie Orr	Jerry Kontogiorgis	December 3, 2025
7	"The Gift"	Lisa Soper	Joni Lefkowitz	December 3, 2025
8	"The Bonus"	Lisa Soper	Michele Giannusa	December 3, 2025

== Production ==
Ripple was filmed primarily in Toronto and was directed by Melanie Orr, Lisa Soper, Scott Smith, and Amanda Tapping. Writers include Michele Giannusa, Eva Taylor, Joni Lefkowitz, Jerry Kontogiorgis, and Marquita Robinson.

The series was originally ordered by Hallmark Channel in 2024 for its planned streaming platform. Following changes to the project’s distribution plans, Ripple was released on Netflix in 2025.

Ripple includes a deaf character, Anna, portrayed by a deaf actor. Coverage of the series noted this casting choice within broader discussions of deaf representation in film and television. The actors who play Anna's parents and friends were taught by a dedicated team of teachers and staff as an intro to ASL and deaf culture to prepare them for their roles in the show.

== Reception ==
Panashe Nyadundu of Elle (magazine) described Ripple as a "bingeable emotional drama," calling it "the wholesome series that your watch list has been waiting for."

Ian Harding discussed the series’ themes of fate, loss, and resilience in an interview with Binge News, describing the show as grounded and character-driven. He noted that the ensemble cast explored how individuals respond when long-held assumptions are disrupted, and praised the collaborative atmosphere on set.
