= Nutmeg & Mistletoe =

- Directed by: Peter Herro
- Written by: Jennifer Bascom; Deborah Dodge
- Produced by: Stacy Jorgensen; Julia Knox; Charlie Cleveland; Peter Herro
- Starring: Madeleine Arthur; Sarah Jeffery; Arianna Rivas; Maia Kealoha; Nia Vardalos
- Cinematography: Tom Magill
- Production company: Abyssal Films
- Country: United States
- Language: English

Nutmeg & Mistletoe is an upcoming American Christmas comedy film directed by Peter Herro and written by Jennifer Bascom and Deborah Dodge. It stars Madeleine Arthur, Sarah Jeffery, Arianna Rivas, Maia Kealoha, and Nia Vardalos.

== Premise ==
Alma is a young girl who notices that her town has lost the festive spirit. Instead of wanting Christmas gifts, she writes a heartfelt letter to Santa Claus asking for help.

== Cast ==
- Maia Kealoha as Alma
- Madeleine Arthur as Mistletoe
- Sarah Jeffery as Nutmeg
- Arianna Rivas
- Nia Vardalos
- Cedric Yarbrough
- Jeff Meacham
- Angelique Cabral
- Tyler Barnhardt
- Reid Miller

== Production ==
In December 2024, it was announced that Peter Herro would be directing a Christmas comedy film, written by Jennifer Bascom and Deborah Dodge. Principal photography began on January 30, 2026, in Los Angeles. Madeleine Arthur, Sarah Jeffery, Arianna Rivas, Maia Kealoha, Nia Vardalos, Cedric Yarbrough, Jeff Meacham, Angelique Cabral, Tyler Barnhardt, and Reid Miller rounded out the cast. Filming wrapped on February 12, 2026.

== Release ==
Nutmeg & Mistletoe was scheduled to be released in the United States on December 25, 2026.
