= Senior Year (2022 film) =

2022 teen comedy film by Alex Hardcastle

- Official release poster
- Directed by: Alex Hardcastle
- Screenplay by: Andrew Knauer; Arthur Pielli; Brandon Scott Jones
- Story by: Andrew Knauer; Arthur Pielli
- Produced by: Todd Garner; Rebel Wilson; Timothy M. Bourne; Chris Bender
- Starring: Rebel Wilson; Angourie Rice; Mary Holland; Sam Richardson; Zoë Chao; Justin Hartley; Chris Parnell
- Cinematography: Marco Fargnoli
- Edited by: Sarah Lucky
- Music by: Jermaine Stegall
- Production companies: Paramount Pictures; Paramount Players; Broken Road Productions; Camp Sugar
- Distributed by: Netflix
- Release date: May 13, 2022
- Running time: 111 minutes
- Country: United States
- Language: English

Senior Year is a 2022 American comedy film directed by Alex Hardcastle in his feature film directorial debut from a screenplay by Andrew Knauer, Arthur Pielli, and Brandon Scott Jones. The film stars Rebel Wilson (who also produced) as a 37-year-old woman who awakens from a 20-year coma and decides to go back to high school to earn her diploma. Her teenage version is played by Angourie Rice. Mary Holland, Sam Richardson, Zoe Chao, Justin Hartley, and Chris Parnell also star. The film was released by Netflix on May 13, 2022.

== Plot ==
In 1999, after a disastrous birthday party at the local "cool" spot, Rock N' Bowl, with her friends Seth and Martha, 14-year-old Australian immigrant Stephanie Conway decides to become one of "the populars". She spends the next few years giving herself a makeover, becoming cheer squad captain, dating popular boy Blaine, and becoming one of the most popular girls by senior year.

In 2002, Stephanie plans to win prom queen in hopes of becoming like Deanna Russo, an alumna of her high school who got married after graduation, and now lives in a mansion. She lives with her widowed father Jim and is still friends with Martha and Seth, who secretly has a crush on her. Stephanie regularly argues over prom preparations with Blaine's ex-girlfriend Tiffany, who fears Stephanie might win the coveted prom queen title. At a cheer performance during a pep rally, Tiffany convinces friends to sabotage Stephanie's landing, putting her into a deep coma. In 2022, Stephanie, now 37, wakes from the coma. Jim and Martha, now principal and cheerleading coach at Harding High, take her home. On the way, stopping at Deanna Russo's old house, Stephanie sees the now-married Tiffany and Blaine reside there.

With reluctant support from Jim and Martha, Stephanie goes back to finish her senior year. There, she discovers Seth is now the librarian, and the honors of prom king and queen have been abolished. Additionally, Tiffany and Blaine's daughter Bri is one of the most popular girls at school with a huge social media following. Cheerleaders are no longer the popular students and perform bland, sanitized routines with no dancing.

Stephanie works to regain her former popularity through social media, finally succeeding after a risqué cheer routine she choreographs without Martha's permission goes viral at a pep rally. The next day, Martha confronts her, telling her that she and Seth felt abandoned when Stephanie became popular in high school.

Stephanie attends a showing of Deep Impact with Seth, and they get closer after goading Tiffany into getting kicked out of the theater for being disruptive. Afterwards, they have drinks at the Rock N' Bowl and Stephanie confesses that she wants to be elected prom queen so badly to make her late mother proud.

Tiffany uses Bri's influence to get the prom king and queen contest reinstated and invites everyone at school except Stephanie to a prom afterparty at their house. Stephanie hosts her own at Martha's lake house without her knowledge. Seth goes to prom with Stephanie but is hurt when he sees Blaine attempt to kiss her, not knowing that Blaine was drunk and tried to force himself. Bri's boyfriend Lance becomes prom king, and although Tiffany rigs the vote so Bri will win, Bri drops out so Stephanie is the queen. As Stephanie and Lance share the prom king and queen dance, the school rallies around her. Bri tells everyone to attend Stephanie's afterparty, which is successful until Tiffany gets it shut down. Martha angrily confronts Stephanie for using her lake house without asking.

On the way home, Stephanie realizes her Lyft driver is a middle-aged Deanna Russo. Deanna reveals that before she turned 30, her husband divorced her for a 21-year-old. Since she did not have a college degree, she was not able to build a life for herself and now works several part-time jobs while struggling to pay for community college. Deanna urges Stephanie not to repeat her mistakes.

Bri arrives home, furious that Tiffany had Stephanie's party shut down, and points out she has not even asked if she was okay. Bri points out that both of Tiffany's parents are miserable together and forces her to apologize to Stephanie. Stephanie accepts Tiffany's apology and encourages her to focus more on her daughter instead of keeping up appearances.

Stephanie tears down her popularity board and contemplates skipping graduation, but Jim convinces her to attend. Streaming an apology to her followers and friends, she promises to be her true self from now on. At graduation, her friends and family secretly organize Stephanie's senior year cheer routine. She makes up with Martha, finally kisses Seth, and welcomes Tiffany to join them on stage as she gets to pull off the move she did not get to do twenty years earlier.

In a mid-credits scene, Stephanie makes plans to attend college.

== Cast ==
- Rebel Wilson as Stephanie "Steph" Conway
  - Angourie Rice as Teen Stephanie "Steph" Conway
- Sam Richardson as Seth Novacelik
  - Zaire Adams as Teen Seth Novacelik
- Zoë Chao as Tiffany "Tiff" Blanchette-Balbo
  - Ana Yi Puig as Teen Tiffany "Tiff" Blanchette
- Mary Holland as Martha "Marth" Reiser
  - Molly Brown as Teen Martha "Marth" Reiser
- Justin Hartley as Blaine Balbo
  - Tyler Barnhardt as Teen Blaine Balbo
- Chris Parnell as Jim Conway
- Michael Cimino as Lance Harrison
- Jeremy Ray Taylor as Neil
- Brandon Scott Jones as Mr. T
- Alicia Silverstone as Deanna Russo
- Joshua Colley as Yaz
- Jade Bender as Britney Jean "Bri" Balbo
- Avantika as Janet Singh

Cameos

- Lucy Taylor as Lydia Conway
- Merrick McCartha as Principal Young
- Tiffany Denise Hobbs as Dr. Jean Johnson
- Lauren Halperin as Nurse
- Steve Aoki as Himself

== Production ==
In February 2021, Rebel Wilson was announced to star in the film. June 2021, Alicia Silverstone joined the cast. In July 2021, Jade Bender, Michael Cimino, Jeremy Ray Taylor, Avantika, Joshua Colley, newcomer Ana Yi Puig, Molly Brown, Zaire Adams, and Tyler Barnhardt were added to the cast.

Principal photography began in Atlanta, Georgia, on May 24, 2021, during the COVID-19 pandemic. Filming was completed by July 2021.

== Reception ==
On the review aggregator website Rotten Tomatoes, 23% of 60 critics' reviews are positive, with an average rating of 4.3/10. The website's consensus reads: "In spite of a premise that promises to highlight Rebel Wilson with the appropriate level of pomp and circumstance, Senior Year is strictly remedial." Metacritic, which uses a weighted average, assigned the film a score of 47 out of 100, based on 13 critics, indicating "mixed or average" reviews.

Screen Rant criticized Senior Year's over-reliance on millennial nostalgia at the expense of story and character development, saying "The issue is Senior Year gets so caught up with referencing the early aughts that it forgets to have any depth to its story." In a two-star review, Christy Lemire of RogerEbert.com commended the performance of Angourie Rice, citing that "she accurately channels Wilson's sly, deadpan delivery". The Guardian criticized the film's humor, calling it "an R-rated comedy that wants to be both sweet and salty, a balance it never manages to perfect".

== See also ==
- Comali
