= Tyler Barnhardt =

American actor (born 1993)

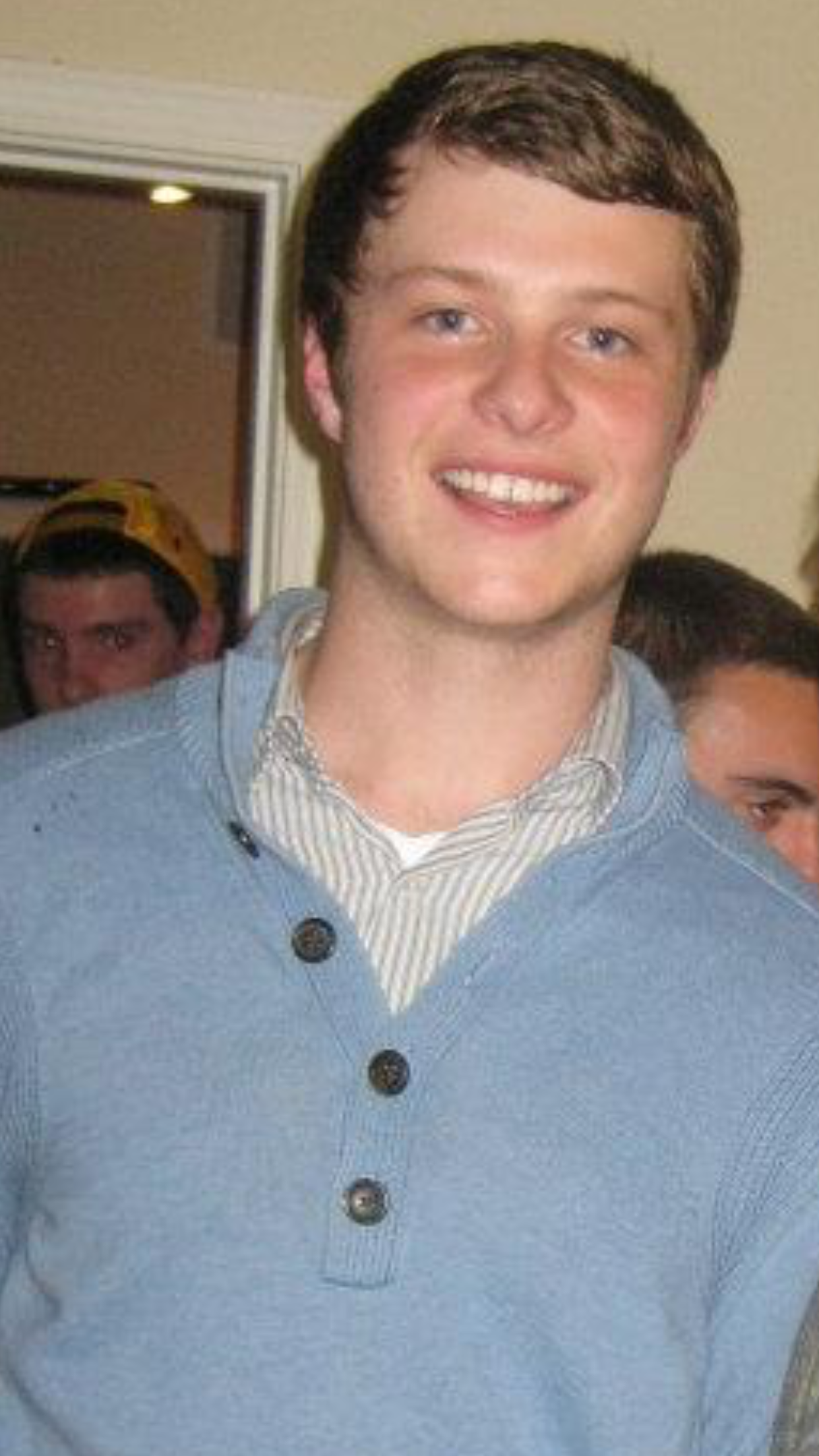
- Barnhardt in 2012
- Born: Tyler Davis Barnhardt; January 13, 1993 (age 33); Raleigh, North Carolina, U.S.
- Education: David W. Butler High School; University of North Carolina at Greensboro (BFA)
- Occupation: Actor
- Years active: 2016–present
- Spouse: Adriana Schaps (m. 2023)

Tyler Davis Barnhardt (born January 13, 1993) is an American actor. He is known for his roles as Matthew Roe in the American period drama television series Underground and Charlie St. George in the American teen drama streaming television series 13 Reasons Why. Barnhardt had a supporting role in the 2022 American comedy film Senior Year.

== Early life and education ==
Barnhardt was born in Raleigh, North Carolina, and was raised in Matthews, a suburb of Charlotte. He graduated from David W. Butler High School in 2011. Barnhardt earned a bachelor of fine arts degree in theater from the University of North Carolina at Greensboro's School of Music, Theatre and Dance in 2015.

== Career ==
In 2016 Barnhardt appeared on an episode of Turn: Washington's Spies. In 2017 Barnhardt was cast as Matthew Roe in the second season of the television series Underground and had a small role on the show Scorpion. In 2019 he was cast as Charlie St. George on the American streaming television series 13 Reasons Why, making his debut in the third season. Later in 2019 he was cast as a main character in the television drama series Tales from the Loop.

In November 2019 Barnhardt was featured on the cover of Visual Tales magazine.

== Personal life ==
Barnhardt married Adriana Schaps on June 17, 2023, at the Siempre in Draper, Utah. The ceremony, officiated by Adam Rippon, was attended by one hundred and thirty guests including Timothy Granaderos, Ross Butler, and Ella Balinska.

== Filmography ==
=== Film ===
Year	Title	Role	Notes
2017	Laura Gets a Cat	Dylan	Feature film
2017	Essex	Jake	Short film
2022	Senior Year	Young Blaine Balboa	Feature film
2024	Pelican	Man	Short film
TBA	Nutmeg & Mistletoe †	TBA	Post-production

=== Television ===
Year	Title	Role	Notes
2016	Turn: Washington's Spies	Sentry	Episode: "Blade on the Feather"
2016	The Jury	Michael Cleary	Television film
2017	Underground	Matthew Roe	3 episodes
2017	Bull	Carter Hayes	Episode: "A Business of Flavors"
2017	Scorpion	Airman Jacobs	Episode: "Nuke Kids on the Block"
2018	Suspicion	Marco	Television film
2019	The Passage	Jacob	
2019–2020	13 Reasons Why	Charlie St. George	Recurring (season 3); main (season 4)
2020	Tales from the Loop	Danny Jansson	2 episodes
2020	All Rise	Jesse Frost	2 episodes
2022–2024	Bel-Air	Connor Satterfield	11 episodes
2022	This Is Us	Mike	Episode: "Every Version of You"
2024–present	The Sex Lives of College Girls	Calvin	3 episodes
