= Lilo & Stitch (2025 film) =

2025 film by Dean Fleischer Camp

- Theatrical release poster
- Directed by: Dean Fleischer Camp
- Screenplay by: Chris Kekaniokalani Bright; Mike Van Waes
- Based on: Lilo & Stitch productions (Note: Although the film is considered to be directly a remake of Lilo & Stitch, the Writers Guild of America considers all four prior Lilo & Stitch films (Lilo & Stitch, Stitch! The Movie, Lilo & Stitch 2: Stitch Has a Glitch, and Leroy & Stitch) and three television series (Lilo & Stitch: The Series, Stitch!, and Stitch & Ai), collectively referred to by the union as the "Lilo & Stitch Productions", to be the source material for this film.)
- Produced by: Jonathan Eirich; Dan Lin
- Starring: Sydney Elizebeth Agudong; Billy Magnussen; Hannah Waddingham; Chris Sanders; Courtney B. Vance; Zach Galifianakis; Maia Kealoha
- Cinematography: Nigel Bluck
- Edited by: Adam Gerstel; Phillip J. Bartell
- Music by: Dan Romer
- Production companies: Walt Disney Pictures; Rideback
- Distributed by: Walt Disney Studios; Motion Pictures
- Release dates: May 17, 2025 (El Capitan Theatre); May 23, 2025 (United States)
- Running time: 108 minutes
- Country: United States
- Language: English
- Budget: $100 million
- Box office: $1.038 billion

Lilo & Stitch is a 2025 American science fiction comedy-drama film produced by Walt Disney Pictures and Rideback. Directed by Dean Fleischer Camp, it is a live-action animated remake of Disney's 2002 traditionally animated film Lilo & Stitch. The film stars Sydney Elizebeth Agudong, Billy Magnussen, Hannah Waddingham, Courtney B. Vance, Zach Galifianakis, and Maia Kealoha in her film debut, with original Lilo & Stitch writer-director Chris Sanders reprising his voice role as Stitch.

Development on a live-action remake of Lilo & Stitch began in October 2018, with writer Mike Van Waes and producers Dan Lin and Jonathan Eirich attached. By November 2020, Jon M. Chu was in talks to direct, while Van Waes left the project despite still being credited. Fleischer Camp and Chris Kekaniokalani Bright were announced as the film's new director and writer respectively in July 2022, with casting taking place between November 2022 and June 2023. Principal photography ran from April to July 2023, filming during the 2023 Writers Guild of America strike until suspending production due to the 2023 SAG-AFTRA strike, and then in February and March 2024 after both strikes ended. Dan Romer composed the score, and Industrial Light & Magic provided the film's visual effects with the assistance of several other effects houses.

Lilo & Stitch premiered at the El Capitan Theatre in Los Angeles on May 17, 2025, and was released in the United States on May 23, by Walt Disney Studios Motion Pictures. The film received generally positive reviews from critics, and grossed $1.038 billion worldwide, becoming the fourth-highest-grossing film of 2025 and the highest-grossing live-action/animated hybrid in history, being the first of its kind to gross over $1 billion. A sequel, with Sanders writing and directing, is in development for release on May 26, 2028.

== Plot ==
On planet Turo, Dr. Jumba Jookiba is convicted by the United Galactic Federation of illegal genetic experimentation, for creating an aggressive, near-indestructible creature with advanced learning capabilities called Experiment 626. Jumba is imprisoned, while 626 is exiled for his destructive behavior. However, 626 escapes by stealing a police cruiser and using its hyperdrive to reach Earth, crashing on Kauaʻi. The Grand Councilwoman offers Jumba freedom if he recaptures 626, pairing him with Earth expert, Agent Pleakley.

A Hawaiian girl named Lilo Pelekai is expelled from hula school for pushing her bully Mertle off stage due to frustration over her sister Nani's absence. Their social worker, Mrs. Kekoa, visits and finds Nani unfit to care for Lilo, demanding she complete her tasks in three days. Elsewhere, 626 crashes near a wedding reception and is run over by a tourist trolley before being taken to an animal shelter.

The next day, having heard that Lilo wants a friend, their neighbor Tūtū takes Lilo to the animal shelter where 626 is kept. Realizing Jumba and Pleakley are after him, 626 impersonates as a dog and allows Lilo to adopt him for his protection. Nani takes them to her resort lūʻau job with her friend David Kawena. Lilo names 626 "Stitch" after Nani comments on having to stitch a car seat he tore. They enjoy the resort, but Stitch accidentally causes a table fire, leading to Nani's dismissal.

Nani is visited by Kekoa and Cobra Bubbles, a CIA agent posing as Kekoa's social director to investigate Stitch's arrival. Kekoa insists that Nani find new employment immediately. However, she is rejected after many interviews due to Lilo and Stitch's antics. Lilo helps Nani secure a job as a surfing instructor, and they enjoy surfing after her first shift. Meanwhile, Jumba and Pleakley fail to capture Stitch while jet skiing, causing the Pelekais and Stitch to wipe out, almost drowning Lilo when Stitch sinks.

After Lilo's recovery, Kekoa informs Nani that the Hawaiian government will cover her health insurance costs if she relinquishes her guardianship—a decision she reluctantly accepts. As the sisters share a final night together, Stitch reflects on his actions and forlornly returns to the animal shelter alone. Meanwhile, the Grand Councilwoman, frustrated with Jumba's failure to capture Stitch, cancels their deal and orders Pleakley to return Jumba to prison. However, Jumba escapes Pleakley and plans to capture Stitch instead.

Kekoa and Bubbles arrive the next morning to find that Lilo is missing, so they and Nani start searching for her. Lilo finds Stitch at the shelter, but Jumba arrives to recapture Stitch. They escape to the Pelekais' home and fight Jumba, destroying their house. During the battle, Jumba reveals that Stitch used Lilo for his protection, leading to a guilt-ridden Stitch's surrender. Jumba takes Stitch aboard his spaceship using a portal-generating gun, intending to erase Stitch's newfound empathy. However, Lilo sneaks aboard and frees Stitch, and they eject Jumba from the ship. The ship crashes into the ocean, trapping Lilo and Stitch underwater. Stitch rescues her, but as he cannot swim to the surface, he releases her to let her emerge and drowns.

Nani and David rescue Lilo, but she refuses to leave Stitch. David returns Lilo to shore while Nani swims back to get Stitch from the ocean floor. They reach shore, but Stitch remains unconscious. After Bubbles finds Pleakley and they rejoin the group, David revives Stitch by jump-starting his lungs. Shortly after, the Grand Councilwoman arrives and re-arrests Jumba. After seeing Stitch's change of heart, she decides to let Stitch exile on Earth with his newfound ʻohana. The Grand Councilwoman vows to keep in touch, with Pleakley living with the Pelekais to watch over Stitch. As the Pelekais, Stitch, and company return home, Kekoa tells Nani she can transfer Lilo's guardianship to David, Tūtū and Bubbles, letting her stay home. The ʻohana then repairs the house and lives happily.

In a mid-credits scene, Nani, now attending the University of California, San Diego to study marine biology with Lilo's blessing, uses Jumba's portal gun to visit Lilo and Stitch in Kauaʻi.

== Cast ==
- Maia Kealoha as Lilo Pelekai, an orphaned six-year-old Native Hawaiian girl "who loves hula, surfing, and wildlife, with a special affinity for all things 'gross'." She is very imaginative yet rebellious and impulsive, which gets her into trouble often.
- Sydney Elizebeth Agudong as Nani Pelekai, the older sister of Lilo and her legal guardian. She is described as "intelligent, overachieving, athletic, Type A" and a "straight-A student" who has been feeling the increasing pressures of having to take care of Lilo, causing issues with her and Lilo's social worker, with child protective services threatening to separate the Pelekai sisters and put Lilo into foster care.
- Chris Sanders as the voice of Stitch, a blue koala-like illegal alien genetic experiment known as Experiment 626, who is adopted by Lilo as a "dog". He is described as "unruly, impulsive, and freakishly strong; he's a furry, ugly-cute wrecking ball seemingly bent on destroying everything in his path." Sanders, who wrote and directed the original animated film alongside Dean DeBlois, created the character and originated the role.
- Zach Galifianakis as the voice of Dr. Jumba Jookiba, the mad scientist who created Stitch. He is more malicious in this film compared to his traditionally-animated counterpart and speaks with an American accent instead of a Russian accent.
  - Galifianakis also physically portrays "Marcus", Jumba's human disguise based on a hotel employee with that name.
- Billy Magnussen as the voice of Agent Wendell Pleakley, a deputized agent of the United Galactic Federation and their "expert" on Earth, sent to prevent Jumba from harming any humans while hunting Stitch.
  - Magnussen also portrays Pleakley's human disguise, which is based on an unnamed human who was interacting with the real Marcus when Jumba and Pleakley copied their appearances.
- Courtney B. Vance as Cobra Bubbles, a CIA agent sent to capture Stitch. While he is not the Pelekais' social worker in this film, he goes undercover as a social director after finding out about Stitch being with the Pelekais.
- Amy Hill as Tūtū, a Native Hawaiian in her 70s who is the long-time neighbor of the Pelekais and the grandmother of David Kawena. She is described as "a warm, quick-witted woman who speaks with a local Pidgin accent". She is original to this film. Hill previously voiced Mrs. Hasagawa in the original film and Lilo & Stitch: The Series. In Hawaiian culture, the word "tutu" is commonly used to refer to grandparents.
- Tia Carrere as Mrs. Kekoa, a social worker who is "a practical, by-the-book kind and patient woman who checks in regularly with Nani", but is nevertheless aware of Nani's struggles to keep up with her duties. Carrere previously voiced Nani in Lilo & Stitch animated media.
- Kaipo Dudoit as David Kawena, a fire performer and lifeguard who is a loyal friend and neighbor to Lilo and Nani. He performs the "fire knife dance" at the lūʻau where he and Nani work at. Kahiau Machado was originally cast in the role, but he was recast shortly thereafter due to his prior usage of a racial slur.
- Hannah Waddingham as the voice of the Grand Councilwoman, the grey alien leader of the United Galactic Federation and its council who orders Jumba and Pleakley to capture Stitch after his escape.
- Jason Scott Lee as the manager for the resort lū'au Nani and David work at called "Jimmy's Luau". Lee previously voiced David in the original film and Lilo & Stitch 2: Stitch Has a Glitch (2005).
- Celia Kenney as AJ, an animal shelter worker
- Skyler Bible as Agent Foster, a CIA agent
- Judy Nguyen as Agent Huynh, a CIA agent
- Christian Yeung as Agent Zhao, a CIA agent
- Emery Hookano-Briel as Mertle Edmonds, Lilo's hula classmate and bully
- David Hekili Kenui Bell (credited as David H.K. Bell) as the "Big Hawaiian Dude", based on the non-speaking "Ice Cream Man" from the animated productions. This version of the character is a native Hawaiian as opposed to a sunburned Caucasian tourist and eats and drops shave ice instead of ice cream while audibly expressing surprise over Pleakley's real appearance being briefly revealed and later Jumba's spaceship flying by. This was Bell's final role before his death on June 12, 2025.
- Mike Mitchell as the voice of the Hammerhead Guard, an unidentified hammerhead shark-like alien who originally guarded Stitch.
- Karly McGowan as the voice of the Adorable Psycho, an unidentified axolotl-like alien who wants to blow up Earth.
- Ashley Lambert as the voice of the ship

== Production ==
=== Development ===
On October 3, 2018, it was announced that Walt Disney Pictures was developing a live-action/computer-generated animation hybrid film remake of Disney's 2002 animated feature film Lilo & Stitch. The film was set to be adapted by Mike Van Waes, produced by Dan Lin and Jonathan Eirich, and co-produced by Ryan Halprin. On October 24, 2018, Van Waes revealed that he began to work on the remake's script. On November 13, 2020, Jon M. Chu entered talks to direct the film, while Van Waes was reported to have left the project, with the studio looking for a new screenwriter to re-write Van Waes's script, though Chu would ultimately not direct the film due to other obligations. On July 14, 2022, Deadline Hollywood reported that Dean Fleischer Camp was chosen to direct instead, while Chris Kekaniokalani Bright was in talks to rewrite the script; Bright was fully confirmed to be the writer in February 2023. The day after Deadline Hollywood's announcement of Fleischer Camp and Bright's involvement, Van Waes quote tweeted from Deadline Hollywood's tweet on their article, welcoming Fleischer Camp and Bright to the film's production, possibly indicating that he is still involved with the film; this was later confirmed by the Writers Guild of America West listing both Bright and Van Waes as the film's screenwriters. Prior to Fleischer Camp's appointment as director, the producers were briefly in talks with Destin Daniel Cretton to direct.

The film was given the working title Bad Dog, a reference to Stitch being mistaken for and adopted as a dog, while the new production company established for the film was named "Blue Koala Pictures, Inc." in reference to a typical description of the character's physical appearance.

=== Casting ===
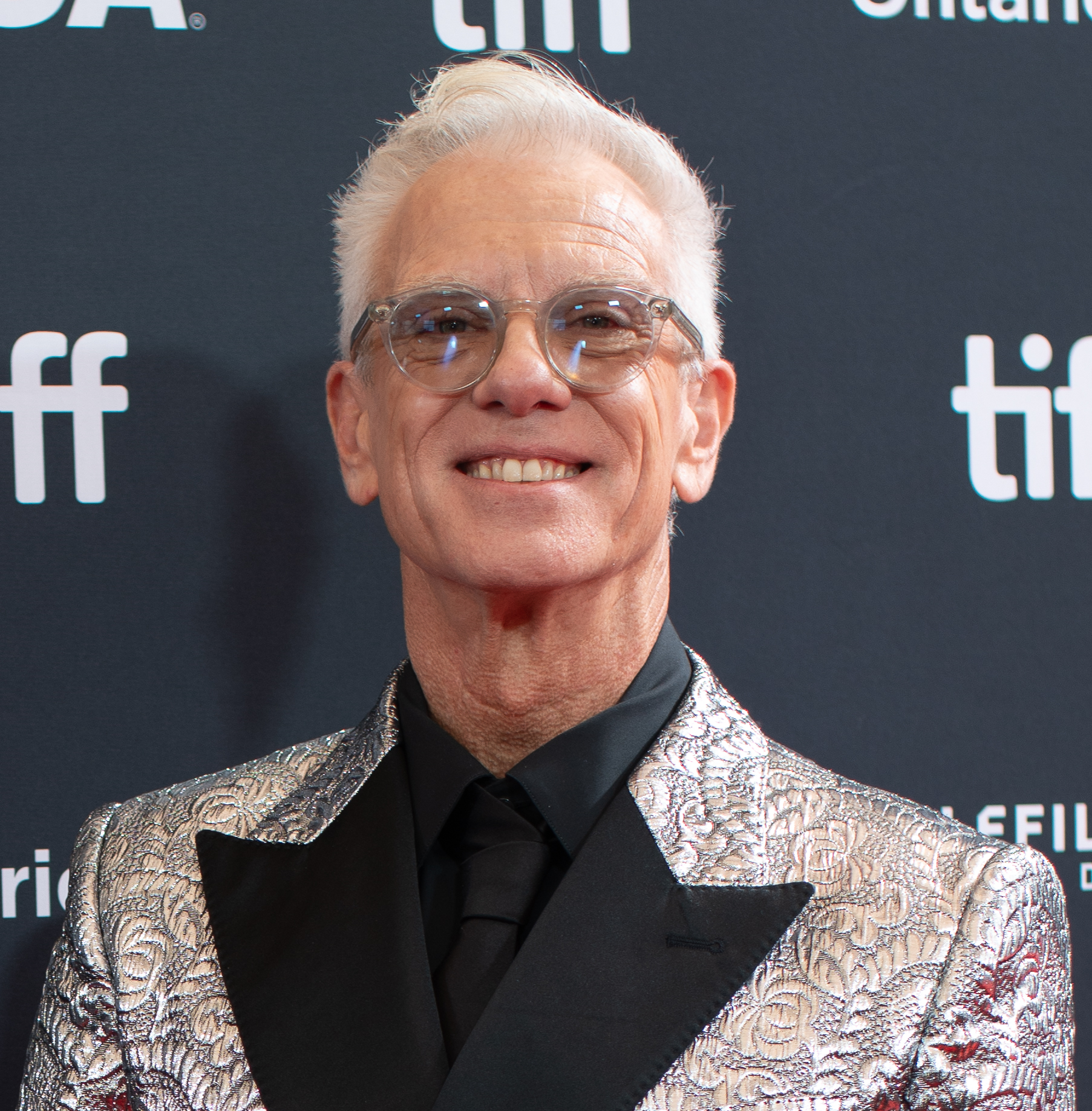
Chris Sanders
(Stitch)

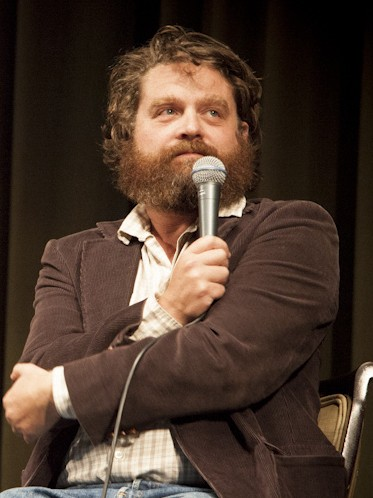
Zach Galifianakis
(Dr. Jumba Jookiba)

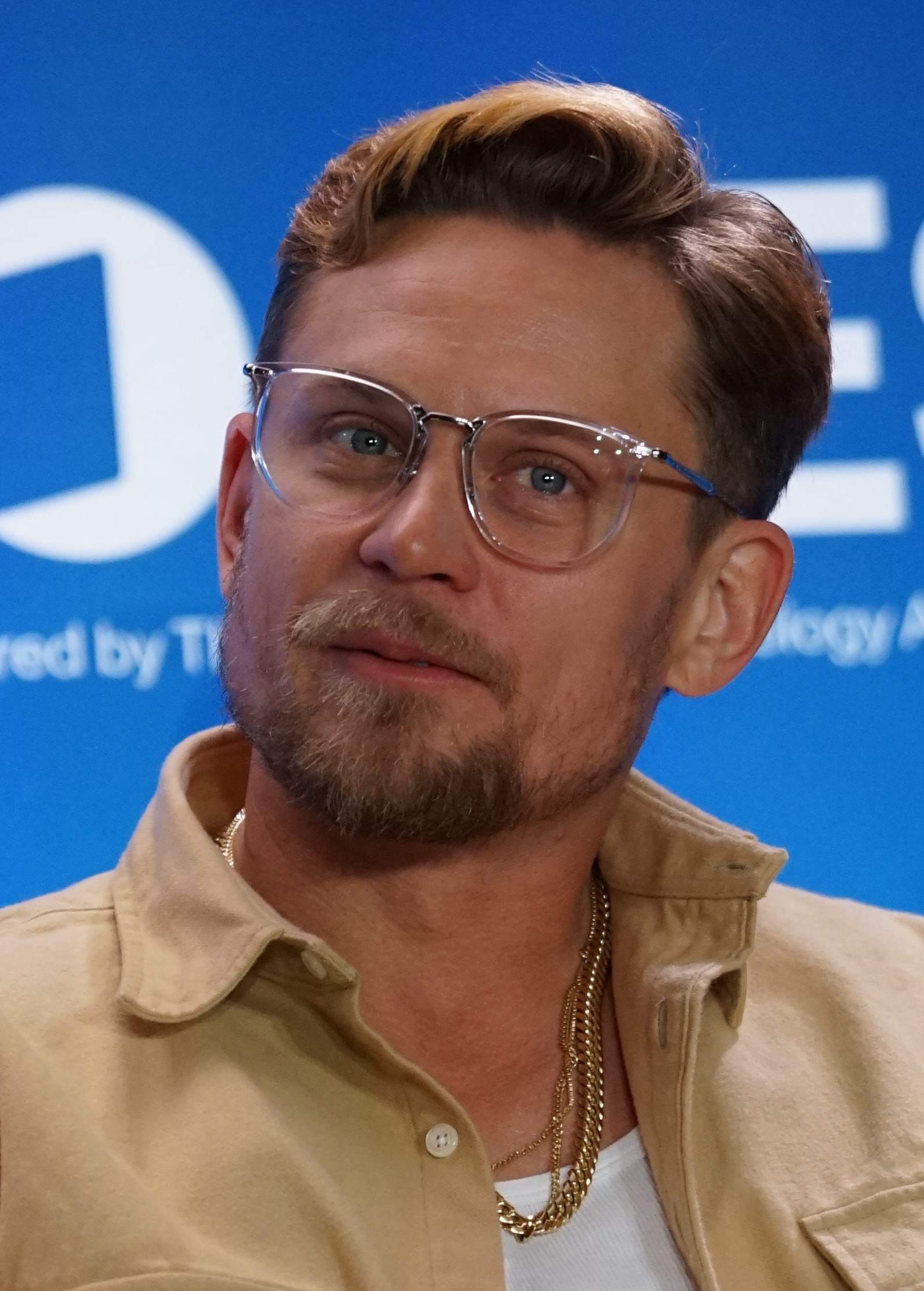
Billy Magnussen
(Pleakley)

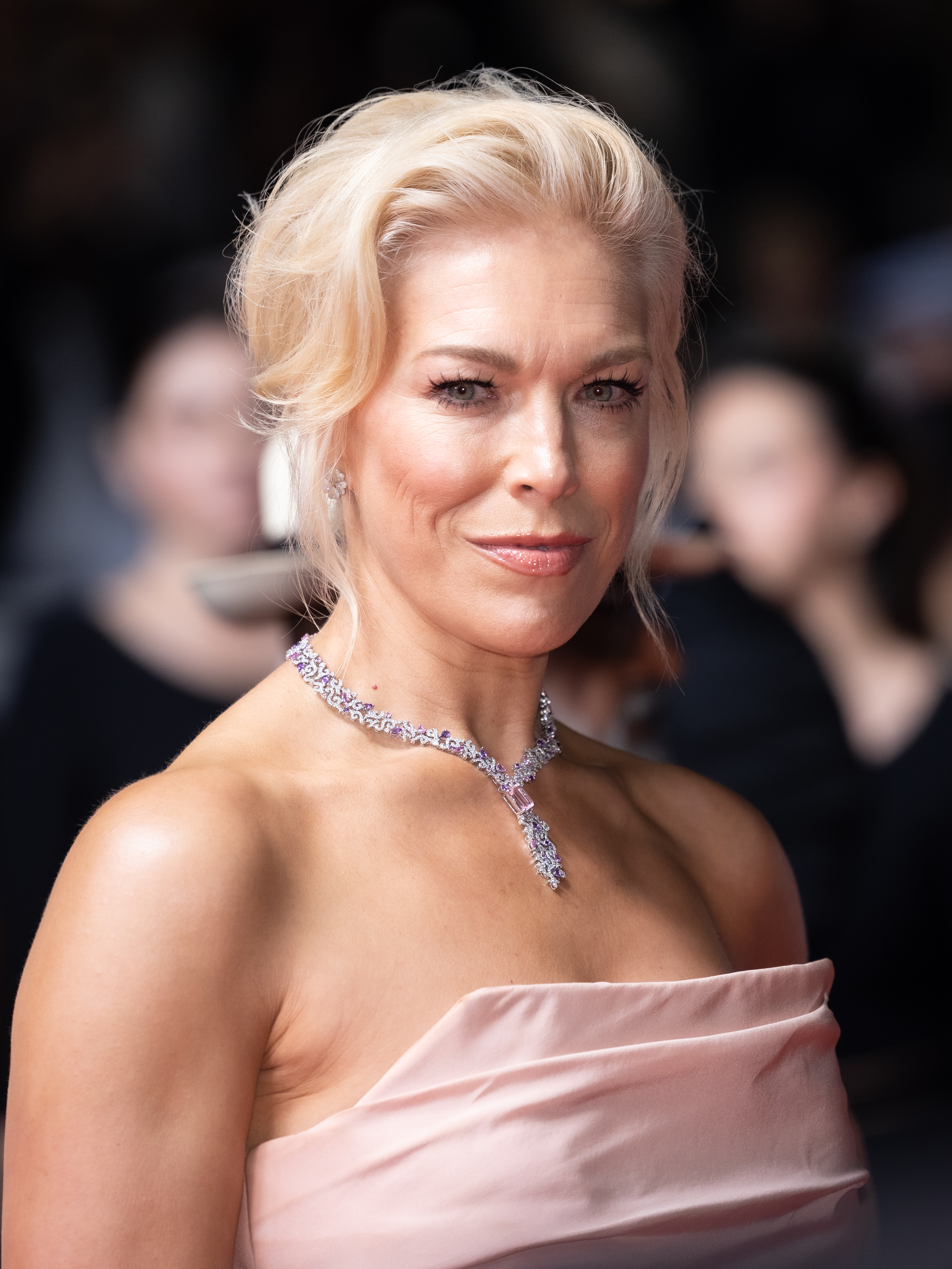
Hannah Waddingham
(Grand Councilwoman)

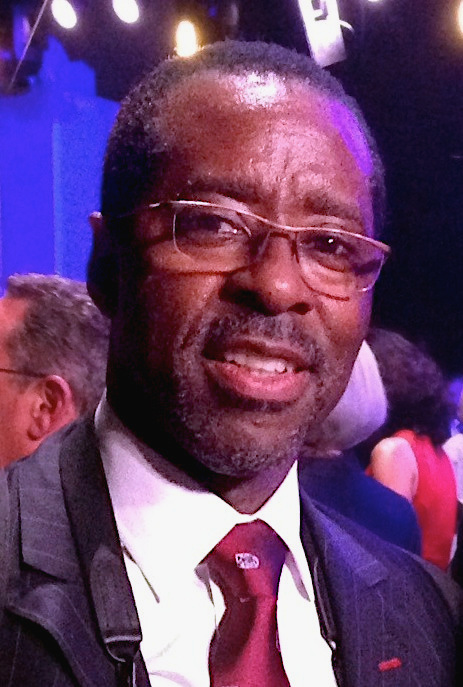
Courtney B. Vance
(Cobra Bubbles)

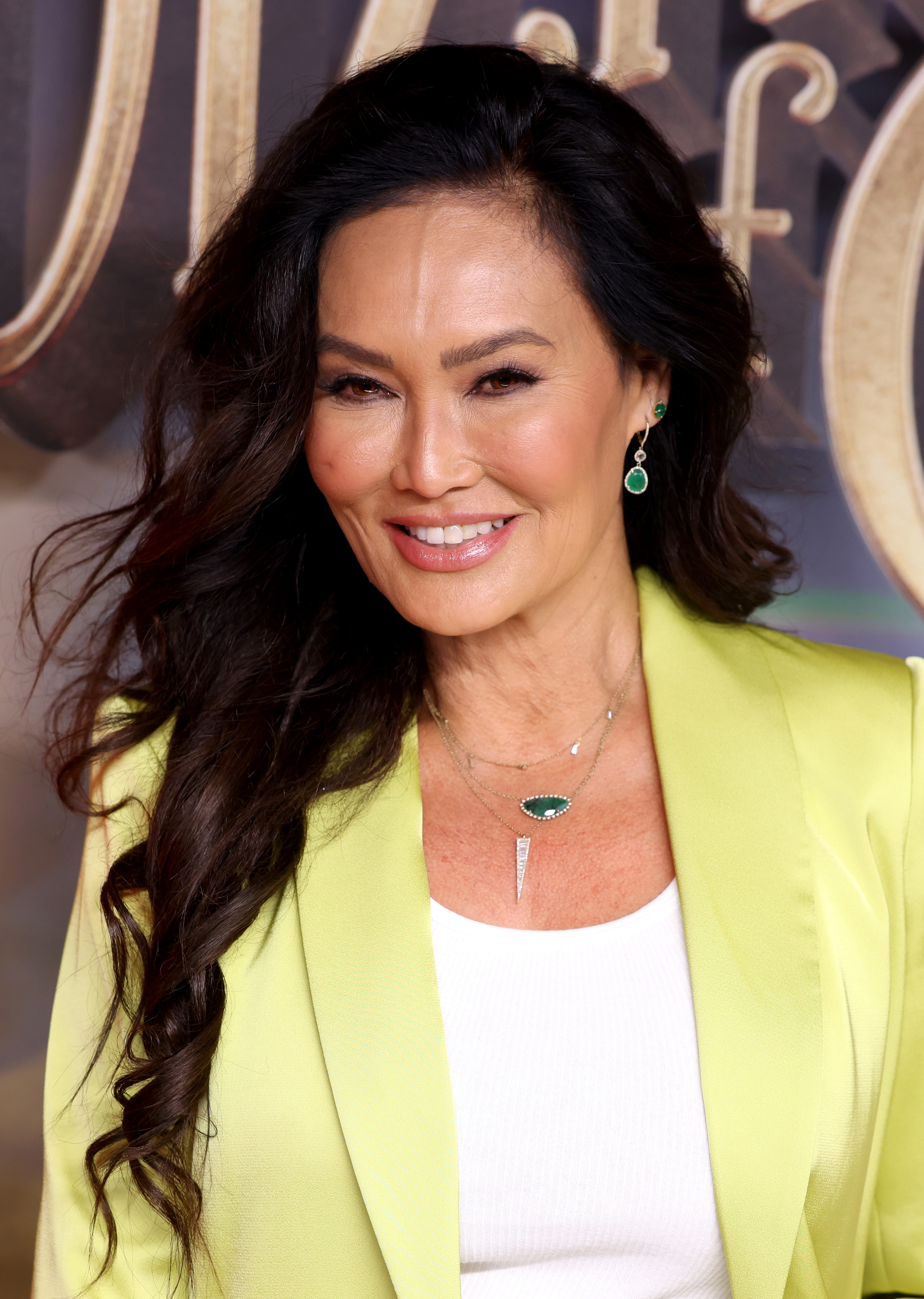
Tia Carrere
(Mrs. Kekoa)

Since the announcement of the film's development, it was speculated that the original film's co-writer/co-director, Chris Sanders, would reprise his role as the voice of Stitch in the remake. Sanders stated in a September 2022 interview that Disney had not yet approached him on reprising the role at the time, although he would be open to returning to voice his creation.

It was reported in November 2022 that a casting call had been issued for the film. The initial casting call was later tweeted on November 22 by the Coalition of Asian Pacifics in Entertainment.

In February 2023, Zach Galifianakis joined the cast in a then-unspecified role. While TheWrap reported at the time that he would voice Pleakley, The Hollywood Reporter wrote in April 2023 that Galifianakis had officially signed on to be voicing Dr. Jumba Jookiba. In late March, Maia Kealoha was cast in the lead role as Lilo Pelekai.

In April 2023, Billy Magnussen was cast as the voice of Agent Pleakley, and Sydney Agudong was cast as Nani Pelekai. Later that month, Kahiau Machado was cast as David Kawena, while Courtney B. Vance was cast as Cobra Bubbles, who fans initially believed was cut from the film's cast of characters. Tia Carrere and Amy Hill, who both voiced roles in the original film and its original sequel material such as Lilo & Stitch: The Series, were cast in new roles, with Sanders in final negotiations to reprise his voice role as Stitch. Sanders ultimately did five voice recording sessions late into production, with each session lasting about four hours. He explained in a February 2025 interview that his "Stitch voice" is difficult to maintain for such a long period each time. Vance revealed three months later near the film's release that he signed on to the role of Cobra Bubbles on behest of his children due to their fears of the aliens when they were younger.

The castings of Agudong and Machado were met with controversy on social media shortly after their announcements, with accusations of colorism and whitewashing towards Disney and the film's casting crew, as the two actors are of lighter skin tones than their characters' original animated counterparts. Sydney Agudong is a mixed-race woman born and raised on Kauaʻi (where the franchise is mainly set) to a Caucasian mother and a father who is Filipino and Hawaiian. Agudong received comments on her Instagram account attacking her for accepting the role. After Internet users discovered that Machado previously used a racial slur on his Spotify and Instagram accounts, Disney recast him with Kaipo Dudoit. Machado later posted an apology for his prior use of the slur via Instagram on April 27, 2023.

In June 2023, Jason Scott Lee, who voiced David Kawena in the original film and Lilo & Stitch 2: Stitch Has a Glitch (2005), revealed on the podcast Kyle Meredith With... that he will have a cameo in the film as the manager of the luau where Nani and David work.

In May 2025, it was revealed that the original film's main antagonist Gantu, the corrupt captain of the United Galactic Federation's armada, was cut from the film. Shortly after the film's release, Fleischer Camp and Eirich revealed to Entertainment Weekly that Gantu was in the original scripts of the film, but the former advocated for the character's removal and shifting the antagonist role to Jumba. Fleischer Camp believed that Gantu's arrival on Earth in the original film turned it into "a more conventional movie", while making Jumba the villain added a "personal connection" to the live-action film's story, as Fleischer Camp saw him as a "terrible delinquent father figure" for Stitch, saying, "You want your main antagonist to also be the representative of the theme of the film. It seemed like an opportunity to do that as opposed to just there's a big bad boss that comes down and is shooting lasers at everyone."

On June 12, 2025, almost three weeks after the film's release, David Hekili Kenui Bell, who played the "Big Hawaiian Dude", died at age 46. Lilo & Stitch was Bell's film debut; Bell previously played minor characters in the television series Hawaii Five-0 (2010–2020) and Magnum P.I. (2018–2024).

=== Filming ===
According to Fleischer Camp, the production team was "so dedicated" to shooting the entire film on location in Hawaii because "there's just not really a substitute for it". He vaguely alluded to "boring logistical reasons" for why the film could not be shot on location on the island of Kauai; instead, it was filmed on the island of Oahu.

Principal photography was originally slated to start on Oahu on March 13, 2023, and finish on June 16. However, the first day of filming was delayed until April 17.

On April 16, 2023, a fire broke out in a trailer within the base camp of the film's set in Haleiwa, causing approximately $200,000 in damage. The trailer contained costumes that would have been used for the first three weeks of filming. The fire started before 11 pm HST and was extinguished by 1 am the following day. There were no reported injuries, although the beginning of filming was delayed indefinitely. The Honolulu Police Department classified it as a first-degree arson and opened an investigation in response.

Filming eventually began by May 1, 2023, when a portion of the Kalanianaole Highway was closed for the film's production.

The Pelekai house was a temporary structure built at Kualoa Ranch in an area where some of the ranch managers live. A real luau, Germaine's, was rebranded as the fictional Jimmy's Luau in the film. The Kahala Hotel & Resort was used for the fictional Hoomaluhia Resort and Spa.

Filming was suspended in July due to the 2023 SAG-AFTRA strike. It eventually resumed in February 2024 and finally wrapped in early March that year.

=== Visual effects and design ===
The visual effects were provided by Disney-owned Industrial Light & Magic (ILM). Craig Hammack served as visual effects supervisor; according to Hammack, he first became involved in "serious discussions about the project in the fall of 2022". Additional visual effects were provided by Luma Pictures, Moving Picture Company (MPC), Untold Studios, Crafty Apes, Atomic Arts and Cantina Creative.

Early on, to ensure strong on-screen chemistry between the child actress playing Lilo (who had not yet been cast) and the computer-generated Stitch character, ILM decided to employ animatronic puppets as stand-ins for Stitch on set. ILM hired Legacy Effects to build several puppet versions of Stitch, including a version suitable for underwater scenes. The puppets never appear on screen in the finished film; they were created only to provide the cast members with a "physical scene partner" capable of eliciting appropriate emotional reactions. This method resulted in a lot of "messy plate cleanup" for the visual effects artists (in terms of carefully erasing the puppets from the raw footage). However, it was deemed to be worth the cost because of the risk of getting "stale" performances otherwise if the cast had been asked to react to an entirely imaginary Stitch. Legacy Effects sent puppeteer Seth Hayes to Hawaii to operate the puppets on set. For some scenes in which Lilo initially mistakes Stitch for a dog, a French Bulldog named Dale played Stitch. In post-production, the puppet and dog stand-ins for Stitch were replaced by ILM with a CGI Stitch.

There are 1,673 visual effects shots in the final cut of the film. Originally, ILM was planning to do the majority of the visual effects work itself, but then had to bring in additional vendors as the complexity of the project became clear. One reason for the large number of vendors is that MPC suddenly went into administration just six weeks before the deadline for delivering their work, and ILM had to scramble to find other companies who could finish MPC's shots on short notice.

The animators working on the 3D version of Stitch tried to capture the "essence" of the original 2D animated version and "make him fit convincingly" into the real world. The "biggest discrepancy" never explained in the film is that Stitch is supposed to be very heavy, yet Lilo is able to pick him up. The animators were trying to avoid a shot-for-shot remake, but did closely follow the look of certain shots in the original film for several iconic moments.

=== Soundtrack ===
On February 3, 2025, it was revealed that Dan Romer would score the film. The film's soundtrack features almost all of the songs from the original film. These include the Elvis Presley songs "(You're the) Devil in Disguise", "Hound Dog", "Heartbreak Hotel" and a new cover of "Burning Love" produced by Bruno Mars and performed by his nephews Nyjah Music and Zyah Rhythm. Mark Kealiʻi Hoʻomalu and The Kamehameha Schools Children's Chorus (including the latter's director, Lynell K. Bright, the mother of screenwriter Chris Kekaniokalani Bright) returned to record a new original song called "He Lei Pāpahi No Lilo a me Stitch".

American Idol Season 21 winner Iam Tongi and the Chorus also recorded a new version of "Hawaiian Roller Coaster Ride", which was released as a single on May 9, 2025, ahead of a live performance of their version on Season 23 of American Idol on May 12. Liliʻuokalani's "Aloha ʻOe," a song featured prominently throughout the animated continuity, returns for this film in a duet performed by Sydney Agudong and Maia Kealoha as Nani and Lilo respectively. The soundtrack album was released on May 21, 2025, by Walt Disney Records. A limited-edition picture disc 10″ vinyl single featuring three of the songs were released on May 23, 2025.

== Marketing ==
A first look at the film's live-action Stitch design was revealed at the 2024 D23 convention on August 9, 2024. Screen Rant and Collider both reacted positively to the reveal. On November 8, 2024, during D23 Brazil, Disney released a still from the film showing Stitch wearing a lei and looking at an out-of-focus Lilo while standing on her bed.

On November 22, Disney published the first teaser poster for the film, featuring an extreme close-up of Stitch. On November 25, Disney released the first teaser trailer, showing Stitch on a beach destroying a sandcastle modeled after the Cinderella Castle, as depicted in Disney's production logo. On November 27, the same day of the wide release of Moana 2 (which the first teaser was attached to in theaters), a new poster was shown featuring Stitch with a Kakamora from the Moana franchise in his mouth, alluding to the original film's crossover-based marketing campaign in which Stitch invaded other Disney films.

On December 18, two days before the release of Mufasa: The Lion King, another crossover poster and another teaser trailer were released (the latter attached to Mufasa), both showing Stitch being held up in the air in the same vein as the presentation of baby Simba in The Lion King (1994). The trailer shows him, wearing water wings, being held up by a pair of human arms until he struggles out of them to splash in shallow seawater. The accompanying poster has him being held up by Rafiki instead, as with The Lion King "Inter-Stitch-al" trailer for the original Lilo & Stitch film. A TV spot created exclusively to air during Super Bowl LIX was released on February 9, 2025, featuring Stitch seemingly "interrupting" the kickoff by running around Caesars Superdome like a football player. The spot received 173.1 million online views in 24 hours, making it Disney's most digitally viewed spot in the company's history.

The official trailer was released on March 12, 2025, Lilo & Stitch creator Chris Sanders' 63rd birthday, showing several of the characters other than Stitch for the first time. The trailer's release caused Lilo & Stitch to be the #1 trending topic on X (Twitter), YouTube, and Douyin (the Chinese version of TikTok), reaching No. 1 on the former platform within an hour of release. On March 14, Disney announced that the trailer became the company's second-most viewed live-action film trailer within 24 hours with 158 million views within that time, only behind the teaser trailer for The Lion King (2019) which received 224.6 million views within such time frame. (Note: Although Disney considers The Lion King (2019) to be "live-action" and part of their series of live-action remakes and adaptations of their animated films, that film is, save for its opening shot, a photorealistic computer animated film. If that film is excluded due to such technicality, then the Lilo & Stitch trailer would be the most viewed trailer for a live-action Disney film.)

On March 19, several posters inspired by past remakes of Disney films, including Snow White (2025), Cinderella (2015), Beauty and the Beast (2017), and Aladdin (2019), featured Stitch messing with important objects from each one of the films. On April 3, during CinemaCon's Disney panel, a new poster was revealed featuring Stitch having wreaked havoc on elements from Disney and the company's major film studios, such as Marvel Studios, 20th Century Studios, Pixar Animation Studios and Lucasfilm.

Further promotions for the film as it neared release included Stitch animatronic figures that showed up at various locations including movie theaters, shopping malls and Elvis Presley's Graceland in Memphis, Tennessee. These figures included ones that popped out from popcorn buckets and ones that "drove" a pink Power Wheels-style toy car similar to the one he takes from Mertle Edmonds in the film. According to The New York Times, the film had a marketing budget of at least $75 million. ILM also created a real-time animation model of Stitch, using their own model made for the film; this model was used for press junkets, Instagram and TikTok livestreams, and digital interactions with fans at the film's premiere, similar to the digital puppet animation of Stitch in the interactive theme park attraction Stitch Encounter.

=== Merchandise ===
As with most previous Disney properties, Just Play handles the master global toy license with its Stitch toyline including several products inspired by the film alongside products from other licenses and The Disney Store.

== Release ==
=== Theatrical ===
In November 2020, Variety and The Hollywood Reporter reported that Disney had not determined whether the film would be released theatrically or through Disney+. In November 2022, it was confirmed via a casting call that the film was to be produced for a direct-to-streaming Disney+ release. In August 2024, the film was shifted to a summer 2025 theatrical release. In October, the film was given a release date of May 23, 2025. The release also included engagements in RealD 3D, Dolby Cinema and 4DX. AMC Theatres had a special Lilo & Stitch Opening Night Fan Event in Dolby Cinema, Regal Cinemas had a special Lilo & Stitch Fan Event in 4DX, and Cinemark Theatres had a Lilo & Stitch Fan Event Super Ticket Package in RealD 3D that took place on May 22 at 6:26 pm, referencing Stitch's experiment number/other name of Experiment 626. The film held its world premiere at the El Capitan Theatre in Los Angeles, the same venue that hosted the premiere of the original film, on May 17, 2025. The film was rated PG by the MPA, making it the first Disney live-action remake to share the same rating as the original film.

=== Home media ===
Lilo & Stitch was released for digital download on July 22, 2025, and on Ultra HD Blu-ray, Blu-ray, and DVD on August 26. The home media releases include deleted scenes, a gag reel, director's commentary, and featurettes. The film was released on Disney+ on September 3.

In the United Kingdom, Lilo & Stitch debuted at No. 1 on the Official Film Chart, the weekly home entertainment sales chart, for the week ending July 30. The film ranked fifth for the week ending September 10, after placing fourth the previous week. In the United States, Lilo & Stitch debuted at No. 1 on the Circana VideoScan combined DVD and Blu-ray sales chart, as well as the dedicated Blu-ray sales chart, for the week ended August 30. High-definition formats accounted for 54% of its first-week sales, with 44% from regular Blu-ray and 10% from 4K Ultra HD editions. The film remained at No. 1 on both the combined DVD and Blu-ray sales chart and the dedicated Blu-ray chart for the week ending September 6.

Lilo & Stitch was viewed 14.3 million times in the five days following its release on Disney+, ranking as the platform's second most-streamed live-action Disney film premiere after The Little Mermaid (2023). Nielsen Media Research, which records streaming viewership on certain U.S. television screens, reported that it was streamed for 803 million minutes from September 1–7, ranking as the third most-streamed film of the week. During the following week, from September 8–14, it remained the third most-streamed film, with a total of 399 million minutes of viewing time. Between September 15–21, Lilo & Stitch was streamed for 270 million minutes, ranking as the sixth most-streamed film of the week. The following week, from September 22–28, it was the ninth most-streamed film, with 157 million minutes of watch time.

== Reception ==
=== Box office ===
During its initial theatrical run, Lilo & Stitch grossed $423.8 million in the United States and Canada, and $614.2 million in other territories, for a worldwide total of $1.038 billion.

After tickets went on sale, Fandango Media reported that Lilo & Stitch became the best first-day ticket pre-sale of the year for a PG-rated title, surpassing A Minecraft Movie, Snow White, Dog Man and the US release of Paddington in Peru. It also became the second-most first-day ticket pre-seller for a Disney remake, behind The Lion King. The film was released alongside Mission: Impossible – The Final Reckoning and was initially tracking to gross $165 million domestically over the four-day Memorial Day weekend. After making $55 million on its first day (including $14.5 million from Thursday night previews), projections were increased to $175–180 million. On May 25, it was reported that the film was now expected to make $183 million over the four-day weekend, breaking Top Gun: Maverick's record ($160 million) for earning the Memorial Day weekend debut. The film would go on to make $146 million over the traditional three-day weekend and $182.6 million over the four-day Memorial Day weekend, setting a record. In its second weekend, the film made $61.8 million (a 58% drop), remaining in first; additionally, it surpassed the gross of its predecessor ($273.1 million). Lilo & Stitch remained at the top of the box office in its third weekend with $32.4 million. It made $15.5 million in its fourth weekend, finally being dethroned by newcomer How to Train Your Dragon, another live-action animated remake of a film originally written and directed by Chris Sanders and Dean DeBlois (the latter also wrote and directed the How to Train Your Dragon remake). Lilo & Stitch ended its box office run as the third highest-grossing film of 2025 in the U.S. and Canada behind Zootopia 2 and A Minecraft Movie.

On July 17, 2025, Lilo & Stitch crossed the $1 billion threshold, becoming the first Hollywood film of 2025 and second overall film released that year (after the Chinese animated film Ne Zha 2) to do so. It became the first adaptation of a Disney animated film to surpass that threshold since The Lion King in 2019, and surpassed The Smurfs ($563 million in 2011) to become the highest-grossing live-action/animated film of all time.

=== Critical response ===
The film received mixed-to-positive reviews from critics. On the review aggregator website Rotten Tomatoes, 72% of 218 critics' reviews are positive, with an average rating of 6.2/10. The website's consensus reads: "Recapturing the adorable charm of the original if not quite matching its rambunctious sense of imagination, Lilo & Stitch emerges out of the crate as one of the better live-action remakes of a Disney classic." Metacritic, which uses a weighted average, assigned the film a score of 53 out of 100, based on 40 critics, indicating "mixed or average" reviews. Audiences polled by CinemaScore gave the film an average grade of "A" on an A+ to F scale, the same as the animated film, while those surveyed by PostTrak gave it a 90% overall positive score, with 81% saying they would definitely recommend the film.

Several changes made to the remake were criticized, including the removal of Pleakley's drag disguise, Gantu's absence, the characterization of Jumba, and the decision to have Nani surrender her guardianship of Lilo.

Brandon Yu of The New York Times gave the film a positive review and said, "It's a moderately fun, mostly serviceable and often adorable revamp." Nell Minow of RogerEbert.com gave the film three stars out of four and said, "Children new to the story will enjoy some gross-out humor, slapstick naughtiness, and the reassuring theme that families of all kinds, including those we choose, can be devoted to the idea of ohana."

Helen O'Hara of Empire gave the film three stars out of five and said, "Fleischer Camp brings a light touch and a good human cast to this reverently faithful effort, but it's never as clear and bright as its source material." Eric Goldman of IGN gave the film a score of 8 out of 10 and said, "Ohana means family, and family means one of the better Disney live-action remakes."

Jesse Hassenger of The Guardian gave the film one star out of five and saying, "director Dean Fleischer Camp (Marcel the Shell with Shoes) doesn't give either the poor humans or special-effects characters any kind of visible technical support in their impossible task." Bilge Ebiri of the Vulture gave the film a negative review, saying, "It reminds us that Lilo & Stitch's form and its essence were one and the same. This remake doesn't feel like its own movie, but rather a doomed attempt to reengineer a miracle."

=== Accolades ===
The film was nominated in the category of Outstanding Character in a Photoreal Feature for the character of "Stitch" at the 24th Visual Effects Society Awards. It was also nominated for Best Movie for Children at the 2026 Movieguide Awards. Lilo & Stitch also received a nomination for Best Children's & Family Film at the 79th British Academy Film Awards. At the 53rd Saturn Awards, Lilo & Stitich was nominated for Best Fantasy Film and Kealoha received a nomination for Best Younger Performer in a Film. The film has been nominated Favorite Movie at the 2026 Kids' Choice Awards while Zach Galifianakis has been nominated for Favorite Actor and Favorite Villain.

== Sequel ==
In an interview ahead of the film's release, director Fleischer Camp and producer Eirich said they were focused on the release of the current film and had not discussed concrete plans for a sequel. Fleischer Camp echoed Eirich's sentiment that any future direction would depend on audience reception, noting the franchise's expansive world as a source of potential inspiration, with Eirich pointing out Easter eggs in the film referencing Angel, Reuben and 627 (whom he erroneously referred to as Leroy). In June 2025, Fleischer Camp said he would do a sequel if it was the right idea, not just because there is a new market demand for it, but he also would be open to doing an animated spin-off as an episodic or limited series. Later that month on June 26 (known as "626 Day" or "Stitch Day"), it was announced that a sequel was in development. Sanders was set to join as a screenwriter, making it his first involvement in the franchise since the original film beyond providing the voice of Stitch. Eirich would also return as producer for the sequel. The film, Lilo & Stitch 2, is scheduled for release on May 26, 2028. In June 2026, it was announced that Sanders would also be directing the sequel film.

At the Disney Entertainment Showcase during D23: The Ultimate Disney Fan Event 2026, it was revealed that Angel will be appearing in the film.

== See also ==
- List of remakes and adaptations of Disney animated films
