= Stitch (Lilo & Stitch) =

Fictional Lilo & Stitch character

- Lilo & Stitch character
- Stitch in his disguised "Earth dog" form (lower arms, antennae and spines retracted), the most frequently seen form of the character
- First appearance: Lilo & Stitch (2002)
- Created by: Chris Sanders (Note: Sanders created Stitch independently from anyone else years before Lilo & Stitch was conceived, although he personally considers his directing and writing partner for the film Dean DeBlois to be the character's co-creator.)
- Designed by: Chris Sanders
- Voiced by: Chris Sanders (2002–present); Michael Yingling (additional lines in Lilo & Stitch: The Series, toys, and interactive games); Ben Diskin (Stitch! and Stitch & Ai)

In-universe information
- Alias: Experiment 626 (birth name)
- Nicknames: Little Monster (by Pleakley); Boojiboo (by Angel); Abomination (by Gantu); Crazy/Little Trog (by Gantu)
- Species: Experiment (artificially-created koala-like extraterrestrial)
- Gender: Male
- Occupation: Pet "dog"; Captain of the Galactic Armada (Leroy & Stitch and part-time in Stitch!)
- Family: Jumba Jookiba (creator); Lilo Pelekai (owner); Nani Pelekai (caretaker); Wendy Pleakley (friend); Experiment 625 / Reuben ("cousin"); Other experiment "cousins"; Experiment 629 / Leroy (twin brother); Yuna Kamihara (best friend; Stitch! only); Wang Ai Ling (best friend; Stitch & Ai only)
- Significant other: Experiment 624 / Angel
- Abilities: Several: Superhuman strength, speed, agility, and durability; Hypercognition; Skilled hand-to-hand combat with four arms; Ability to climb walls and ceilings; Retractable claws, antennae, spines and lower pair of arms; Highly flexible skeleton and body; Super-sensitive hearing and sense of smell; Night vision, X-ray vision, and thermal vision

Stitch, also known as Experiment 626 (pronounced "six-two-six"), is a fictional character from Disney's Lilo & Stitch franchise. A genetically engineered extraterrestrial life-form, he is the more prominent of the franchise's two title protagonists, the other being his human adopter and best friend Lilo Pelekai. Stitch has gained a strong merchandise presence and is one of Disney's most popular modern characters.

Stitch was created by Lilo & Stitch co-writer and co-director Chris Sanders, who also voices him in almost all media that he appears in, primarily in Western-produced works. Ben Diskin voices the character in the English versions of the Asian-produced television spin-offs Stitch! and Stitch & Ai.

== Development ==
The earliest known concept artwork of Stitch by Chris Sanders, drawn in 1981

Sanders originally created the character in 1981 for a children's book pitch which never came to light and developed a treatment for an animated feature starring the character. The idea for the character was shelved until around 1996 when then-President of Walt Disney Feature Animation, Thomas Schumacher, approached Sanders and asked him if he wanted to pitch a story, giving Sanders the opportunity to use his character again. When Sanders said that the alien character was going to crash-land in a forest filled with other animals, Schumacher told Sanders that the animal world was already "overly alien" to humans, and suggested that the character should end up in the human world to provide better contrast and juxtaposition for the story. Sanders felt that Stitch was a male character that required a female counterpart in the form of a little girl to balance his bad behavior and create conflict in the story.

In later development for the film's fictional story, the character was going to be the leader of an intergalactic gang of criminals, with Jumba being one of his former cronies summoned by the Intergalactic Council to capture him. Test audience responses to early versions of the film resulted in the change of Stitch and Jumba's relationship to that of creation and creator, respectively.

The character was originally meant to be incapable of speaking intelligibly. However, when the Lilo & Stitch production team realized that the film's story "hinged" on the character being able to explain himself at the end of the film, Sanders provided vocals for Stitch during early animation, using a distinct, high-pitched, nasal voice that he previously used to annoy his co-workers. At the suggestion of co-writer and co-director Dean DeBlois—who Sanders personally attributes being co-creator of the Stitch character—out of shared concerns that Disney executives would demand Stitch to speak more than he needed to if they were to hire a professional voice actor, Sanders established himself as the official voice of the fictional character Stitch after the production team got used to his vocalizations. Sanders later revealed in a 2022 interview for Lilo & Stitch's 20th anniversary that Stitch's voice was consistently the lowest-rated aspect of the film, according to cards that were filled by audiences at test screenings.

== Characteristics ==
=== Design ===
Stitch is a short, blue-furred, genetically engineered, extraterrestrial lifeform, with a koala-like body shape. He has large bulging eyes, long notched ears, sharp teeth, a pair of retractable antennae, razor sharp claws, and two pairs of arms (the lower pair of which are retractable).

Sanders's initial design concepts for Stitch differed heavily from the final version. His eyes were slightly smaller, his ears flared at the base, and in some drawings his nose was placed below the eye line instead of above. Stitch was originally intended to have green fur. This was changed to blue during the development of the animated film due to the head of the paint and ink department considering it to be a more believable color for a dog. Although Stitch is similar in physical form to a French bulldog or a koala, Sanders said that he was thinking of a bat.

=== Personality ===
Stitch is created by Jumba Jookiba to cause chaos across the galaxy. Stitch is marked by his mischievous behavior, which endeared him to Lilo, who adopts him as her "dog". Through Lilo's beliefs in the Hawaiian concept of ʻohana, meaning 'family', Stitch evolves from an uncaring, destructive creature to a loving, more self-conscious being who enjoys the company of his adoptive family on Earth. He becomes a firm believer of the ʻohana concept, and with the help of Lilo applies it to reform Jumba's 625 prior experiments, nearly all of whom Stitch treats as his "cousins".

=== Powers and abilities ===
Stitch possesses immense strength, durability, and intelligence, with Jumba claiming that he can think faster than a supercomputer. His eyes can pick up various forms of light and he can filter out one or the other if necessary. Stitch can see in normal vision (during this mode, his eyes appear pure black), night vision (green), thermal vision (red), and X-ray (green). However, his high sensitivity to light also causes flash lights to be very painful to him.

Like his "cousins", the pads on Stitch's hands and feet can secrete a sticky substance allowing him to adhere to almost any surface and scale buildings and walls; and his skeletal system is very flexible, allowing him to roll into a ball-like form and squeeze through tight spaces.

Stitch can also conduct sound, acting as an audio amplifier, radio, or microphone. He has an acute sense of smell and hearing (though the latter can lead to temporary deafness when exposed to sonic blasts) and is also dexterously skilled in hand-to-hand combat, using all four arms or just two.

Stitch is unable to float or swim due to his dense molecular structure, which causes him to sink in water. Stitch originally also had an instinctive aquaphobia, but was able to overcome it with Lilo's help. Since Stitch's molecules were not fully charged upon creation as shown in Lilo & Stitch 2: Stitch Has a Glitch, if his initial charging was not finished he would later suffer seizure-like glitches that would revert him to his original destructive programming before dying. This issue was resolved by the film's end, and he no longer suffers these glitches.

Stitch also has different abilities in the Asian-produced spin-off shows Stitch! and Stitch & Ai that were not previously revealed in the Western-produced continuity. In Stitch! ~Best Friends Forever~, the anime's third season, he has a hidden power cell that charges his powers to greater levels. In Stitch & Ai, he has new abilities that also change his appearance in some form, including extendable quills around his neck, extendable patagium that enable him to glide and a "metamorphosis program" that activates when his destructive programming is fully triggered. The metamorphosis program causes Stitch to grow into a giant form with back-mounted laser-firing tentacles, although this ability contradicts Lilo & Stitch: The Series establishing that he is only made to perform efficiently at his typical small size, as he was shown in The Series to be clumsier as a giant.

== Appearances ==
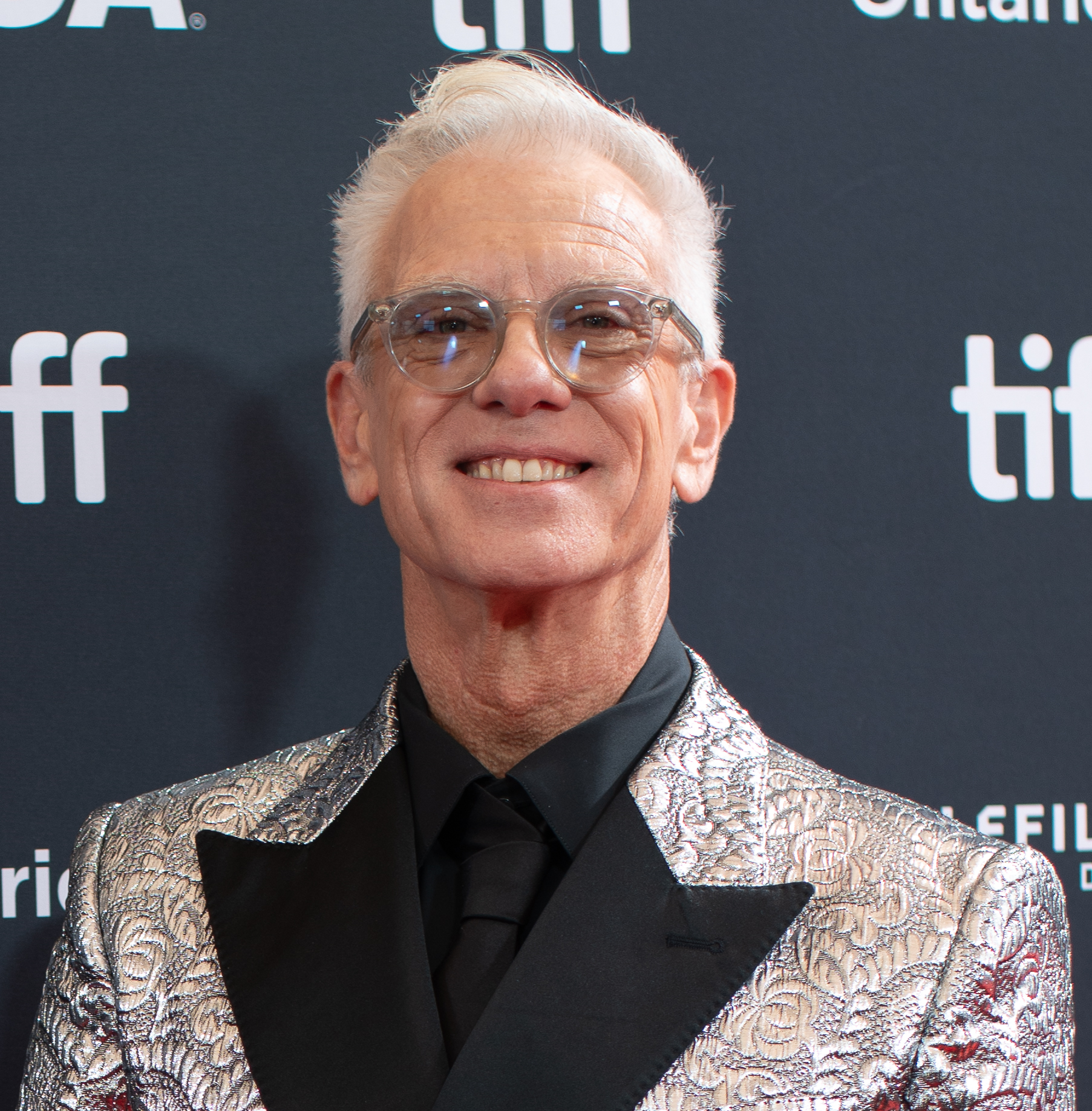
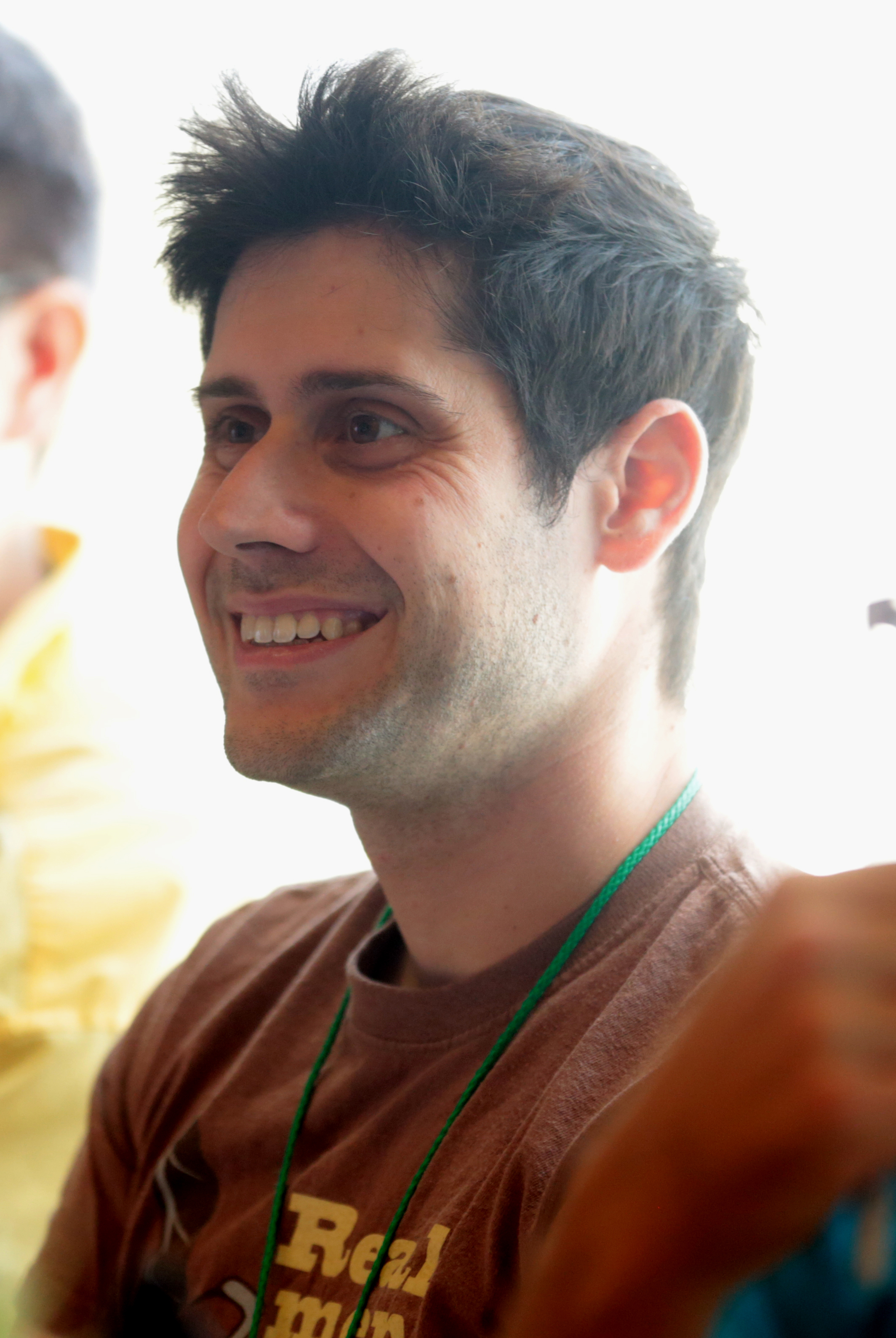
Chris Sanders (left), the creator of Stitch, also provides Stitch's voice in almost all media except for Stitch! and Stitch & Ai, in which Ben Diskin (right) replaced him for the voice role.

=== Lilo & Stitch (2002) ===
"Experiment 626" was created by "evil genius" Dr. Jumba Jookiba to cause and create chaos around the galaxy. They were both captured and put on trial by the United Galactic Federation, who sentenced 626 to exile on a desert asteroid. The Grand Councilwoman assigns Captain Gantu to escort him. 626 escapes, crash-landing a spaceship on Earth in Kauaʻi, Hawaii. Disguising himself as a dog to hide from his captors, 626 is adopted by a little girl named Lilo, who names him "Stitch".

Lilo tries to teach Stitch to be good, using Elvis Presley as a model for his behavior. While these efforts prove to be fruitless at first, with Stitch unable to suppress his destructive programming, Lilo enjoys having Stitch as her "puppy", although he at first only wanted to use Lilo as a human shield from Jumba and Agent Pleakley. Jumba and Pleakley were sent to capture him by the Grand Councilwoman. Stitch slowly develops a strong love for Lilo, to the point where he saves her from Gantu, who is the antagonist of the film. After his heroics, the Grand Councilwoman allows Stitch to serve his exile on Earth with Lilo as his warden, citing her dog adoption certificate (subsequently, Lilo seems to have become not only a best friend but also a sister figure to Stitch).

=== Lilo & Stitch 2: Stitch Has a Glitch (2005) ===
In this sequel film, set between the first film and Stitch! The Movie, Stitch is living well, reasonably well-behaved (although still hot-tempered and mischievous) with the exiled Jumba and Pleakley in Lilo's (and her older sister Nani's) house, until he begins malfunctioning. Jumba reveals that since Stitch was not fully charged after his creation, he will experience periodic glitches that revert to his original destructive programming, appearing to suffer from a "fit" or "seizure". Seeing this, Jumba creates a new charging chamber for Stitch. Not wanting to hurt anyone, Stitch attempts to leave Earth for a remote planet, while Lilo, Jumba and the others desperately try to have him return so his life can be saved. Although they are too late when they place him in the recharging pod, Stitch seems to be revived by Lilo's love (similar to the story of Hiʻiaka and Lohiʻau as told in the movie), which goes in accordance with her belief that love is more powerful than death.

=== Stitch! The Movie (2003) ===
After the events of Lilo & Stitch 2, Stitch begins to feel lonely as his "freaky" appearance and behavior drives away other people outside of his ʻohana. After Jumba gets kidnapped by Gantu, Stitch discovers the remaining 625 genetic experiments (actually 624; the 625th was also taken by Gantu during the kidnapping) stored in a special container, in the form of dehydrated pods. He and Lilo then activate Experiment 221 (who the latter names "Sparky" later on), who then runs amok on Kauaʻi for several hours until the duo catches him. Stitch then bonds with Sparky and begins to view him as a "cousin", adopting a Hawaiian slang usage of the word that he learned from Lilo. In order to rescue Jumba, a trade between Jacques von Hämsterviel and Jumba for the experiments are organized, but due to Lilo and Stitch's deciding not to hand over Sparky, it instead results in the experiments' pods being scattered across Hawaii and the duo being captured and held aboard Hämsterviel's spacecraft. Hämsterviel then tries to clone Stitch, but Sparky rescues him. Stitch then rescues Lilo and lands Hämsterviel's spacecraft back on Kauaʻi, where the Grand Councilwoman arrests him. After the Grand Councilwoman suggests evacuating Earth due to the danger Jumba's freed experiments pose, Lilo and Stitch convince her to instead have them hunt down the experiments and give them a place where they can belong, thus beginning the events of Lilo & Stitch: The Series.

=== Lilo & Stitch: The Series (2003–2006) ===
After the events of Stitch! The Movie, Stitch and Lilo have to capture Jumba's other experiments and find them a home. Along the way, he meets his match: Experiment 627 who is tougher than him, but he eventually defeats with his greater intelligence. He also meets Angel who is introduced as a love interest for Stitch, who becomes good out of love for Stitch.

=== Leroy & Stitch (2006) ===
After successfully capturing all the remaining experiments in the preceding series, the Grand Councilwoman offers Stitch the chance to become the captain of the Galactic Armada and their new flagship, the BRB (Big Red Battleship) 9000. However, that would require Stitch to be separated from Lilo. Not wanting to make Lilo sad, he chooses to return to Kaua'i, but Lilo tells him he should go. Before he leaves with Jumba and Pleakley, Lilo gives him a necklace with the god Ku Tiki on it to give him strength. When Gantu breaks out Dr. Hämsterviel in an action of frustration, Stitch is sent on his first mission to capture the evil rodent once more. But when he arrives at Galactic Defense Industries, Stitch faces off against Leroy, an enhanced clone of Stitch. Stitch fights well and is about to beat Leroy when Pleakley shows up unexpectedly, allowing Leroy to take advantage of Stitch's lapse in concentration and beat him. He is placed in a cage and sent with Jumba and Pleakley heading towards a black hole, and Leroy heads off towards Earth to capture all of the other experiments for Hämsterviel. Later, Stitch, Jumba, and Pleakley escape from the black hole and arrive on the planet Turo. There they rescue Lilo, 625 (now known as Reuben), and Gantu, and fly Pleakley's carpool van back to Earth to assist the other experiments in the defeat of an army of Leroys. With Leroy defeated, Stitch, Jumba, and Pleakley return to Earth with Lilo.

=== Stitch! (2008–2011, 2012, 2015) ===
In the anime series Stitch!, which chronologically take place years after the events of Leroy & Stitch, Stitch seems to have reverted to his destructive nature and is first seen in the first episode being chased in a spaceship by Jumba and the authorities, ending up on Izayoi Island, a fictitious island in Japan's Ryukyu Islands. On the island, Stitch gains a new human friend named Yuna Kamihara.

In the first two seasons, produced by Madhouse, Stitch learns from Yuna and her grandmother about the Chitama Spiritual Stone, a large magical stone in the island's Chitama Forest that can grant the wish of anyone who performs 43 good deeds. Stitch desires to become "ruler of the universe" and sets out to have his wish granted. After they are joined by Jumba and Pleakley, the former creates a bracelet-like device called a "good deed counter" for Stitch to keep track of his good deeds as determined by the Spiritual Stone, with good deeds adding points on the counter and bad deeds subtracting points. Stitch and Yuna also meet and befriend various yōkai living on the island, including a red-haired yōkai named Kijimunaa. Stitch also reunites with many of his fellow experiments, especially his girlfriend Angel, and fights off against Hämsterviel, Gantu, and his "cousin" Reuben again. At the end of the anime's second season, ~The Mischievous Alien's Great Adventure~, he acquires the necessary 43 deeds when he saves the galaxy from a rogue experiment's doomsday device, but he chooses to live with Yuna forever instead of being the ruler of the universe.

In the Shin-Ei Animation-produced third season, ~Best Friends Forever~, Stitch moves with Yuna, her cousin Tigerlily Sakai (who joined during the second season), Jumba, and Pleakley to an Okinawan city called New Town. As they go through life in the city, Stitch still finds himself fighting off Hämsterviel, who is now serving an alien woman named Delia who desires a power cell within Stitch called (in the original Japanese version) the "Neo-PowerChip" to make her own genetic experiment with, along with Gantu, Reuben, and several of Stitch's "cousins" who have now been "transmutated" by Hämsterviel. At the end of the season, Stitch and his allies fight against Delia's new experiment, Dark End. Stitch almost gets killed by Dark End until his Neo-PowerChip activates from the love he's given by his friends and family, supercharging him and allowing him to defeat Dark End. Two more TV specials set after the third season, Stitch and the Planet of Sand and Stitch! Perfect Memory, has Stitch go on intergalactic adventures with Pleakley, eventually facing and defeating new threats from Hämsterviel.

The original version (aired in Japan) initially left out what happened between Lilo and Stitch that caused them to be separated, although the anime's heavily edited international version, which includes the English dub, had Jumba imply that Stitch ran away out of jealousy of Lilo having a boyfriend. Lilo herself did not appear in the anime until episode 23 of season three, where she, now a fully-grown woman, visits New Town. She is joined by her daughter, Ani, who looks incredibly like her when she was a child and whom Stitch thought was Lilo in the beginning. Lilo and Stitch eventually reunite at the airport and reconcile, with Lilo explaining what happened on the day Stitch left her. She hugs him, gives him back his tiki necklace (originally given to him in Leroy & Stitch), promises to visit him again, and asks him to take good care of his new family before leaving to return to Hawaii.

=== Stitch & Ai (2017) ===
In the Chinese animated series Stitch & Ai, which takes place on a timeline set after Leroy & Stitch, Stitch was kidnapped from Lilo by an alien faction called the Jaboodies, who hold him captive in their battle cruiser spaceship as they desire to forcibly use him to win a space war against a rival faction called the Woolagongs, who also want to use Stitch to win the space war. When the Woolagongs attack the Jaboodies' battle cruiser wanting Stitch for themselves, he uses the opportunity to escape back to Earth, jumping from the spacecraft and re-entering Earth's atmosphere. He is protected during re-entry by—as explained in the cold open of the sixth episode "The Lock"—"special qi energy" that also caused him to lose much of his memories, including his memory of Lilo (who only appears in recreated flashbacks in this series). He ends up in the Huangshan mountains and meets a young Chinese girl who lives there named Wang Ai Ling, who (similarly to Lilo) takes him into her family as her new pet "dog". He helps Ai in preventing her aunt Daiyu from forcibly moving her from the mountains to the city, while she (and later Jumba and Pleakley) help protect him from being taken by either the Jaboodies or the Woolagongs, as well as look for a shrine that he saw in a vision he had. It is later explained that Stitch has a secret "metamorphosis program" embedded in him that turns him into a giant monstrosity, and the Jaboodies and the Woolagongs both separately desire Stitch to use this ability to take control of him. This ability eventually triggers in the middle of the two-part finale, "Brothers" and "Monstrosity", when Stitch is manipulated by an alien creature, nicknamed "Scratch" by Ai, who was sent by the Jaboodies and disguised himself as a new "brother" for Stitch to manipulate him into triggering the ability. Stitch causes destruction to a city under construction and almost joins the Jaboodies' army. However, Ai gets through to the real Stitch, who then attacks the army, rescues Ai from the Jaboodies, and returns to his normal size and appearance. The two are then joined in fighting the Jaboodies by Jumba, Pleakley, and various Chinese mythological creatures that Jumba created as experiments throughout the series, leading the warring aliens to retreat. The series ends with Stitch not having found his shrine, but nonetheless grateful to have a family.

=== Lilo & Stitch (2025) ===
As with the original 2002 animated film, the 2025 live-action/computer animated remake sees Experiment 626 escape to Earth, where he crash-lands on Kauaʻi and gets adopted by Lilo as "Stitch".

== In other media ==
=== Kingdom Hearts series ===
Stitch appears as a character summon in the Kingdom Hearts series. He is introduced in Kingdom Hearts II (2005), where he encounters Sora at Hollow Bastion and aids him as a Summon. Stitch makes subsequent appearances in Kingdom Hearts Birth by Sleep (2010), where he encounters Ventus and Aqua in Deep Space, and Kingdom Hearts III (2019), where he appears as an ally to Sora who he can summon in combat.

=== Disney Infinity ===
Stitch was included in the Toy Box Starter Pack (alongside Brave's Merida) for Disney Infinity: 2.0 Edition.

=== Disney Twisted-Wonderland ===
Stitch appears in a side event tiled “Stitch's Tropical Turbulence”, in which the characters from Disney Twisted-Wonderland are transported to a deserted island through a magic book. As the characters try to find a way to escape the island, they discover Stitch after his ship crashed on the island. When Gantu arrives to apprehend Stitch, they fight Gantu to protect Stitch from being captured.

=== The Kingdom Keepers ===
Stitch appears in the Kingdom Keepers novel series, written by Ridley Pearson.

== Reception and legacy ==
Early test screenings of Lilo & Stitch demonstrated that Stitch was a success amongst children, whereas parents did not like how extreme and rude of an antihero he was. After the success of the film, Stitch quickly became one of Disney's most popular characters, especially in terms of merchandising. The Verge's Kaitlyn Tiffany wrote in a May 2017 article arguing that the character remains popular fifteen years after Lilo & Stitch's release due to his flawed nature, which made him "endlessly relatable", and would outlast more recent characters who are similar in certain aspects to him such as the Minions of Universal Pictures's Despicable Me franchise and Baby Groot of Marvel Studios's Guardians of the Galaxy Vol. 2 as a result. In 2024, sales of Stitch-themed merchandise totaled about $2.6 billion; another $4 billion in sales were made in 2025.

Not all reception towards the character has been positive; Scott Mendelson of Forbes wrote an article released on the same day that a live-action Lilo & Stitch remake was reported to be in development stating that he preferred the human leads Lilo and Nani over Stitch, considering Stitch to be a detriment to the film. Mendelson stated that he hated the alien character because "he spent 99% of the movie making [Lilo and Nani's] lives even harder to the point of possible ruin and death" and that watching the character's mischief "was an exercise in frustration and concern for the sympathetic human leads."

Since the release of the original animated film, Lilo & Stitch fans annually celebrate June 26 as "Stitch Day" or "626 Day" as a celebration of the character, the film, and the franchise as a whole. The date refers to Stitch's Experiment 626 codename, as June 26 is written as "6/26" in month-day format. Disney has since embraced the day with various promotions focusing on Stitch.
