= Sydney Agudong =

American actress and singer (born 2000)

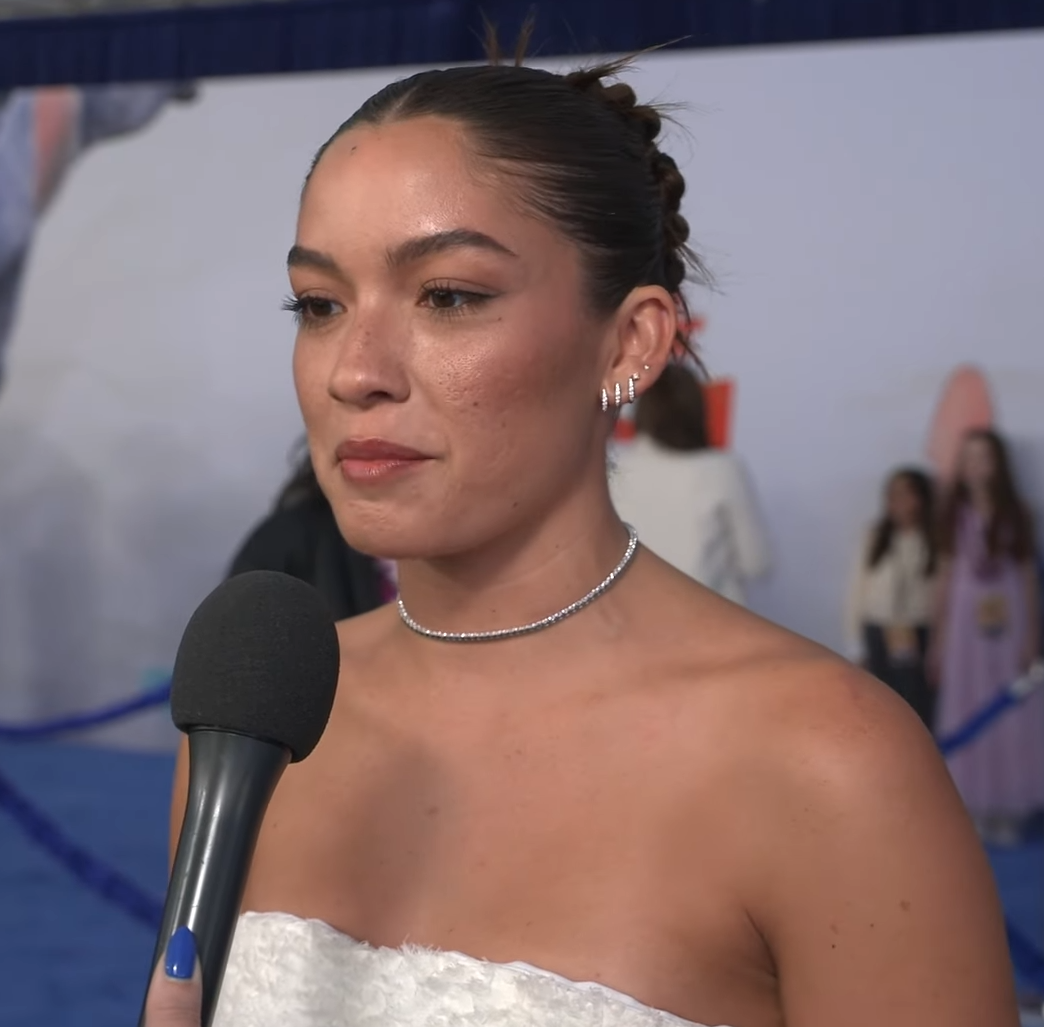
- Agudong at the world premiere of Lilo & Stitch in 2025
- Born: Sydney Elizebeth Agudong; November 13, 2000 (age 25); Kauaʻi, Hawaii, U.S.
- Occupations: Actress; singer
- Years active: 2011–present
- Relatives: Siena Agudong (sister)

Sydney Elizebeth Agudong (born November 13, 2000) is an American actress and singer. Agudong is best known for her role as Nani Pelekai in Lilo & Stitch (2025) and its upcoming 2028 sequel.

== Early life ==
Sydney Elizebeth Agudong was born in Kauai, Hawaii, and is of Caucasian and Filipino descent. Her younger sister Siena Agudong is also an actress.

Agudong grew up participating in theater, talent shows and pageants and was named the 2010 Miss Hawaii Preteen. When she was 11 and her sister was 7 they began going to Los Angeles for acting auditions. When she attended Island School, she initially concentrated more on her social life before taking up songwriting in her junior and senior year. She wrote her first song "I'm So Sorry" entirely during a math class, and it received air time on KQNG-FM.

== Career ==
After graduating school in 2018, Agudong moved to Los Angeles to pursue acting again alongside her music career. She writes music under the persona of Jayne Doe who she states is "basically [her] own version of Hannah Montana" and is an "unapologetic soul searcher". Her debut single "Welcome to Hollywood" was released in 2022 which she said was about her "relationship to [her] dreams in Hollywood". She cited artists and bands she looked up to as including Briston Maroney, Frank Ocean, Queen, Elton John, The Beatles, Pink Floyd, Billy Joel, John Fogerty, and The Backseat Lovers.

Agudong starred in the low-budget film West Michigan (2021). She made her television debut playing Jamal's (Brett Gray) prom date in the final season of On My Block. She played a social media influencer whose friend disappears in the web series Find Millie Martin (2022) and played Savannah in At Her Feet (2024), an adventure film shot at the Hawaiʻi Volcanoes National Park. Agudong's other acting credits include NCIS, Ether, and Infamously in Love.

Agudong's first major starring role was as Nani Pelekai in Lilo & Stitch (2025). Both she and her sister had auditioned for the role and were the final two candidates considered. Agudong played Aria in the drama series Ripple.

== Filmography ==
=== Film ===
Film roles
Year	Title	Role	Notes
2013	Second Chances	Ellen	
2021	Turning the Tide	Skylar	Short film
2021	West Michigan	Jasmine	
2021	Cool, Awesome, and Desirable	Riley	Short film
2021	Terminally Unique	Kelly	Short film
2024	At Her Feet	Savannah	
2025	Lilo & Stitch	Nani Pelekai	Credited as "Sydney Elizebeth Agudong"
2025	Ether	Tessa	Post-production
2026	Jilliahsmen Trinity: 2.0 - R.O.Y.G.B.I.V		Post-production

=== Television ===
Film and television roles
Year	Title	Role	Notes
2021	On My Block	Charlize	2 episodes: "Chapter Twenty-Nine" and "The Final Chapter"
2022	Infamously in Love	Karina	Television film
2023	NCIS	Kelly	Episode: "Unusual Suspects"
2023	Trapped in the Farmhouse	Kylie	Television film
2025	Ripple	Aria	Main role; 8 episodes

=== Web ===
Web roles
Year	Title	Role	Notes
2022	Find Millie Martin	Sara Sanders	Web series; also credited for writing additional material
