= List of animated feature films nominated for Golden Raspberry Awards =

This page highlights the animated feature films nominated for or won Golden Raspberry Awards. The difference between the Golden Raspberry Awards and its competitors is that it does not have a Worst Animated Film category.

== Feature film categories ==
=== Worst Picture ===
Animated feature films were nominated for Worst Picture in only one case: 2017. The Emoji Movie is the only animated feature film Worst Picture nominee and winner.

Year	Film	Award Recipient(s)	Studio	Result
2017 (38th)	The Emoji Movie	Michelle Raimo Kouyate	Sony Pictures Animation	Won

=== Worst Director ===
Only one animated film has been nominated in the Worst Director category.

Year	Film	Award Recipient(s)	Studio	Result
2017 (38th)	The Emoji Movie	Tony Leondis	Sony Pictures Animation	Won

=== Worst Remake, Rip-off or Sequel ===
Two animated films have been nominated in the Worst Remake, Rip-off or Sequel category.

Year	Film	Studio	Result
2008 (29th)	Star Wars: The Clone Wars	Warner Bros.	Nominated
2025 (46th)	Smurfs	Paramount Pictures; Paramount Animation	Nominated

== Writing (screenplay) categories ==
=== Worst Screenplay ===
The lone film nominated in this category was produced/distributed by Sony Pictures Animation.

Year	Film	Award Recipient(s)	Result
2017 (38th)	The Emoji Movie	Tony Leondis, Eric Siegel (screenplay and story), Mike White (screenplay)	Won

== Acting categories ==
=== Worst Actor ===
Year	Actor	Film	Character(s)	Result
2002 (23rd)	Adam Sandler	Eight Crazy Nights	Davey Stone / Whitey Duvall / Eleanore Duvall / Deer	Nominated
2018 (39th)	Johnny Deep	Sherlock Gnomes	Sherlock Gnomes	Nominated
2022 (43rd)	Pete Davidson	Marmaduke	Marmaduke	Nominated

=== Worst Supporting Actor ===
Year	Actor	Film	Character(s)	Result
2014 (35th)	Kelsey Grammer	Legends of Oz: Dorothy's Return	Tin Man	Won

== Music categories ==
=== Worst Original Song ===
From the category's inception in 1980 until 1999 and then again only in 2002, one animated film won this music category, Thumbelina.

Year	Film	Song/Award Recipient(s)	Studio	Result
1994 (15th)	Thumbelina	"Marry the Mole"; Barry Manilow (Music), Jack Feldman and Bruce Sussman (Lyric)	Don Bluth Ireland Limited	Won

== Miscellaneous categories ==
=== Worst New Star ===
From the category's inception in 1981 until 1988 and then again from 1990 to 1998, only one animated film was nominated for this category, Beavis and Butt-Head Do America.

Year	Film	Award Recipient(s)	Studio	Result
1996 (17th)	Beavis and Butt-Head Do America	Beavis and Butt-Head	Paramount Pictures	Nominated

=== Worst Screen Combo ===
Year	Film	Award Recipient(s)	Studio	Result
1996 (17th)	Beavis and Butt-Head Do America	Beavis and Butt-Head	Paramount Pictures	Nominated
2017 (38th)	The Emoji Movie	Any two obnoxious Emojis	Sony Pictures Animation	Won
2018 (39th)	Sherlock Gnomes	Johnny Depp and his fast-fading film career	Paramount Animation and Metro-Goldwyn-Mayer	Nominated
2025 (46th)	Smurfs	James Corden and Rihanna	Paramount Pictures; Paramount Animation	Nominated

=== One-off categories ===
Year	Category	Film/Award Recipient(s)	Studio	Result
1996 (17th)	Worst Written Film Grossing Over $100 Million	The Hunchback of Notre Dame—Tab Murphy, Irene Mecchi, Bob Tzudiker and Noni White	Walt Disney Feature Animation	Nominated
2002 (23rd)	Most Flatulent Teen-Targeted Movie	Eight Crazy Nights	Columbia Pictures	Nominated
2017 (38th)	The Razzie Nominee So Rotten You Loved It	The Emoji Movie	Sony Pictures Animation	Nominated

== Razzie Redeemer Award ==
Razzie Redeemer Award is an award presented to a previous Razzie Award nominee or winner who appears in a successful film after releasing films with critical or commercial failure.

Year	Recipient	From	To	Result
2018 (39th)	Sony Pictures Animation	The crass multi-Razzie winner, The Emoji Movie	The highly acclaimed Spider-Man: Into the Spider-Verse which was loved by critics and audiences alike	Nominated
2019 (40th)	Keanu Reeves	6-time Razzie nominee	John Wick: Chapter 3 – Parabellum and Toy Story 4	Nominated

== Live-action/animated films ==
A Live-action animated film blends various traditional animation or computer animation in live action films.

=== Competitive awards ===
Year	Film	Category	Award Recipient(s)	Result
1992 (13th)	Cool World	Worst Actress	Kim Basinger	Nominated
1994 (15th)	The Pagemaster	Worst Actor	Macaulay Culkin	Nominated
2000 (21st)	The Adventures of Rocky and Bullwinkle	Worst Supporting Actress	Rene Russo	Nominated
2002 (23rd)	Scooby-Doo	Most Flatulent Teen-Targeted Movie	Warner Bros.	Nominated
2002 (23rd)	Scooby-Doo	Worst Supporting Actor	Freddie Prinze Jr.	Nominated
2003 (24th)	Kangaroo Jack	Worst Supporting Actor	Anthony Anderson	Nominated
2003 (24th)	Kangaroo Jack	Worst Supporting Actor	Christopher Walken	Nominated
2004 (25th)	Scooby-Doo 2: Monsters Unleashed	Worst Remake or Sequel	Warner Bros.	Won
2006 (27th)	Garfield: A Tail of Two Kitties	Worst Excuse for Family Entertainment	20th Century Fox	Nominated
2006 (27th)	Garfield: A Tail of Two Kitties	Worst Prequel or Sequel	20th Century Fox	Nominated
2013 (34th)	The Smurfs 2	Worst Remake, Rip-off or Sequel	Sony Pictures Animation	Nominated
2014 (35th)	Teenage Mutant Ninja Turtles	Worst Director	Jonathan Liebesman	Nominated
2014 (35th)	Teenage Mutant Ninja Turtles	Worst Picture	Paramount Pictures, Nickelodeon Movies, Platinum Dunes	Nominated
2014 (35th)	Teenage Mutant Ninja Turtles	Worst Remake, Rip-off or Sequel	Paramount Pictures, Nickelodeon Movies, Platinum Dunes	Nominated
2014 (35th)	Teenage Mutant Ninja Turtles	Worst Screenplay	Evan Daugherty, André Nemec and Josh Appelbaum, based on characters created by Peter Laird and Kevin Eastman	Nominated
2014 (35th)	Teenage Mutant Ninja Turtles	Worst Supporting Actress	Megan Fox	Won
2015 (36th)	Alvin and the Chipmunks: The Road Chip	Worst Remake, Rip-off or Sequel	20th Century Fox	Nominated
2015 (36th)	Alvin and the Chipmunks: The Road Chip	Worst Supporting Actor	Jason Lee	Nominated
2015 (36th)	Alvin and the Chipmunks: The Road Chip	Worst Supporting Actress	Kaley Cuoco	Won
2016 (37th)	Teenage Mutant Ninja Turtles: Out of the Shadows	Worst Actress	Megan Fox	Nominated
2016 (37th)	Teenage Mutant Ninja Turtles: Out of the Shadows	Worst Remake, Rip-off or Sequel	Paramount Pictures, Nickelodeon Movies, Platinum Dunes	Nominated
2021 (42nd)	Space Jam: A New Legacy	Worst Actor	LeBron James	Won
2021 (42nd)	Space Jam: A New Legacy	Worst Picture	Warner Bros.	Nominated
2021 (42nd)	Space Jam: A New Legacy	Worst Remake, Rip-off or Sequel	Warner Bros.	Won
2021 (42nd)	Space Jam: A New Legacy	Worst Screen Combo	LeBron James & any Warner cartoon character (or Time-Warner product) he dribbles on	Won
2021 (42nd)	Tom & Jerry	Worst Remake, Rip-off or Sequel	Warner Bros.	Nominated
2021 (42nd)	Tom & Jerry	Worst Screen Combo	Tom & Jerry (aka Itchy & Scratchy)	Nominated
2024 (45th)	Harold and the Purple Crayon	Worst Actor	Zachary Levi	Nominated
2024 (45th)	Mufasa: The Lion King	Worst Remake, Rip-off or Sequel	Disney	Nominated
2025 (46th)	Snow White			
2025 (46th)	Snow White	Worst Picture	Disney	Nominated
2025 (46th)	Snow White	Worst Remake, Rip-off or Sequel	Disney	Nominated
2025 (46th)	Snow White	Worst Director	Marc Webb	Nominated
2025 (46th)	Snow White	Worst Supporting Actor	All Seven Artificial Dwarfs	Won
2025 (46th)	Snow White	Worst Screen Combo	All Seven Artificial Dwarfs	Won
2025 (46th)	Snow White	Worst Screenplay	Various	Nominated
