= Lilo & Stitch (disambiguation) =

Lilo & Stitch is a 2002 American animated film from Walt Disney Animation Studios.

Lilo & Stitch may also refer to:

- Lilo & Stitch (franchise), an American media franchise spun-off from the 2002 film

== Works based on the 2002 film ==
- Lilo & Stitch (2002 soundtrack), an album composed by Alan Silvestri for the 2002 film
- Disney's Lilo & Stitch (GBA video game), a video game developed by Digital Eclipse
- Lilo & Stitch: Trouble in Paradise, released for PlayStation in the United States as simply Lilo & Stitch, a PlayStation and Windows video game developed by Blitz Games

== Other works ==
- Lilo & Stitch: The Series, also simply known as Disney's Lilo & Stitch, a sequel animated television series to the 2002 film that aired from 2003 to 2006
- Lilo & Stitch (2025 film), a 2025 live action remake of the 2002 animated film
  - Lilo & Stitch (2025 soundtrack), an album composed by Dan Romer for the 2025 film
