= Lilo & Stitch 2: Stitch Has a Glitch =

2005 animated film by Tony Leondis and Michael LaBash

- DVD cover
- Directed by: Tony Leondis; Michael LaBash
- Written by: Tony Leondis; Michael LaBash; Eddie Guzelian; Alexa Junge
- Produced by: Christopher Chase
- Starring: Chris Sanders; Dakota Fanning; Tia Carrere; David Ogden Stiers; Kevin McDonald; Jason Scott Lee
- Edited by: William J. Caparella
- Music by: Joel McNeely
- Production company: Disneytoon Studios
- Distributed by: Walt Disney Home Entertainment (Note: Released through the Walt Disney Pictures banner.)
- Release dates: August 15, 2005 (Turtle Bay Resort); August 30, 2005 (Home video)
- Running time: 68 minutes
- Country: United States
- Language: English

Lilo & Stitch 2: Stitch Has a Glitch (Note: Titled simply as Lilo & Stitch 2 on its title card.) is a 2005 American direct-to-video animated science fiction comedy-drama film produced by the Australian office of Disneytoon Studios. It was directed by Tony Leondis and Michael LaBash (in their directorial debuts), both of whom co-wrote the film with Eddie Guzelian and Alexa Junge. It is the third film released in the Lilo & Stitch franchise and the second film in the franchise's animated chronology, taking place between the events of Lilo & Stitch (2002) and Lilo & Stitch: The Series' pilot, Stitch! The Movie (2003), primarily serving as a direct sequel to the former. The film premiered at Turtle Bay Resort in Kahuku, Hawaii, on August 15, 2005, and was released on DVD and VHS on August 30, 2005, by Walt Disney Home Entertainment.

== Plot ==
After joining the Pelekai family and before his fellow experiments become scattered across Kauaʻi, Stitch awakens from a nightmare about reverting to his former programming and attacking Earth, notably assaulting Lilo. After consoling Stitch, Lilo tests his current morality by having him do a few good deeds before using a hovercraft to get to her hula class.

At class, Lilo's teacher, Moses Puloki, announces that the class will be performing at the local May Day festival, with each student being required to create an original dance. Lilo is inspired when Moses recounts how her mother won the competition at her age. After class, Mertle Edmonds spites Lilo about following in her mother's footsteps, leading to her physically retaliating. As a result of this, Moses believes that Lilo is not ready for the competition, but she refutes that claim and vows to better herself.

While preparing for the competition, Lilo and Stitch have a hard time coming up with ideas. One night, Stitch unexpectedly experiences some seizures, which cause him to act abnormally. It is soon revealed that, following Stitch's creation, Jumba failed to fully charge his molecular structure prior to his arrest. At first, this molecular defect causes Stitch to revert to his former programming against his own will, but his molecules will eventually shut down and he will ultimately die from it if the charging process is not rectified before his life energy depletes.

The defect causes friction between Lilo and Stitch, threatening to ruin Lilo’s chances for success at the hula competition. They try to be inspired for their hula, but Stitch's condition continuously persists. Since Lilo is so concerned about winning the competition, she presumes that Stitch's new behavior is deliberate and begins to neglect him, to his chagrin and eventual distress. Elsewhere, Nani's boyfriend, David Kawena, believes she is losing interest in him, so Pleakley attempts to revitalize their relationship.

A hula based on the legend of Hiʻiaka is eventually devised, but Lilo’s ire lingers as Stitch's condition ruins their practice sessions. Meanwhile, Jumba is forced to improvise using household objects to construct a machine for the recharge process. On the day of the competition, Stitch attempts to wish Lilo luck, but when he has another seizure, a confused Lilo becomes concerned about his well-being, whereupon he inadvertently assaults her like in his nightmare. Knowing that he would never do that intentionally, Lilo finally becomes aware of Stitch's condition and tries to inquire, but the latter, greatly horrified and ashamed of what he had done, resolves to run away, now believing himself to be lethal.

Lilo ultimately forfeits the competition mid-performance to help Stitch, during which she, Nani and David learn about the situation from Jumba and Pleakley. As Stitch attempts to leave Earth in Jumba's spaceship, Lilo and the others desperately try to have him reconsider. About to take off as he declines, Stitch has one final seizure, which causes him to lose control and crash the ship in the mountains. Lilo flies their hovercraft over to the crash site and hurriedly gets Stitch into the now-completed machine, but it is too late and Stitch seemingly dies. A devastated Lilo apologizes for her mistreatment towards him and prioritizing her needs over his before declaring that she will always love him; this soon fully rejuvenates Stitch, to everyone's relief.

That night, the family and David perform Lilo's hula as Nani informs her sister that their mother would be proud; a star in the sky twinkles to justify her claim.

== Voice cast ==
- Chris Sanders as Stitch / Experiment 626, a koala-like illegal genetic experiment from the planet Turo who found his place as part of an extended family on Earth.
- Dakota Fanning as Lilo Pelekai, the eccentric young Hawaiian girl who adopted Stitch.
- Tia Carrere as Nani Pelekai, Lilo's older sister and legal guardian.
- David Ogden Stiers as Dr. Jumba Jookiba, the Kweltikwan mad scientist who created Stitch.
- Kevin McDonald as Wendy Pleakley, a Plorgonarian and former agent of the United Galactic Federation assigned as Jumba's assistant on Earth, who now lives with him there along with Stitch and the Pelekais.
- Jason Scott Lee as David Kawena, Nani's surfer boyfriend.
- Liliana Mumy as Mertle Edmonds, one of Lilo's hula classmates and main rival.
- Kunewa Mook as Moses Puloki (credited as "Kumu"), Lilo's hula teacher.

Additional voices include William J. Caparella, Holliston Coleman, Matt Corboy, Jennifer Hale, Jillian Henry, Emily Osment and Paul C. Vogt. Among them, Coleman voices Teresa, a girl with wavy hair in Lilo's hula class and Mertle's posse who Moses calls "Aleka" in this film, (Note: Disneytoon Studios gave all three girls in Mertle's posse different names from what they were given in Lilo & Stitch: The Series, but only Teresa's differing name was revealed.) Henry voices Elena, the blonde-haired girl in said class and posse (reprising her role from Lilo & Stitch: The Series), and Vogt voices the leader of a trio of the United Galactic Federation's troopers (called the "Intergalactic Police" in this film) sent to arrest Jumba in the flashback detailing Stitch's creation.

== Production ==
=== Cast and recording ===
This is the only animated film in the series without child actress Daveigh Chase who voices Lilo in all other animated Lilo & Stitch films. According to Disney Animation Studios, Chase was so busy working on Lilo & Stitch: The Series that she suggested to have her good friend, renowned child actress Dakota Fanning, fill in for her. Chris Sanders, the voice of Stitch and writer and director of the first film, did not participate fully. The film additionally became Disney's first and only direct-to-video animated film to be rated PG by the MPAA for some mild action. Jason Scott Lee, who voiced David in the first film, reprised his role, making it the final time he voiced the character.

=== Animation ===
The animation was produced by Walt Disney Animation (Australia) Inc., Australis Productions and A. Film A/S, although those animation studios, sans the second one, were never credited.

== The Origin of Stitch short film ==
The Origin of Stitch
- Directed by: Mike Disa; Tony Bancroft (co-director)
- Screenplay by: Eddie Guzelian; Michael LaBash
- Produced by: Ben Chambers
- Starring: Chris Sanders; David Ogden Stiers; Tress MacNeille
- Edited by: Robert Cole
- Music by: Christopher Tin
- Production companies: Walt Disney Pictures; Disneytoon Studios; Toonacious Family Entertainment
- Distributed by: Walt Disney Home Entertainment
- Release dates: August 30, 2005 (with Lilo & Stitch 2: Stitch Has a Glitch)
- Running time: 4 minutes
- Country: United States

The Origin of Stitch (Note: Also called The Origin of Stitch: Secret File on its title card.) is an animated short film included on the DVD release of Lilo & Stitch 2: Stitch Has a Glitch. The short has a total running time of 4:35 minutes and serves as a bridge between Stitch Has a Glitch and Stitch! The Movie (as well as Lilo & Stitch: The Series). In the short, Stitch discovers Jumba's secret computer that reveals what creatures Jumba had used to create Stitch and also hints at the rest of his experiments. Stitch is scared to find out what he was conceived as, only for Jumba to come and explain how he found love when he met Lilo, expressing pride towards him for going beyond his original programming and becoming a better version of himself. The short was directed by Mike Disa and co-directed by Tony Bancroft.

Toonacious Family Entertainment produced the short with coloring done by Powerhouse Animation of Austin, Texas.

== Soundtrack ==
Disney's Lilo & Stitch Island Favorites Featuring Songs from Lilo & Stitch 2: Stitch Has a Glitch

Soundtrack album by Various artists
- Released: August 30, 2005
- Recorded: 2004–2005
- Genres: Rock, country rock, pop
- Label: Walt Disney

Lilo & Stitch music chronology
Lilo & Stitch (2002)	Disney's Lilo & Stitch Island Favorites Featuring Songs from Lilo & Stitch 2: Stitch Has a Glitch (2005)	Lilo & Stitch Hawaiian Album (2006)

Professional ratings
Review scores
Source	Rating
AllMusic	3/5 stars

Disney's Lilo & Stitch Island Favorites Featuring Songs from Lilo & Stitch 2: Stitch Has a Glitch is the soundtrack album to Lilo & Stitch 2. The soundtrack is partly an updated repackaging of another album also titled Disney's Lilo & Stitch: Island Favorites that was released in November 2002, reusing some of the same songs that appeared on that album. The song "He Mele No Lilo" had been included in the first film, Lilo & Stitch. "Hawaiian Roller Coaster Ride", also from the original film, appears in two versions; a cover of the song by Jump5 (who performed the Lilo & Stitch: The Series theme song "Aloha, E Komo Mai") and a remixed version of the original performed by Mark Kealiʻi Hoʻomalu and the Kamehameha Schools Children's Chorus. The soundtrack also includes Tia Carrere's (the voice of Nani) version of "Aloha ʻOe" as performed in the original film, but with additional backing instrumentation. It was released by Walt Disney Records on August 30, 2005.

Track listing
No.	Title	Performer	Length
1.	"Hawaiian Roller Coaster Ride"	Jump5	3:03
2.	"A Little Less Conversation" (JXL Remix)	Elvis Presley	3:32
3.	"He Mele No Lilo"	Mark Kealiʻi Hoʻomalu and The Kamehameha Schools Children's Chorus	2:03
4.	"The Old Hawaiian Song"	The Big Kahuna and the Copa Cat Pack	3:21
5.	"I Need Your Love Tonight"	Elvis Presley	2:03
6.	"My Little Grass Shack"	Lisa Loeb	2:35
7.	"Rubberneckin'"	Elvis Presley	2:08
8.	"Pineapple Princess"	Annette Funicello	2:25
9.	"Lahaina"	The Volcanoes	2:34
10.	"Rock-A-Hula Baby"	Collin Ray and the Jordanaires	2:04
11.	"Always"	David and Dennis Kamakahi	3:23
12.	"Aloha ʻOe"	Tia Carrere	1:17
13.	"Hawaiian Roller Coaster Ride"	Alan Silvestri, Mark Kealiʻi Hoʻomalu, The Kamehameha Schools Children's Chorus	1:26
Total length:			32:19

=== Charts ===
Chart (2005)	Peak position
US Billboard Top Soundtracks	13
US Billboard Kid Albums	8

== Release ==
Although originally slated for a theatrical release (like Return to Never Land), it was released to DVD and VHS on August 30, 2005, due to the poor reception of The Jungle Book 2. Nevertheless, the film received a premiere showing fifteen days prior on August 15 at Turtle Bay Resort on the Hawaiian island of Oahu. This is the last Lilo & Stitch film to have a VHS release; the fourth film, Leroy & Stitch, released in 2006, would later be only released on DVD.

The DVD extras include The Origin of Stitch short film, a music video for the song "Hawaiian Roller Coaster Ride" performed by Jump5, and two games ("Jumba's Experiment Profiler" and "Where's Pleakley?" – similar to Where's Waldo?).

== Critical reception ==
On critical response aggregation website, Rotten Tomatoes, the film has a rating of 42%, and an average score of 5.7 out of 10 based on 12 reviews.

Hi-Def Digest said, "The humor in the second movie is juvenile, and lacking in the wit that makes the first so distinctive. The characterizations are heavily simplified, to the point where some of the characters feel dumbed down. Also, a lame subplot involving one of Lilo's peers feels silly and has a poor resolution. Even worse is the false sentimentality of the climax, which feels like cheap heartstring-tugging". ReelFilm gave a 2.5 out of 5 star rating, saying "Lilo & Stitch 2 is cute enough – there are a few genuinely funny moments here, while the voice acting is surprisingly effective – although the film does eventually wear out its welcome".

In a 2019 list of direct-to-video sequels, prequels, and "mid-quels" to Disney animated films, Petrana Radulovic of Polygon ranked Lilo & Stitch 2 first out of twenty-six films on the list, appreciating its faithfulness to the original film's tone. She stated, "The other two Lilo & Stitch sequels were just fine, (Note: Radulovic respectively ranked Stitch! The Movie and Leroy & Stitch tenth and ninth on the same list.) but they didn't capture the essence of what made the original special, choosing instead to focus on aliens. Stitch Has a Glitch, however, manages to balance the alien story with the human one. [...] Overall, the movie verges on being cheesy, but it is a satisfying, heartwarming type of goo, with very funny moments and gags". In a similar list in 2020, Lisa Wehrstedt of Insider ranked Lilo & Stitch 2 second out of twenty-five films on her list, behind The Lion King II: Simba's Pride. Werhstedt, who considered the film "heartwarming" and "sweet", wrote that the film "manages to keep the perfect mix of cute and wacky that made the first one so charming".

At the 33rd Annie Awards, Lilo & Stitch 2 won the Annie Award for Best Animated Home Entertainment Production.
