= St. Alban's Episcopal Church (Los Angeles, California) =

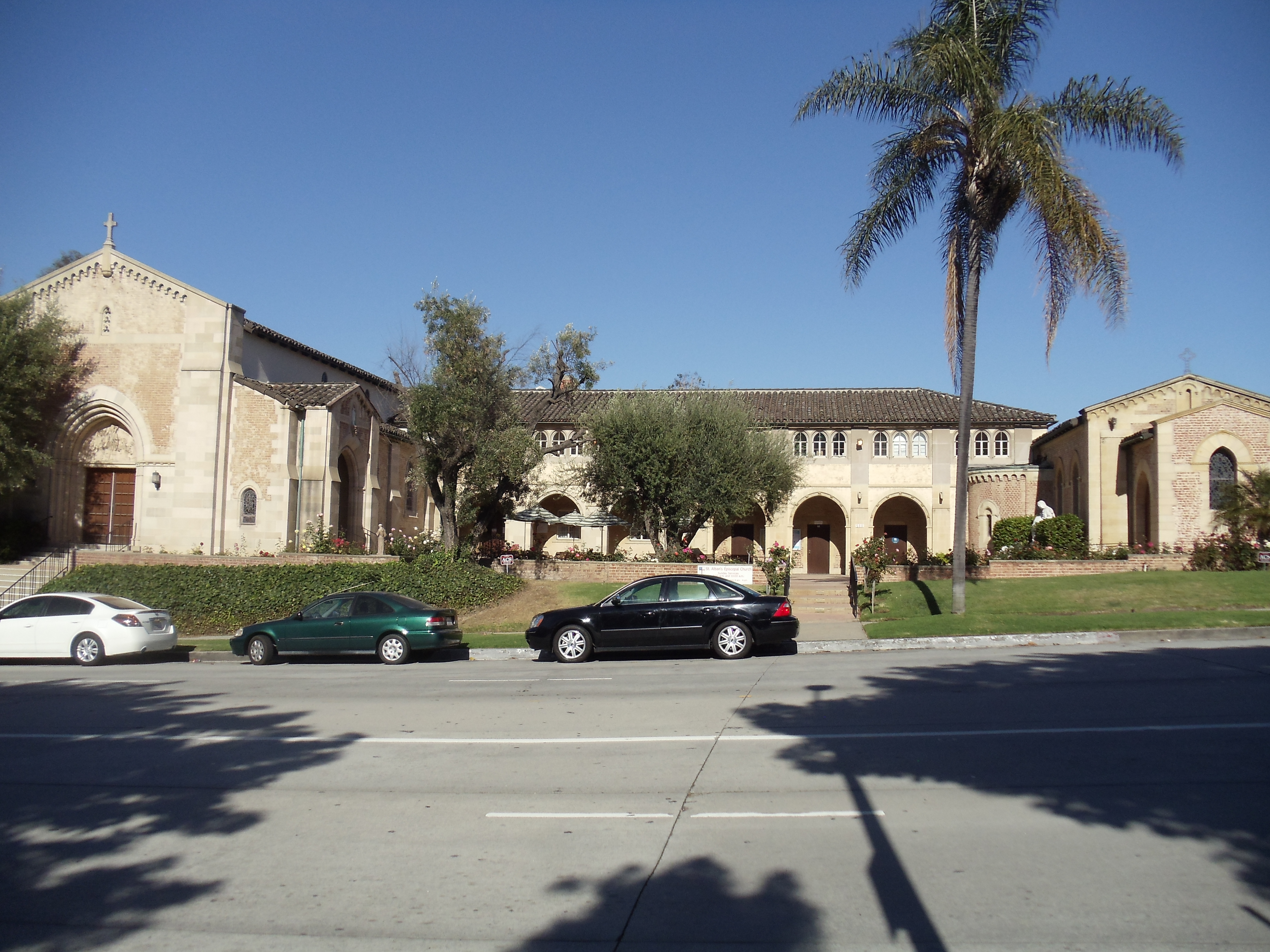
- St. Alban's Episcopal Church on Hilgard Avenue, Westwood, Los Angeles.
- St. Alban's Episcopal Church
- 34.06987°N 118.4384°W
- Location: 580 Hilgard Avenue, Los Angeles, California
- Country: United States
- Denomination: Episcopal
- Website: stalbanswestwood.com

Architecture
- Architect: Percy Parke Lewis
- Years built: 1930-1931

Administration
- Diocese: Los Angeles

Clergy
- Rector: The Rev. Adam L. Dawkins

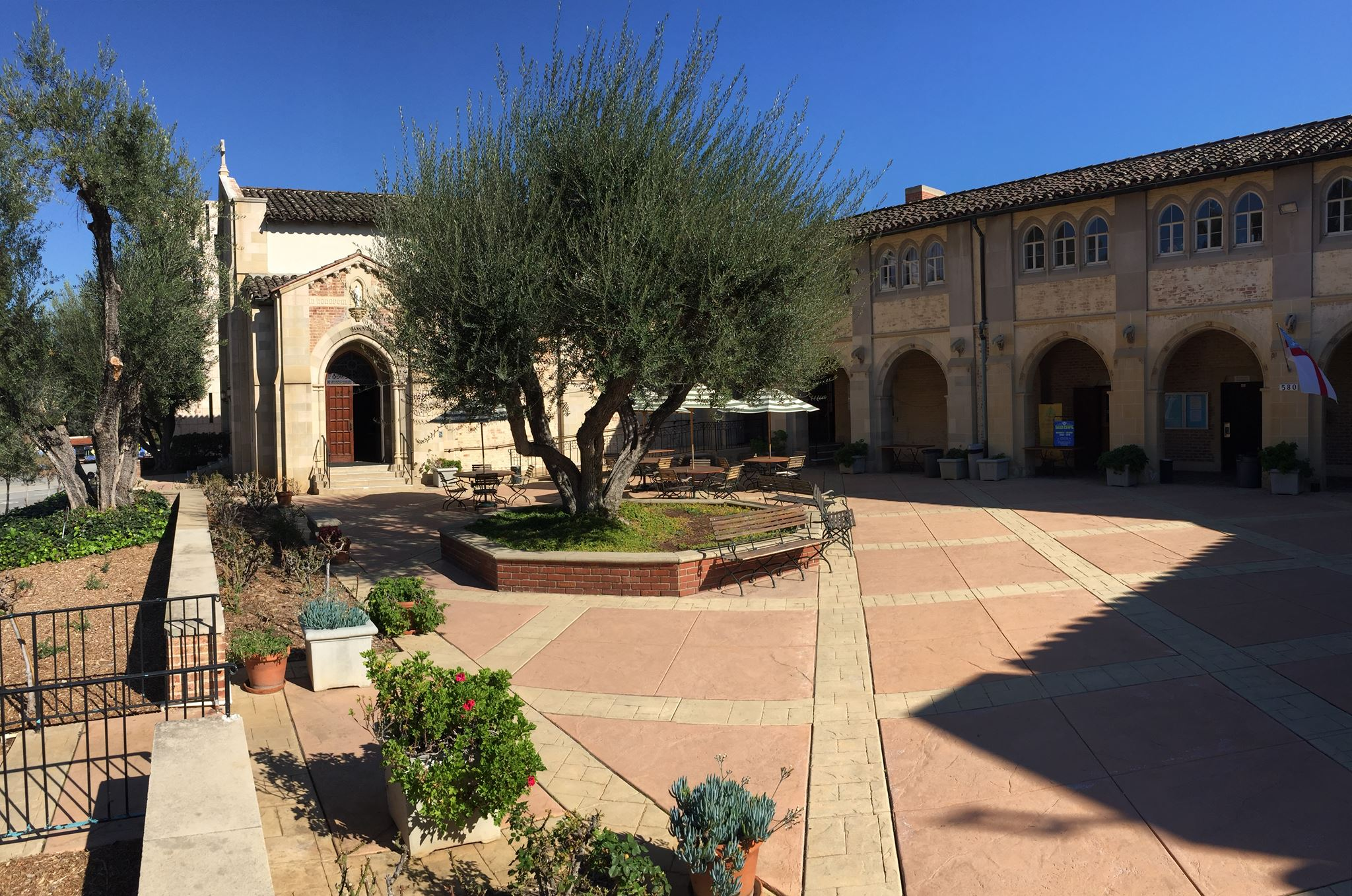
The Courtyard at St. Alban's Episcopal Church.

St. Alban's Episcopal Church is an Episcopal church located at 580 Hilgard Avenue in Westwood, Los Angeles, California.

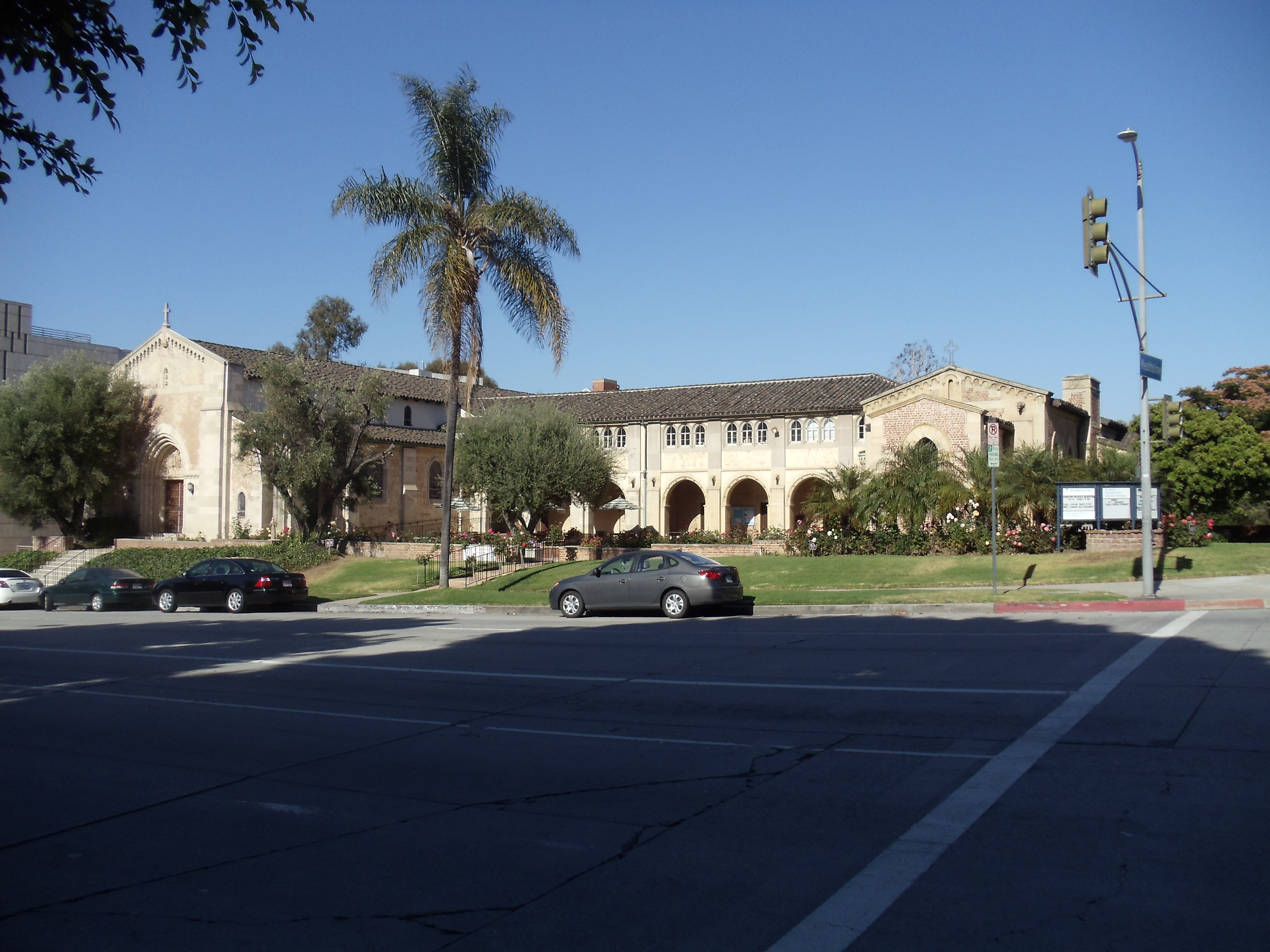
St. Alban's Episcopal Church on Hilgard Avenue, Westwood, Los Angeles

In 2016, the church reported 326 members; in 2023, it reported 110 members. No membership statistics were reported in 2024 national parochial reports. Plate and pledge financial support reported by the church in 2024 was $172,480. Average Sunday Attendance (ASA) reported by the church in 2024 was 63 persons. This was a relative decrease from ASA of 84 persons reported in 2015.

== Overview ==
St. Alban's was first established as a mission of the Los Angeles, given its proximity to the University of California, Los Angeles.

The church building was designed by architect Percy Parke Lewis (1885-1962) in 1930–1931. It was named after Saint Alban, and it was dedicated to Joseph Horsfall Johnson (1895-1928), who served as the first Episcopal Bishop of Los Angeles. The Reverend John A. Bryant, the first vicar, conducted the first service on Christmas Eve, December 24, 1931.

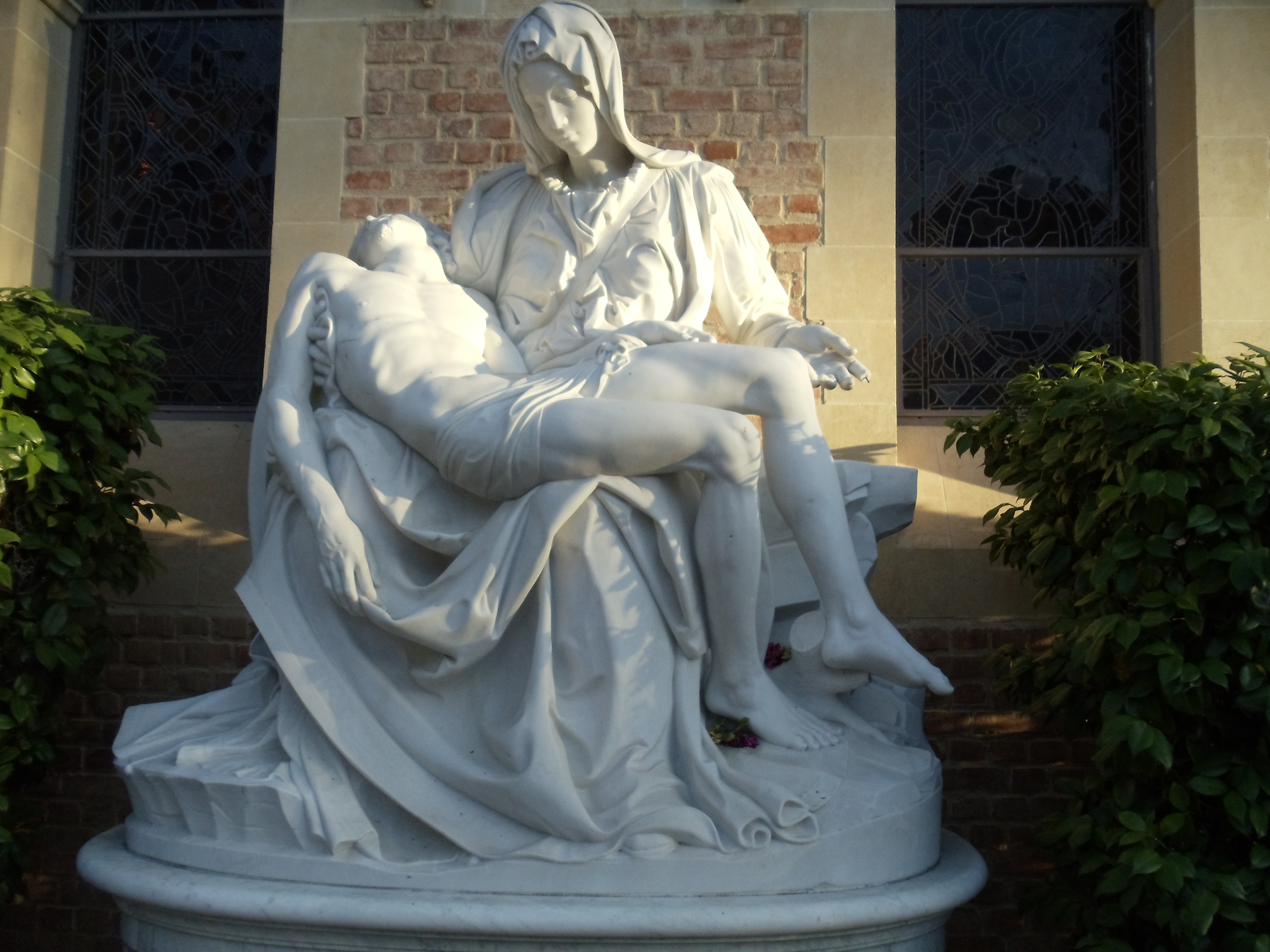
Statue in the frontyard of St. Alban's Episcopal Church on Hilgard Avenue, Westwood, Los Angeles.

It was elevated to parish status on January 25, 1941.

Actor Paul Le Mat and producer Suzanne de Passe were married in this church. The memorial service of Edward W. Carter (1911-1996) was also conducted here. So was the memorial service of director Howard Hawks (1896-1977).

The Reverend Adam L. Dawkins was inducted as St. Alban's 6th Rector on October 26, 2024. Canterbury Westwood, the Episcopal campus ministry at UCLA and surrounding universities, is based at St. Alban's. The church is also home to the 580 Café, a ministry of the Wesley Foundation, as well as the National Children's Chorus. St. Alban's church buildings underwent extensive renovations in 2024-2025.
