= 38th Golden Raspberry Awards =

Award ceremony presented by the Golden Raspberry Award Foundation in 2017

- Awarded for: Worst in film
- Date: March 3, 2018
- Site: Los Angeles, California

Highlights
- Worst Picture: The Emoji Movie
- Most awards: The Emoji Movie (4)
- Most nominations: Transformers: The Last Knight (10)

The 38th Golden Raspberry Awards, or Razzies, was an awards ceremony that identified the worst the film industry had to offer in 2017, according to votes from members of the Golden Raspberry Foundation. Razzies co-founder John J. B. Wilson has stated that the intent of the awards is "to be funny." The nominees were announced on January 22, 2018, and the winners were announced on March 3, 2018.

With its nominations for Worst Picture, Worst Director, Worst Screen Combo, and Worst Screenplay, The Emoji Movie became the first full-length animated motion picture to receive nominations for those specific categories at the Golden Raspberry Awards and to win all of these awards. A new award was also created, sponsored by Rotten Tomatoes, for "The Razzie Nominee So Rotten You Loved It", where the website readers voted for their favorite film which they thought was unfairly nominated, which was won by Baywatch. One of the film's stars, Dwayne Johnson, accepted the prize, albeit not in person. He did post a video online saying: "We made Baywatch with the best of intentions, it didn't work out like that, but I humbly and graciously accept my Razzie. And I thank you, critics, and I thank you, fans."

With 10 nominations and no wins, Transformers: The Last Knight breaks the record for most nominations without a win, beating original record holder Grown Ups 2.

== Winners and nominees ==
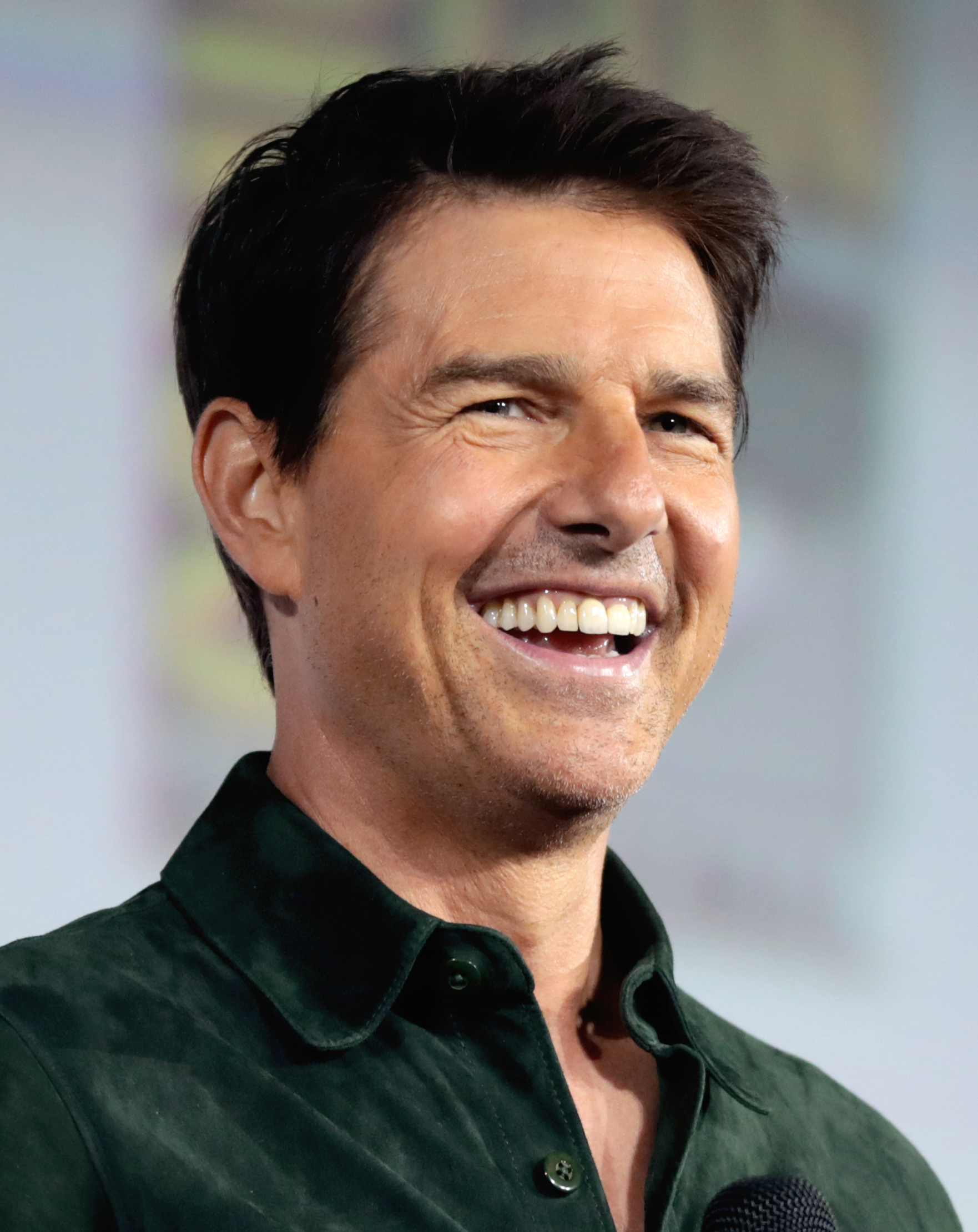
Tom Cruise, Worst Actor winner

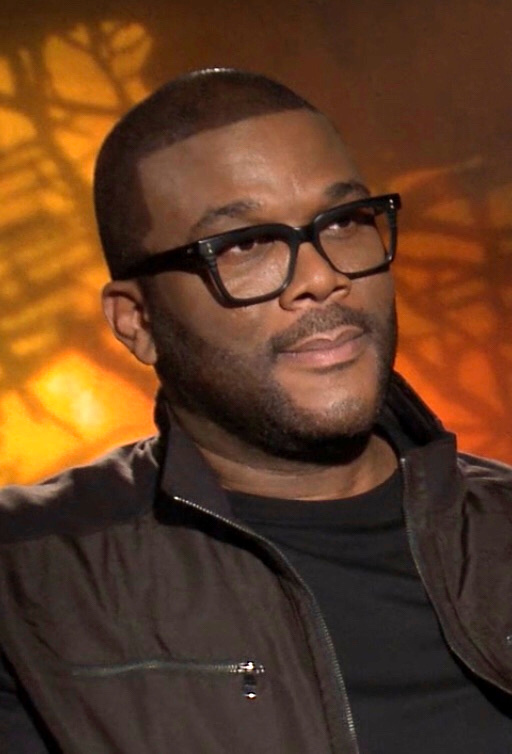
Tyler Perry, Worst Actress winner

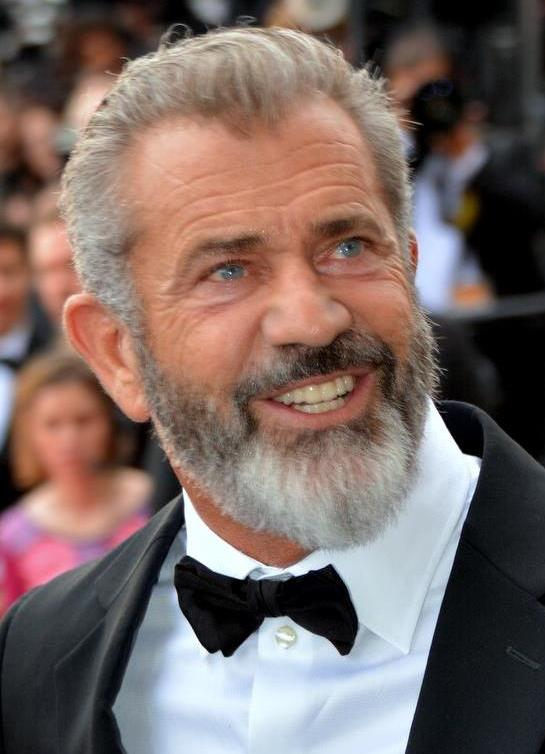
Mel Gibson, Worst Supporting Actor winner

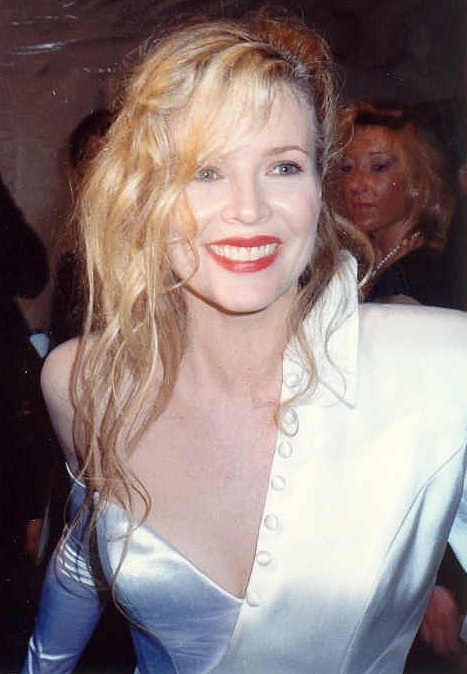
Kim Basinger, Worst Supporting Actress winner

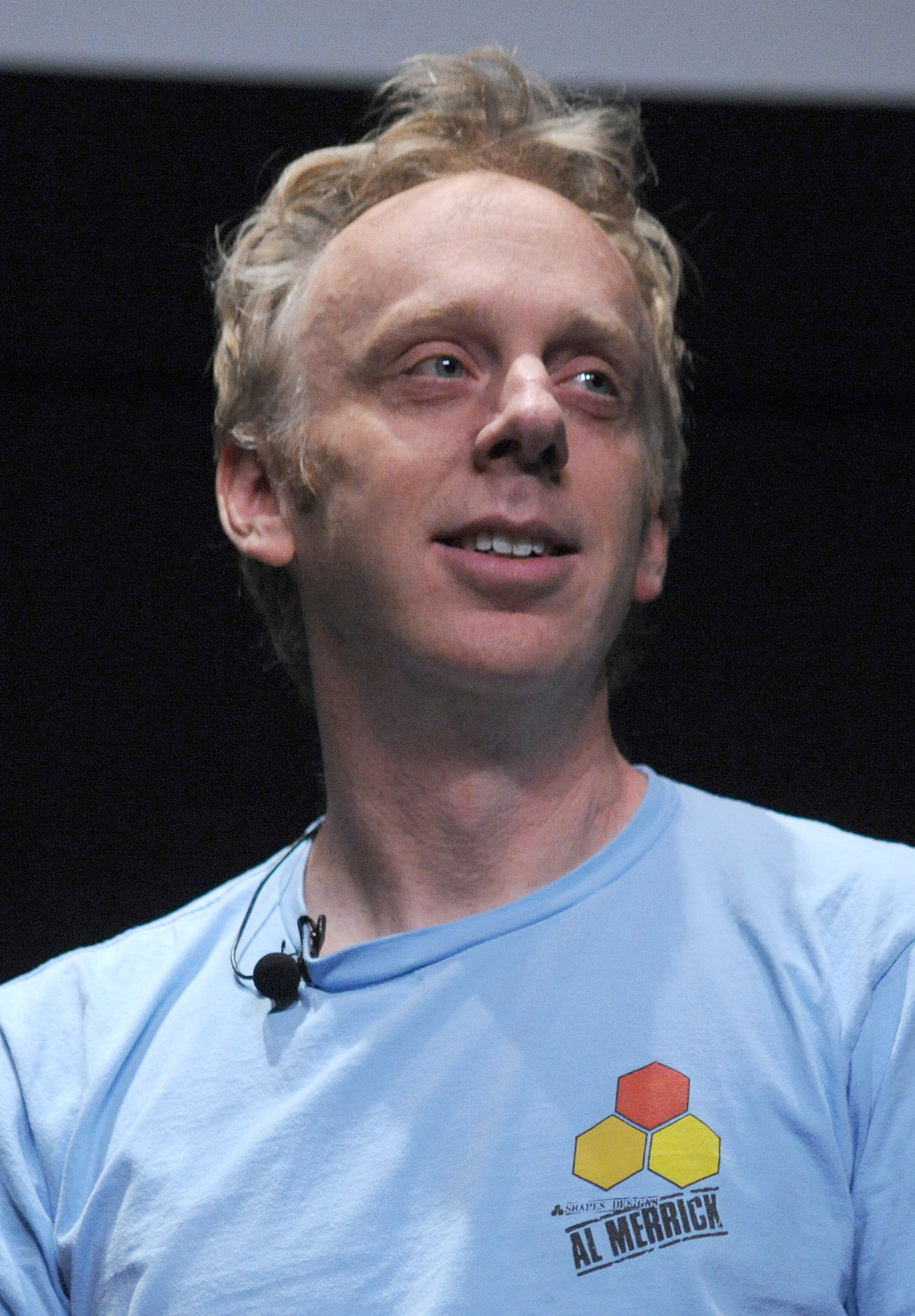
Mike White, Worst Screenplay co-winner

Worst Picture: The Emoji Movie (Columbia) – Michelle Raimo Kouyate; Baywatch (Paramount) – Michael Berk, Gregory J. Bonann, Beau Flynn, Ivan Reitman, Douglas Schwartz; Fifty Shades Darker (Universal) – Dana Brunetti, Michael De Luca, E. L. James, Marcus Viscidi; The Mummy (Universal) – Sarah Bradshaw, Sean Daniel, Alex Kurtzman, Chris Morgan; Transformers: The Last Knight (Paramount) – Ian Bryce, Lorenzo di Bonaventura, Tom DeSanto, Don Murphy	Worst Director: Tony Leondis – The Emoji Movie; Darren Aronofsky – Mother!; Michael Bay – Transformers: The Last Knight; James Foley – Fifty Shades Darker; Alex Kurtzman – The Mummy
Worst Actor: Tom Cruise – The Mummy as Nick Morton; Johnny Depp – Pirates of the Caribbean: Dead Men Tell No Tales as Captain Jack Sparrow; Jamie Dornan – Fifty Shades Darker as Christian Grey; Zac Efron – Baywatch as Matt Brody; Mark Wahlberg – Daddy's Home 2 and Transformers: The Last Knight as Dusty Mayron and Cade Yeager (respectively)	Worst Actress: Tyler Perry – Boo 2! A Madea Halloween as Mabel "Madea" Simmons; Katherine Heigl – Unforgettable as Tessa Connover; Dakota Johnson – Fifty Shades Darker as Anastasia Steele; Jennifer Lawrence – Mother! as Mother; Emma Watson – The Circle as Mae Holland
Worst Supporting Actor: Mel Gibson – Daddy's Home 2 as Kurt Mayron; Javier Bardem – Mother! and Pirates of the Caribbean: Dead Men Tell No Tales (Note: Labeled as Pirates of the Caribbean XIII: Dead Careers Tell No Tales) as Him and Captain Armando Salazar (respectively); Russell Crowe – The Mummy as Dr. Henry Jekyll; Josh Duhamel – Transformers: The Last Knight as Col. William Lennox; Anthony Hopkins – Collide and Transformers: The Last Knight as Hagen Kahl and Sir Edmund Burton (respectively)	Worst Supporting Actress: Kim Basinger – Fifty Shades Darker as Elena Lincoln; Sofia Boutella – The Mummy as Ahmanet; Laura Haddock – Transformers: The Last Knight as Viviane Wembly; Goldie Hawn – Snatched as Linda Middleton; Susan Sarandon – A Bad Moms Christmas as Isis Dunkler
Worst Screen Combo: Any two obnoxious emojis – The Emoji Movie; Any combination of two characters, two sex toys or two sexual positions – Fifty Shades Darker; Any combination of two humans, two robots or two explosions – Transformers: The Last Knight; Johnny Depp & his worn-out drunk routine – Pirates of the Caribbean: Dead Men Tell No Tales (Note: Labeled as Pirates of the Caribbean XIII: Dead Careers Tell No Tales); Tyler Perry & either the ratty old dress or worn-out wig – Boo 2! A Madea Halloween	Worst Remake, Rip-off or Sequel: Fifty Shades Darker (Universal/Focus Features); Baywatch (Paramount); Boo 2! A Madea Halloween (Lionsgate); The Mummy (Universal); Transformers: The Last Knight (Paramount)
Worst Screenplay: The Emoji Movie – Tony Leondis, Eric Siegel, & Mike White; based on the trend of emojis; Baywatch – Damian Shannon, Mark Swift, Jay Scherick, David Ronn, Thomas Lennon, & Robert Ben Garant; based on the TV series by Michael Berk, Douglas Schwartz, & Gregory J. Bonann; Fifty Shades Darker – Niall Leonard; based on the novel by E. L. James; The Mummy – David Koepp, Christopher McQuarrie, Dylan Kussman, Jon Spaihts, Alex Kurtzman, & Jenny Lumet; based on the horror movie franchise; Transformers: The Last Knight – Art Marcum, Matt Holloway, Ken Nolan, & Akiva Goldsman; based on the toys by Hasbro	The Razzie Nominee So Rotten You Loved It: Baywatch; The Emoji Movie; Fifty Shades Darker; The Mummy; Transformers: The Last Knight
Barry L. Bumstead Award: CHiPs	Razzie Redeemer Award: A Safe Hollywood-Haven – From a history of Razzie-worthy behavior unfitting for an industry of artists to where talent is protected, nourished and allowed to flourish with proper compensation.

== Films with multiple wins and nominations ==
The following nine films received multiple nominations:

Nominations	Film
10	Transformers: The Last Knight *
9	Fifty Shades Darker
8	The Mummy
5	Baywatch
5	The Emoji Movie
3	Boo 2! A Madea Halloween
3	Mother! *
3	Pirates of the Caribbean: Dead Men Tell No Tales *
2	Daddy's Home 2 *

* Films that shared at least one nomination with another.

The following films received multiple wins:

Wins	Film
4	The Emoji Movie
2	Fifty Shades Darker

== Criticism ==
Following the nomination announcement, the organization received backlash from audiences and critics with three nominations given to Mother!, which received a generally positive response from critics. The ballot was also criticized for overlooking Dane DeHaan and Cara Delevingne's critically panned performances in Luc Besson's film Valerian and the City of a Thousand Planets, despite the pre-nominations for Worst Picture and Besson for Worst Director, neither of which ended up in the final ballot.

== Box office performance of nominated films ==
Film	Budget	Box office	Net	Rotten Tomatoes	Metacritic	Ref.
A Bad Moms Christmas	$28,000,000	$130,560,428	$102,560,428	30% (4.52/10)	42/100	
Baywatch	$69,000,000	$177,856,751	$108,856,751	17% (3.95/10)	37/100	
Boo 2! A Madea Halloween	$20–25 million	$48,333,932	$23,333,932	5% (2.55/10)	17/100	
The Circle	$18,000,000	$40,651,864	$22,651,864	15% (4.11/10)	43/100	
Collide	$21,500,000	$4,811,525	–$16,688,475	21% (4.03/10)	33/100	
Daddy's Home 2	$69–70 million	$179,892,434	$110,892,434	21% (3.91/10)	30/100	
The Emoji Movie	$50,000,000	$217,776,646	$167,776,646	7% (2.67/10)	12/100	
Fifty Shades Darker	$55,000,000	$381,128,783	$326,128,783	11% (3.23/10)	33/100	
Mother!	$30,000,000	$44,516,999	$14,516,999	69% (6.79/10)	75/100	
The Mummy	$125–195 million	$409,231,607	$284,231,607	16% (4.2/10)	34/100	
Pirates of the Caribbean: Dead Men Tell No Tales	$230,000,000	$794,861,794	$564,861,794	29% (4.66/10)	39/100	
Snatched	$40,000,000	$60,845,711	$20,845,711	36% (5.04/10)	45/100	
Transformers: The Last Knight	$217,000,000	$605,425,157	$388,425,157	15% (3.23/10)	27/100	
Unforgettable	$12,000,000	$17,768,012	$5,768,012	26% (3.99/10)	45/100	

== See also ==
- 90th Academy Awards
- 75th Golden Globe Awards
- 71st British Academy Film Awards
- 33rd Independent Spirit Awards
- 24th Screen Actors Guild Awards
- 23rd Critics' Choice Awards
