= Lilo & Stitch (2025 soundtrack) =

Lilo & Stitch (Original Motion Picture Soundtrack)

Film score by Dan Romer
- Released: May 21, 2025
- Recorded: 2024–2025
- Genre: Film soundtrack
- Languages: English, Hawaiian
- Label: Walt Disney
- Producer: Dan Romer

Dan Romer chronology
Death of a Unicorn (2025)	Lilo & Stitch (Original Motion Picture Soundtrack) (2025)	Horsegirls (2025)

Singles from Lilo & Stitch
- 1. "Hawaiian Roller Coaster Ride" Released: May 9, 2025

Lilo & Stitch (Original Motion Picture Soundtrack) is the film score for the 2025 science fiction comedy film Lilo & Stitch, a live-action animated remake of Disney's 2002 animated film of the same name. The soundtrack was released on May 21, 2025, under the Walt Disney Records label, and featured original score composed by Dan Romer, with reworked songs from the original film's soundtrack, including the Elvis Presley songs.

== Background ==
In September 2022, in an interview to Drew Taylor of TheWrap, Alan Silvestri, who composed the original animated film, had stated that while the live action film was under production, he did not have any news regarding his involvement, but indicated on returning for the sequel. However, in February 2025, it was announced that Dan Romer would score the film.

The soundtrack features almost all of the songs from the original film, including the Elvis Presley songs "(You're the) Devil in Disguise", "Hound Dog", "Heartbreak Hotel," "Stuck on You", and "Suspicious Minds" and a new cover of "Burning Love" produced by Bruno Mars and performed by his nephews Nyjah Music and Zyah Rhythm. Mark Kealiʻi Hoʻomalu and The Kamehameha Schools Children's Chorus returned to record a retitled version of "He Mele No Lilo" from the original movie called "He Lei Pāpahi No Lilo a me Stitch"; the chorus was conducted by the choir director Lynell K. Bright, who also worked on the animated film and whose son is one of the 2025 film's screenwriters Chris Kekaniokalani Bright. Iam Tongi and the Chorus also recorded a new version of "Hawaiian Roller Coaster Ride", which was featured in the first trailer.

Liliʻuokalani's "Aloha ʻOe," a song featured prominently throughout the animated continuity, returns for the 2025 film in a duet performed by Sydney Agudong and Maia Kealoha as Nani and Lilo respectively. Tia Carrere, who plays Mrs. Kekoa in this film and was the voice of Nani Pelekai in the animated continuity, would later tell Agudong during an interview that the latter's pronunciation of the song's lyrics was more accurate than when Carrere herself performed the song for the 2002 film, claiming that her grandmother "gave [her] the wrong words" to the song before she performed it for that film.

== Release ==
The soundtrack was preceded by the lead single, "Hawaiian Roller Coaster Ride", which was released on May 9, 2025. Tongi and the Chorus performed the song live on the season 23 of American Idol on May 12. Walt Disney Records released the soundtrack album on May 21 through digital streaming platforms. A limited-edition picture disc 10″ vinyl single featuring three of the songs—"He Lei Pāpahi No Lilo a me Stitch", "Hawaiian Roller Coaster Ride" and "Burning Love"—were released on May 23, 2025.

== Track listing ==
All music is composed by Dan Romer, except where noted.

No.	Title	Writer(s)	Performers	Length
1.	"He Lei Pāpahi No Lilo a me Stitch"		Hoʻomalu; The Kamehameha Schools Children's Chorus	2:31
2.	"Hawaiian Roller Coaster Ride"	Alan Silvestri; Mark Kealiʻi Hoʻomalu	Iam Tongi; The Kamehameha Schools Children's Chorus	3:29
3.	"Burning Love"	Dennis Linde	Nyjah Music; Zyah Rhythm	2:47
4.	"Experiment 626"			2:36
5.	"Not a Good Fit"			1:05
6.	"Practically a Kid Yourself"			2:22
7.	"I'm Already in My Room"			1:15
8.	"Send Me an Angel"			2:28
9.	"What a Nice Arm You Have"			0:52
10.	"Earth Studies"			1:42
11.	"How Good's His Hearing?"			1:11
12.	"Yep, He's Perfect"			1:46
13.	"When Things Fall Out of the Sky"			2:06
14.	"This Is Reality"			1:18
15.	"Your Case Has Been Elevated"			1:48
16.	"I Repeat, Code 51"			1:40
17.	"A Hui Hou"			1:35
18.	"Consider Our Deal Terminated"			1:21
19.	"Good Parents"			2:14
20.	"The Empty Chair"			2:18
21.	"He's Not an Animal, He's My Friend"			1:55
22.	"Playtime Is Over"			4:40
23.	"Also Cute and Fluffy"			3:28
24.	"What About Ohana?"			2:20
25.	"We Were Supposed to Grow Up Together"			2:31
26.	"Little and Broken, But Still Good"			2:21
27.	"Nobody Gets Left Behind"			2:30
28.	"Goodnight Sisters"			1:45
29.	"Aloha ʻOe"	Liliʻuokalani	Sydney Agudong; Maia Kealoha	1:19

== Charts ==
Chart performance for Lilo & Stitch (Original Motion Picture Soundtrack)
Chart (2025)	Peak position
Japanese Albums (Oricon)	23
Japanese Combined Albums (Oricon)	45
Japanese Hot Albums (Billboard Japan)	88
UK Compilation Albums (Official Charts)	59
US Kid Albums (Billboard)	5
US Top Soundtracks (Billboard)	16

== Release history ==
Release history and formats for Lilo & Stitch (2025 Original Motion Picture Soundtrack)
Region	Date	Format(s)	Label(s)	Ref.
Various	May 21, 2025	Digital download; streaming	Walt Disney Records	
Various	May 23, 2025	LP	Walt Disney Records	
