= Percy Parke Lewis =

American architect

- Born: August 12, 1885; Pennsylvania
- Died: February 09, 1962; Los Angeles County, California
- Occupation: Architect
- Spouse: Ruth Augusta Lewis

Percy Parke Lewis (1885–1962) was an American architect.

== Biography ==
=== Early life ===
He was born on August 12, 1885, in Pennsylvania.

=== Career ===
- 1930–1931: St. Alban's Episcopal Church located at 580 Hilgard in Westwood, Los Angeles, California.
- 1930–1931: Fox Theater located at 961 Broxton Avenue in Westwood, which is listed as a Los Angeles Historic-Cultural Monument on the Westside.
- 1920: Desmond's (department store), Westwood Village, Los Angeles
- 1935: Chateau Colline located at 10335 West Wilshire Boulevard in Los Angeles, and it was added to the National Register of Historic Places in 2002.
- R.W. House in Los Angeles
- Potter Hardware Company Store in Westwood, Los Angeles.
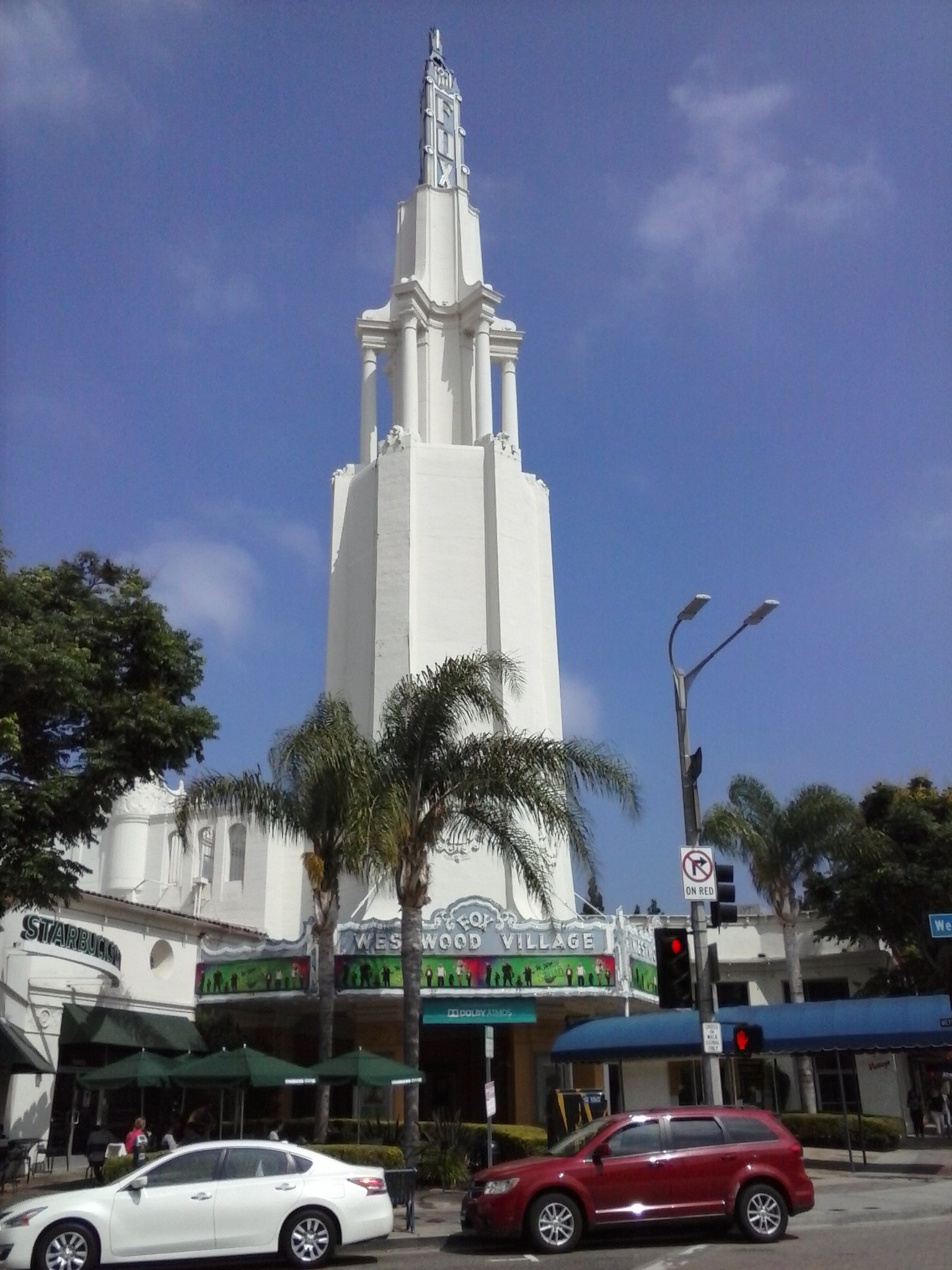
Fox Theater Westwood

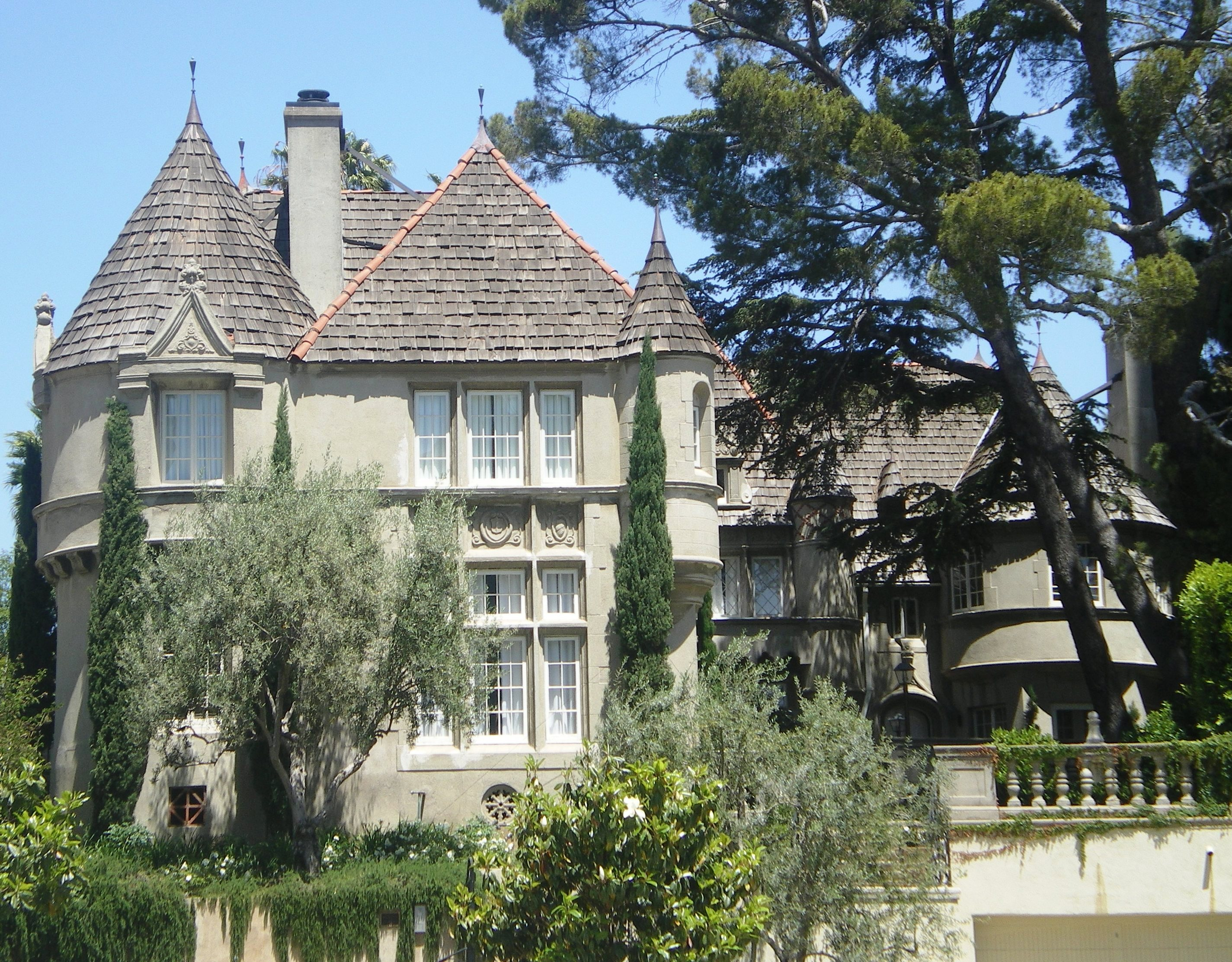
Chateau Colline

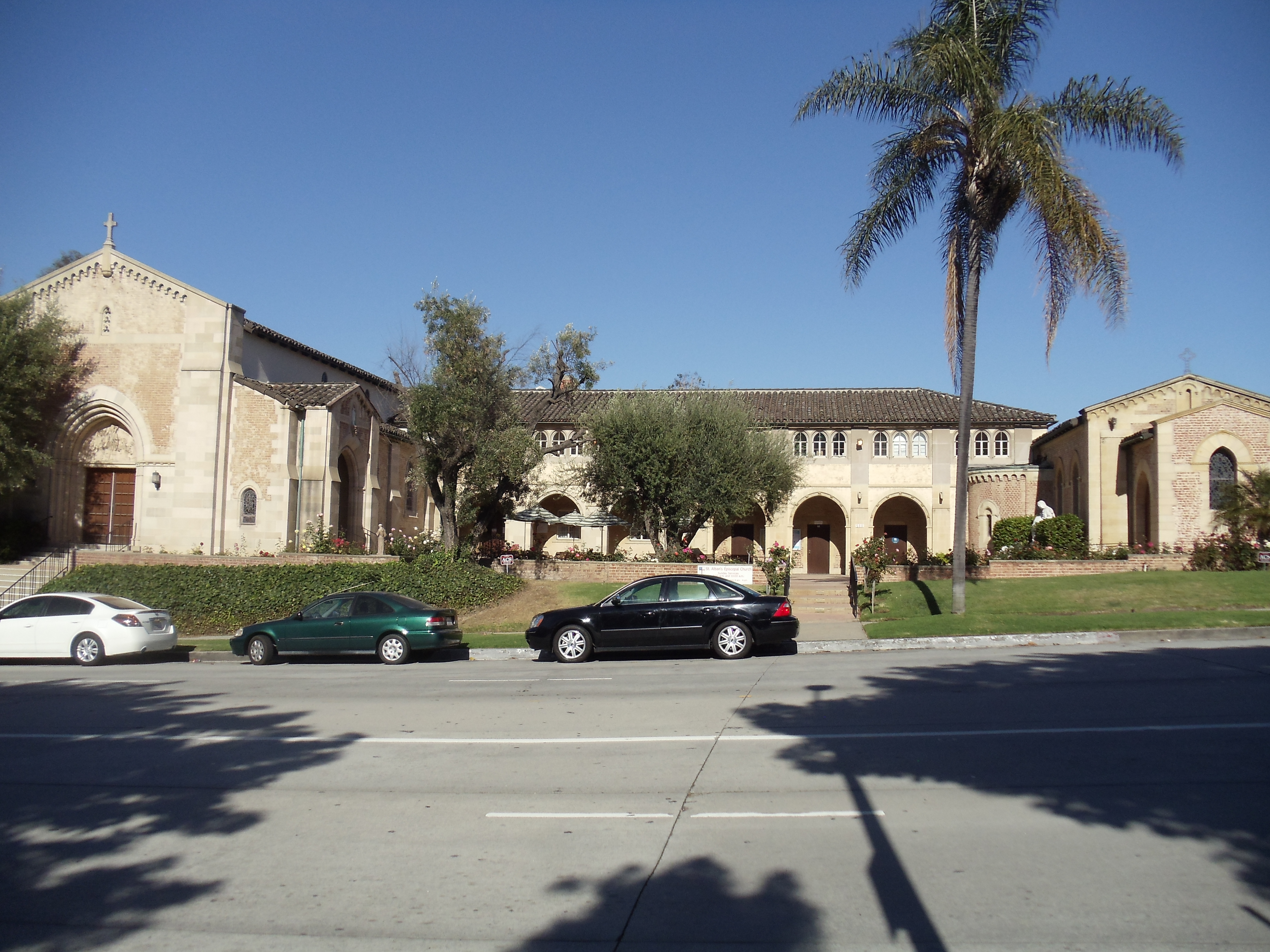
St. Alban's Episcopal Church

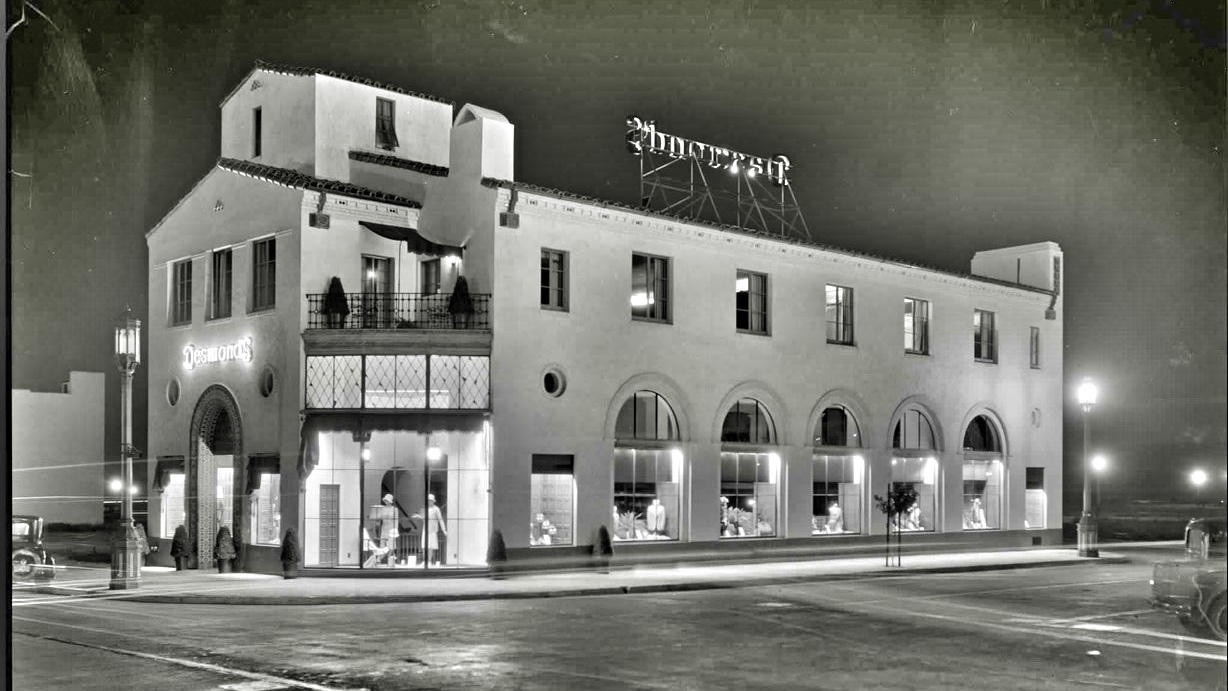
Desmond's Westwood Village (1925)

=== Personal life ===
He married Ruth Augusta Lewis in 1917 in Omaha, Nebraska. He died on February 9, 1962, in Los Angeles County, California.
