= Fox Westwood Village Theater =

Theater in Los Angeles, California, US

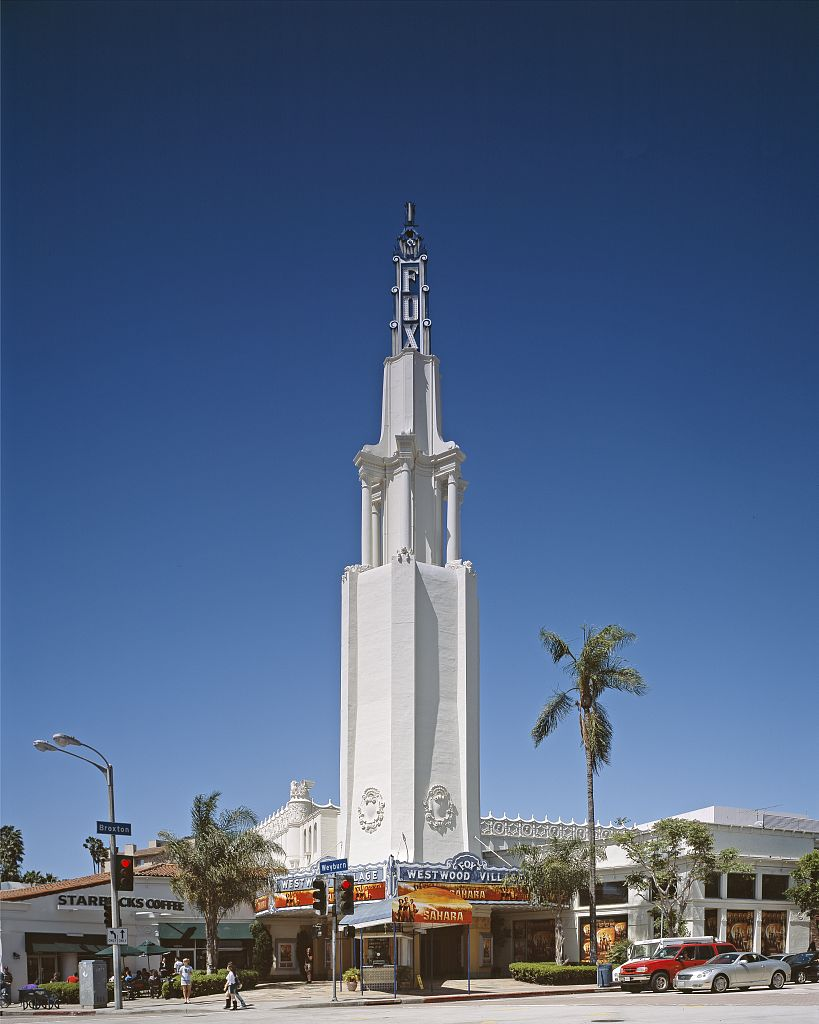

- Location within the Los Angeles metropolitan area
- 34.062684°N 118.447407°W
- Location: 961 Broxton Avenue, Westwood, Los Angeles, California

History
- Built: 1931

Site notes
- Architect: Percy Parke Lewis
- Architectural styles: California Churrigueresque (Spanish Colonial Revival)
- Governing body: Private

Los Angeles Historic-Cultural Monument
- Designated: June 21, 1988
- Reference no.: 362

The Fox Westwood Village Theatre (Note: Previous names for the theater include Regency Village Theatre and Fox Theatre, Westwood Village. The theater has also been referred to as Fox Village Theatre, Westwood Village Theatre and Mann Village Theater.) is a historic theater in Westwood, Los Angeles, California. It is located across the street from the Fox Bruin Theater near the University of California, Los Angeles. The theater has a seating capacity of about 1,400 and has hosted many Hollywood film premieres.

== History ==
Designed in the Spanish Mission style by architect Percy Parke Lewis, the theater was built in 1930 and first opened on August 14, 1931. It was part of a widespread cinema construction program undertaken by Fox West Coast Theatres. The theater is part of Westwood Village, a 1920s Mediterranean-style village development adjoining the University of California Los Angeles, which was planned by Harold and Edwin Janss of the Janss Investment Company.

In the 1940s, the theater's backstage areas were bricked off. The theater was given a Skouras remodel in 1951, adding plaster gold swirls on the stage area side-walls, exit upgrades, new carpet, and lobby upgrades, including California Gold Rush artwork. The theater's capacity was also increased to 1,535.

In 1973, National General Theatres, the former Fox Theatres-West Coast, sold this theater to Mann Theatres. In the late 1970s, new 70mm projection equipment was installed and a larger screen was added.

In 1988, the Fox Theatre was designated by the Los Angeles Cultural Heritage Commission as an Historic Cultural Monument (HCM #362). The theater was remodeled c. 1998-1999.

In 2010, Mann Theatres went out of business and Regency Theatres became the operator of this theater. In 2014, Regency added Dolby Atmos to the theater for the movie Transcendence. In 2019, this theater became the first THX Ultimate Cinema™ theater.

In 2019 it was featured in the film Once Upon a Time in Hollywood

An investor group led by Jason Reitman agreed to buy the theater in February 2024. The group consisted of more than two dozen filmmakers,and a collective of over 30 prominent directors known as the Village Directors Circle including Steven Spielberg, Christopher Nolan, J. J. Abrams, Chris Columbus and Judd Apatow. The group said it planned to add a restaurant, bar, and gallery to the theater, and also to showcase props, wardrobe, and film collections from their personal collections, most notably Columbus's collection of 16mm film prints.

On July 25, 2024, the Regency Village Theater closed after its lease expired. Following a $25 million revival, the theater is set to reopen in 2027 and will be programmed by American Cinematheque.

== Architectural features ==
The theater features a 170-foot white Spanish Revival/Moderne tower which looms over the Broxton and Weyburn Avenues intersection. Atop the tower is a blue and white metal Art Deco “Fox” sign, which was renovated in the late 1980s.

Carved winged lions sit halfway up the tower at the base of projecting columns. A blue and white sign with the legend "Fox Westwood Village" is positioned at the bottom of the tower just above the entrance. By night, the white tower becomes a beacon with its signs and the shaft of the tower illuminated.

The rectangular cinema building immediately behind the tower features long rows of Churrigueresque stucco decorations. Perched atop the corners of the building stand carved griffins.

== Movie premieres ==
Westwood Village hosts about 24 movie premieres per year. Films that debuted at the theater include:

- A Star Is Born (1976)
- Batman (1989)
- JFK (1991)
- Independence Day (1996)
- Mission: Impossible (1996)
- The Matrix (1999)
- The Fast and the Furious (2001)
- Shrek (2001)
- Spider-Man (2002)
- Terminator 3: Rise of the Machines (2003)
- Hellboy (2004)
- Robots (2005)
- Hairspray (2007)
- Cloudy with a Chance of Meatballs (2009)
- The Hangover Part III (2013)
- The Lego Movie (2014)
- Captain Underpants: The First Epic Movie (2017)
- The Emoji Movie (2017)
- Spider-Man: Into the Spider-Verse (2018) and Spider-Man: Across the Spider-Verse (2023)
- Overlord (2018)
- Venom (2018)
- Murder Mystery (2019)
- Bullet Train (2022)
- every Harry Potter film
