= Chateau Colline =

- U.S. National Register of Historic Places
- Los Angeles Historic-Cultural Monument
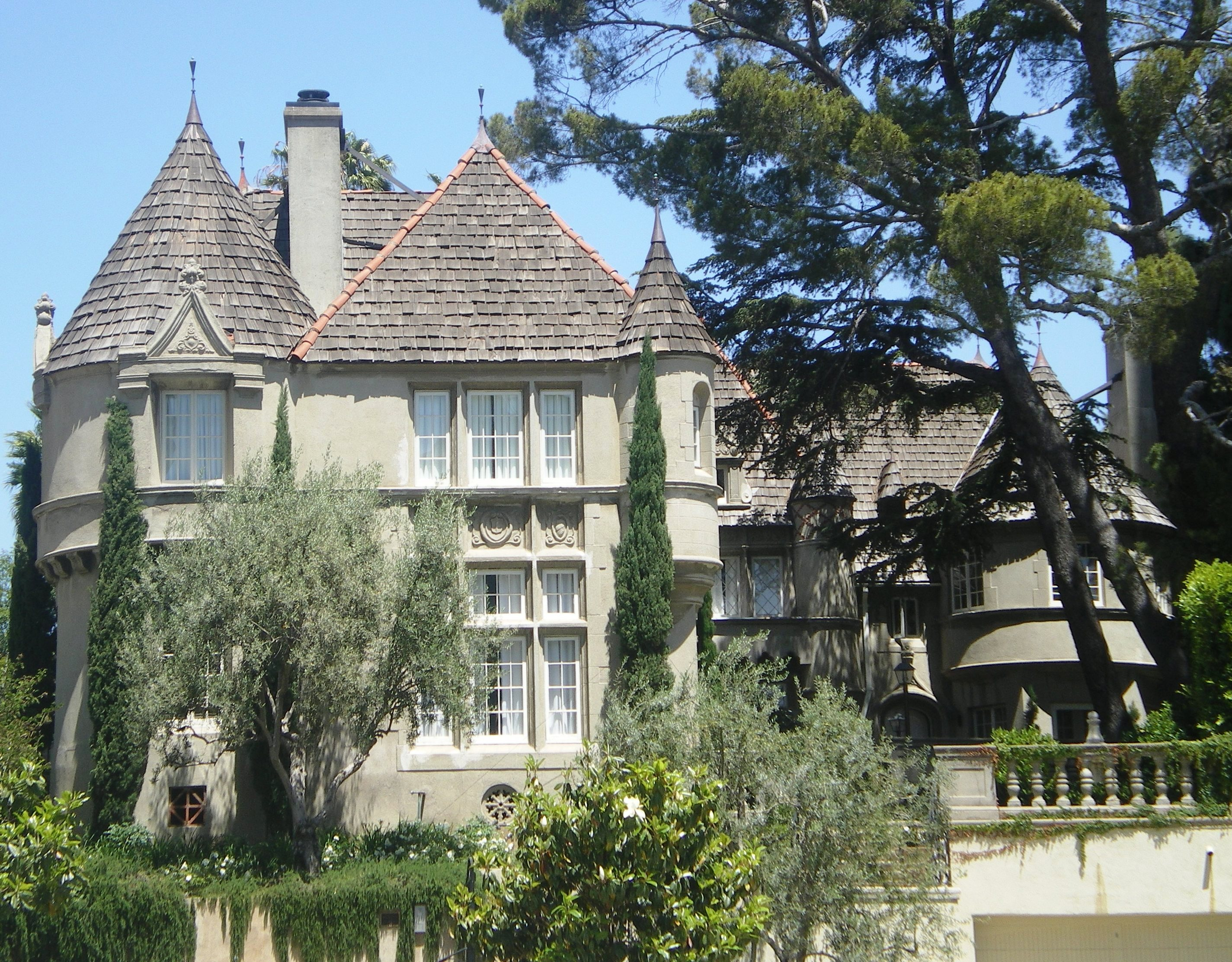
- Chateau Colline, May 2008

- Location within the Los Angeles metropolitan area Location within California Location within the United States
- Location: 10335 Wilshire Blvd., Los Angeles, California
- Coordinates: 34°4′11″N 118°25′36″W
- Built: 1935
- Architect: Percy Parke Lewis
- Architectural style: Late 19th And 20th Century Revivals
- NRHP reference No.: 03000426
- LAHCM No.: 703

Significant dates
- Added to NRHP: May 22, 2003
- Designated LAHCM: July 31, 2001

Chateau Colline is an historic eight-unit apartment building on Wilshire Boulevard in the Westwood section of Los Angeles, California.

== History and characteristics ==
Designed by architect Percy Parke Lewis, Chateau Colline was built in 1935. Its leaded-glass windows, turrets, and climbing vines give it the appearance of a castle. The building also has large wood-burning fireplaces with handcrafted mantels, bakelite intercoms, vaulted ceilings and outside nooks for milk bottles. The Los Angeles Times has reported that rumor has it that "Clark Gable and Bette Davis once lived there, holding lavish parties in a second-story apartment."

== Landmark status ==
In 2001, the owner applied for a permit to demolish the building to build a six-story condominium project in its place. With support from the Los Angeles Conservancy, tenants organized an effort to declare the building an historic monument in order to prevent its demolition. The owner claimed the rent-controlled building had become a financial drain and needed new plumbing and electrical systems. Los Angeles City Councilman Jack Weiss supported the effort to declare the building a historic landmark, calling it a "unique, vital piece of Holmby Hills and Westwood history." The City Council eventually voted 14 to 0 to declare the building a landmark.

Chateau Colline was recognized as a Los Angeles Historic-Cultural Monument (LAHCM #703) by the city Cultural Heritage Commission in 2001 and was listed on the National Register of Historic Places in 2003.

== See also ==
- List of Registered Historic Places in Los Angeles
- List of Los Angeles Historic-Cultural Monuments on the Westside
