= The Emoji Movie =

2017 animated comedy film by Tony Leondis

- Theatrical release poster
- Directed by: Tony Leondis
- Screenplay by: Tony Leondis; Eric Siegel; Mike White
- Story by: Tony Leondis; Eric Siegel
- Based on: Emojis
- Produced by: Michelle Raimo Kouyate
- Starring: T.J. Miller; James Corden; Anna Faris; Maya Rudolph; Steven Wright; Jennifer Coolidge; Jake T. Austin; Christina Aguilera; Sofía Vergara; Sean Hayes; Sir Patrick Stewart
- Edited by: William J. Caparella
- Music by: Patrick Doyle
- Production companies: Columbia Pictures; Sony Pictures Animation
- Distributed by: Sony Pictures Releasing
- Release dates: July 23, 2017 (Regency Village Theatre); July 28, 2017 (United States)
- Running time: 86 minutes
- Country: United States
- Language: English
- Budget: $50 million
- Box office: $217.8 million

The Emoji Movie is a 2017 American animated comedy film based on emojis. It features the voices of T.J. Miller, James Corden, Anna Faris, Maya Rudolph, Steven Wright, Jennifer Coolidge, Jake T. Austin, Christina Aguilera, Sofía Vergara, Sean Hayes, and Patrick Stewart. The film centers on a multi-expressional emoji, Gene (Miller), who exists in a digital city called Textopolis, for a smartphone owned by Alex (Austin), embarking on a journey to become a normal emoji capable of only a single expression, accompanied by his friends, Hi-5 (Corden) and Jailbreak (Faris). During their travels through the other apps, the trio must save their world from total destruction before it is reset for functionality.

Produced by Sony Pictures Animation, the film was directed by Tony Leondis from a screenplay he co-wrote with Eric Siegel and Mike White. Inspired by Leondis' love of Toy Story (1995), the film was fast tracked into production in July 2015 after a bidding war and the project was announced in April 2016. Most of the lead cast members were hired throughout the rest of the year. It had a production time of two years, shorter than most other animated films. The marketing of the film drew a negative response from the public and an internet backlash before the film's release.

The Emoji Movie held its premiere at the Regency Village Theatre on July 23, 2017, before being released in the United States on July 28 by Sony Pictures Releasing through its Columbia Pictures label. While it was a box-office success, grossing $218 million worldwide against a $50 million budget, it received overwhelmingly negative reviews from critics, and is widely considered one of the worst animated films of all time. At the 38th Golden Raspberry Awards, the film won four of its five nominations, including Worst Picture, making it the first animated film to win in its respective categories.

== Plot ==
Gene is an emoji that lives in Textopolis, a digital city inside the smartphone of high school student Alex. He is the son of two meh emojis named Mel and Mary and, unlike other emojis, is able to make multiple expressions, which makes him an outcast. His parents are hesitant about him going to work, but Gene insists so that he can feel useful.

Upon receiving a text message from his love interest Addie McCallister, Alex decides to send her an emoji. Once selected, Gene panics, sends a bizarre face, and wrecks the text center. He is called in by Smiler, a smiley emoji and leader of the text center, who concludes that Gene is a "malfunction" and therefore must be deleted. Gene is chased by bots. He is rescued by Hi-5, a once-popular emoji who has fallen into disuse and has been relegated to the "Loser Lounge". Hi-5 tells him that he can be fixed if they find a hacker, so the two set off together so that Gene can become a "normal" emoji and Hi-5 can regain his popularity.

Smiler sends more bots to look for Gene when she finds out that he has left Textopolis, as his actions have caused Alex to think that his phone needs to be fixed. Gene and Hi-5 come to a piracy app where they meet a hacker emoji named Jailbreak, who wants to reach Dropbox so that she can live in the cloud. The trio is attacked by Smiler's bots, but escapes into the game Candy Crush. Jailbreak explains that Gene can be fixed in the cloud, and the group goes off into the Just Dance app. While there, Jailbreak confesses she is a princess emoji who fled home after tiring of being stereotyped. They are once again attacked by bots, and their actions cause Alex to delete the Just Dance app. Gene and Jailbreak escape, but Hi-5 is taken along with the app and ends up in the Trash.

Mel and Mary search for their son and have a very lethargic argument. They reconcile in the Instagram app when Mel accidentally shows an enamored face, revealing that he is also a malfunction and explaining Gene's behavior. While traveling through Spotify, Jailbreak admits that she likes Gene the way he is and says he should not be ashamed of himself. The two start to fall in love and Gene debates his choice to change himself. They arrive at the Trash and rescue Hi-5, but get attacked by a bot upgraded with malware. The three disable it and flee to Dropbox where they encounter a firewall they're able to pass using Addie's name as a password to enter the Cloud where Jailbreak prepares to reprogram Gene. He admits his feelings for her but she only wants to venture into the Cloud, unintentionally causing him to revert to his apathetic programming out of heartbreak. The upgraded bot sneaks into the Cloud and captures Gene, prompting Hi-5 and Jailbreak to go after him with a Twitter bird summoned by Jailbreak in her princess form.

As Smiler prepares to delete Gene, Mel and Mary arrive. Mel admits to everyone that he is also a malfunction, prompting Smiler to threaten to delete him as well. Jailbreak and Hi-5 arrive and disable the bot, which falls on top of Smiler. Alex has since taken his phone to a store in hopes that a factory reset performed by technical support would restore his phone's functionality, which would totally destroy Gene's world upon completion. Out of desperation, Gene prepares to have himself texted to Addie, making numerous faces to express himself. Realizing that Addie received a text message from him, Alex cancels the factory reset just as it nearly finishes, saving the emojis and finally getting to speak with Addie, who likes the emoji Alex sent. Gene accepts himself for who he is and is celebrated by all of the other emojis.

In a mid-credits scene, Smiler has been relegated to the "Loser Lounge" while wearing braces during her recuperation.

== Voice cast ==
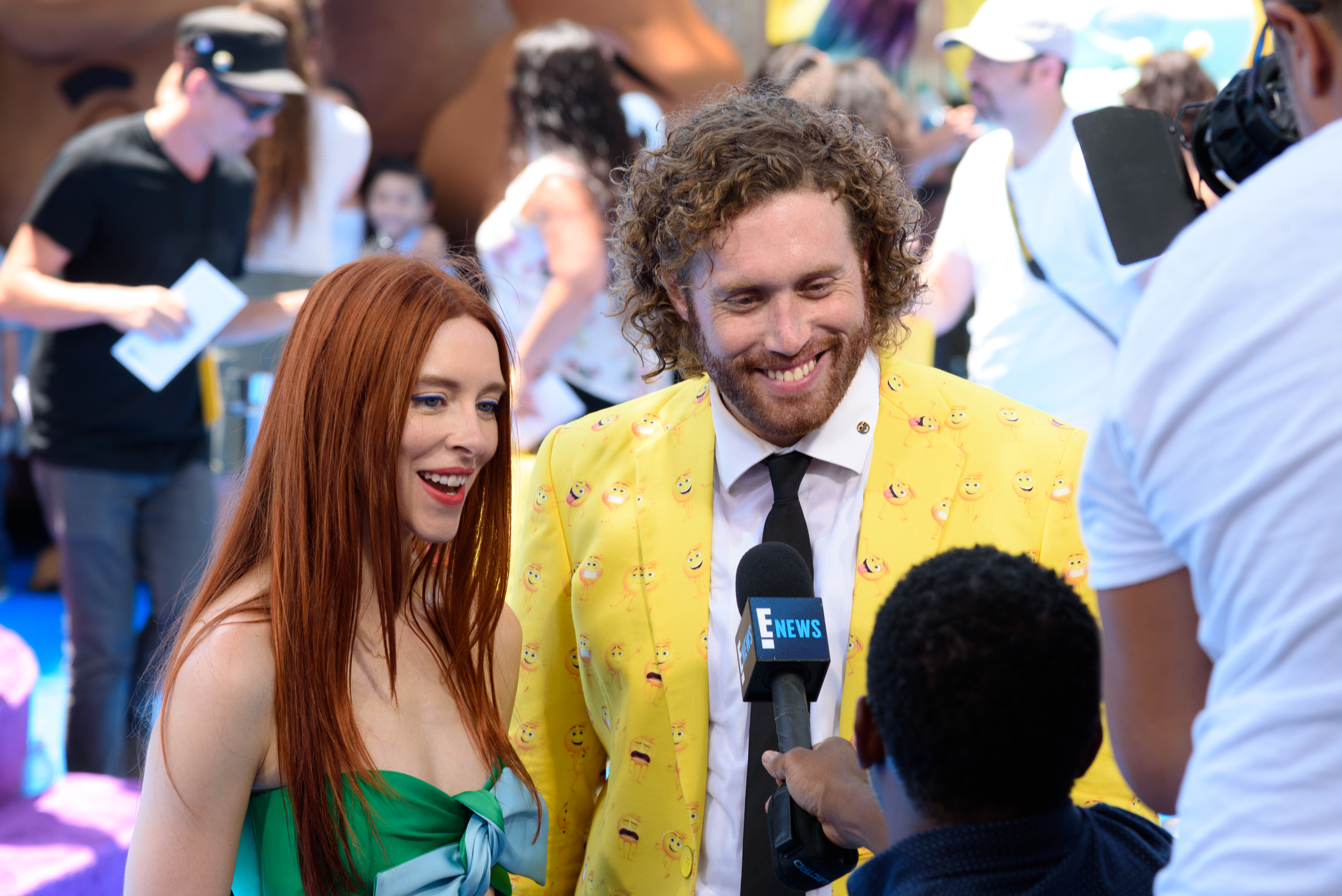
T.J. Miller and his wife Kate at the film's premiere in Westwood, Los Angeles

- T.J. Miller as Gene Meh, an outsider "meh" emoji who can show multiple expressions
- James Corden as Hi-5, a hand emoji representing a high five signal which used to be popular until he was discontinued and relegated to the Loser Lounge with the other discontinued emojis
- Anna Faris as Jailbreak, a hacker emoji encountered in the Piracy App concealed by a Dictionary skin who is later revealed to be a princess emoji named Linda.
- Maya Rudolph as Smiler, a smiley emoji. As the original emoji, she is the systems supervisor of the text center at Textopolis.
- Steven Wright as Mel Meh, Gene's emoji father who is later revealed to have the same multi-expressionist condition as his son
- Jennifer Coolidge as Mary Meh, Gene's emoji mother
- Patrick Stewart as Poop, a well-mannered poop emoji
- Christina Aguilera as Akiko Glitter, a dancer that lives inside the Just Dance app
- Sofía Vergara as Flamenca, a flamenco dancer emoji
- Rachael Ray as Spam, a spam message and patron of the Piracy App
- Sean Hayes as Steven, a devil emoji
- Jake T. Austin as Alex, a young human who owns the phone where Gene and his fellow emojis live
- Tati Gabrielle as Addie McCallister, Alex's love interest
- Jude Kouyate as Poop Jr., the son of Poop
- Jeff Ross as an Internet troll, a patron of the Piracy App
- Hunter March as Hysterical Laughter Emoji
- Tony Leondis as:
  - Laughter, a laughter emoji
  - Broom, a broom emoji who is among those in the Loser Lounge
  - Pizza, a pizza emoji
- Melissa Sturm as:
  - Angel Emoji
  - A phone store employee that Alex enlists to do a factory reset on his phone
- Eric Siegel as Reggie Ramtech, one of the two programmers that select which Emoji to display on a phone
- Sean Giambrone as Travis, a friend of Alex
- Timothy Durkin as Mr. Schoebelen, the teacher of Alex, Addie, and Travis
- Liam Aiken as Ronnie Ramtech, one of the two programmers that select which Emoji to display on a phone
- Wendell Brooks as Ram Tech Bouncer, the bouncer of the text center who only allows approved emojis to enter
- Tarek Bishara as:
  - Fist Bump Emoji
  - Thumbs Up Emoji
- Kevin Chamberlin as Gavel, a gavel emoji
- William Townsend as Rocket Emoji
- Adam Brown as:
  - Flashlight Emoji
  - One of the Trojan soldiers at the Piracy App who helps to direct Gene and Hi-5 to Jailbreak
- Joe Whyte as Red Wagon Emoji
- Conrad Vernon as a Trojan Horse, the bartender of the Piracy App
- William James Caparella as Alien Emoji
- Kate Gorney as Heart Eyes Emoji
- Rich B. Dietel as Nerd Emoji
- Derek Mio as Elephant Emoji
- Paige Eileen Caparella as Cat Heart Eyes Emoji
- Rob Riggle as an ice cream emoji (uncredited)

== Production ==
=== Development ===
The film was inspired by director Tony Leondis' love of Toy Story (1995). Wanting to make a new take on the concept, he and co-creator Eric Siegel began asking themselves, "What is the new toy out there that hasn't been explored?" At the same time, Leondis received a text message with an emoji, which helped him realize that this was the world he wanted to explore. In fleshing out the story, Leondis considered having the emojis visit the real world. However, his producer felt that the world inside a phone was much more interesting, which inspired Leondis to create the story of where and how the emojis lived. As Leondis is gay, he connected to Gene's plight of "being different in a world that expects you to be one thing", and in eventually realizing that the feeling held true for most people, Leondis has said the film "was very personal".

In July 2015, it was announced that Sony Pictures Animation had won a bidding war against Warner Bros. Pictures and Paramount Pictures over production rights to make the film, with the official announcement occurring at the 2016 CinemaCon. The film was fast-tracked into production by the studio after the bidding war. Unlike most other animated films, the film had a production time of two years, as there were concerns that the movie would become outdated due to the evolution of phone technology.

=== Casting ===
On World Emoji Day on July 17, 2016, Miller was announced as the lead. Leondis created the part with Miller in mind, although the actor was initially hesitant to play the role, only accepting after Leondis briefed him on the story. Leondis chose Miller because "when you think of irrepressible, you think of TJ. But he also has this surprising ability to break your heart". In addition, Miller also contributed some re-writes. In October 2016, it was announced that Ilana Glazer and Corden would join the cast as well. Glazer was later replaced by Anna Faris. Jordan Peele stated that he was initially offered the role of "Poop" (a part that would ultimately go to Sir Patrick Stewart), which he said led to his decision to retire from acting.

=== Music ===
The film's score was composed by Patrick Doyle, who previously composed the score for Leondis' Igor (2008). Singer Ricky Reed recorded an original song, "Good Vibrations", for the film. While also voicing a character in the film, Christina Aguilera's song "Feel This Moment" was also used during the film.

== Marketing ==
On December 20, 2016, a teaser trailer for the film was released, which received overwhelming criticism from social media users, collecting almost 22,000 "dislikes" against 4,000 "likes" within the first 24 hours of its release. A second trailer was released on May 16, 2017, which also received an extremely negative reception. Sony promoted the release of the latter trailer by hosting a press conference in Cannes, the day before the 2017 Cannes Film Festival, which featured T.J. Miller parasailing in. Variety called the event "slightly awkward", and The Hollywood Reporter described it as "promotional ridiculousness".

Sony Pictures was later criticized after the film's official Twitter account posted a promotional picture of a parody of The Handmaid's Tale, featuring Smiler. The parody was considered to be "tasteless" due to the overall themes of the work, and the image was deleted afterward.

On July 17, 2017, the Empire State Building was lit "emoji yellow". That same day, director Tony Leondis and producer Michelle Raimo Kouyate joined Jeremy Burge and Jake T. Austin to ring the closing bell of the New York Stock Exchange and Saks Fifth Avenue hosted a promotional emoji red carpet event at its flagship store to promote branded Emoji Movie merchandise.

On July 20, 2017, Sony Pictures invited YouTube personality Jacksfilms to the world premiere and sent him a package containing various Emoji Movie memorabilia including fidget spinners, face masks, and a plushie of the poop emoji. Jacksfilms had sarcastically praised the movie on his YouTube channel four months prior.

== Release ==
The Emoji Movie premiered on July 23, 2017, at the Regency Village Theatre in Los Angeles. It was initially scheduled for release on August 11, but was later moved up to August 4, and finally July 28. In theaters, The Emoji Movie was accompanied by the short film Puppy! (2017) The film, along with DreamWorks Animation's Captain Underpants: The First Epic Movie, were chosen to inaugurate the removal of Saudi Arabia's cinema ban through a double feature screening on January 13, 2018, organized by Cinema 70; they were the first two movies to be given an official public screening in the country in 35 years.

The Emoji Movie was released on 4K Ultra HD Blu-ray, Blu-ray, and DVD on October 24, 2017, by Sony Pictures Home Entertainment. According to The Numbers, the domestic DVD sales are $8,616,759 and the Blu-ray sales are $6,995,654.

== Reception ==
=== Box office ===
The Emoji Movie grossed $86.1 million in the United States and Canada and $131.7 million in other territories, for a worldwide total of $217.8 million, against a production budget of $50 million.

The film was released on July 28, 2017. The Emoji Movie grossed $10.1 million on its first day, including $900,000 from Thursday night previews. The film debuted at second place behind Dunkirk, grossing $25.7 million from 4,075 theaters. Its second weekend earnings dropped by 50% to $12.4 million, and followed by another $6.5 million the third weekend. The Emoji Movie completed its theatrical run in the United States and Canada on November 30, 2017.

Review embargoes for the film were lifted midday July 27, only a few hours before the film premiered to the general public, in a move considered by many to be a tactical attempt to curb bad Rotten Tomatoes ratings. Speaking of the effect embargoing reviews until last minute had on the film's debut, Josh Greenstein, Sony Pictures president of worldwide marketing and distribution, said, "The Emoji Movie was built for people under 18 ... so we wanted to give the movie its best chance. What other wide release with a score under 8 percent has opened north of $20 million? I don't think there is one."

=== Critical response ===
On the review aggregator website Rotten Tomatoes, The Emoji Movie has an approval rating of 6% based on 134 professional reviews, with an average rating of 2.9/10. The website's critics' consensus simply displays a no symbol emoji (🚫) in place of text. Metacritic, which uses a weighted average, assigned The Emoji Movie a score of 12 out of 100 based on 26 critics, indicating "overwhelming dislike", making it the lowest-rated animated film on the site. Audiences polled by CinemaScore gave the film an average grade of "B" on an A+ to F scale.

David Ehrlich of IndieWire gave the film a D, writing: "Make no mistake, The Emoji Movie is very, very, very bad (we're talking about a hyperactive piece of corporate propaganda in which Spotify saves the world and Sir Patrick Stewart voices a living turd), but real life is just too hard to compete with right now." Alonso Duralde of TheWrap was also critical of the film, calling it "a soul-crushing disaster because it lacks humor, wit, ideas, visual style, compelling performances, a point of view or any other distinguishing characteristic that would make it anything but a complete waste of your time". Peter Sobczynski of RogerEbert.com also gave it a negative review, deriding it as a demonstration of artistic abdication at its most venal that is "completely devoid of wit, style, intelligence or basic entertainment value," and concluding that its reliance on "product placement and corporate synergy" results in "as depressing of a film experience as anything to come out this year." Alex Welch of IGN gave it a score of 4.5/10, writing that while it "manages to find some ingenious ways" to explain its premise and benefits from the "talents and charisma of its voice cast," it ultimately reveals itself to be a "misguided and nonsensical" endeavor that "fails to deliver on any of its intended messages or themes" and keeps it from "ever feeling like a worthwhile experience." Sandy Schaefer of Screen Rant gave it a score of 3 out of 10, writing that it "squanders the talents of its capable voice cast" on a "highly derivative" and "backwards and shallow" story that lacks "heart, wit and sense of craftsmanship," concluding that it "comes across as little more than the crass attempt to cash-in on the popularity of smartphone technology."

Glen Kenny of The New York Times described the film as "nakedly idiotic", stating that the film plays off a Hollywood idea that the "panderingly, trendily idiotic can be made to seem less so". Owen Gleiberman of Variety lambasted the film as "hectic situational overkill" and "lazy", writing, "[t]here have been worse ideas, but in this case the execution isn't good enough to bring the notion of an emoji movie to funky, surprising life." Writing in The Guardian, Charles Bramesco called the film "insidious evil" and wrote that it was little more than an exercise in advertising smartphone downloads to children. Reviewers also compared the film unfavorably to Toy Story (1995), Bee Movie (2007), Foodfight! (2012), Wreck-It Ralph (2012), The Lego Movie (2014), Inside Out (2015), and The Angry Birds Movie (2016), among others. (Note: Attributed to multiple references:)

Nigel Andrews of the Financial Times, however, gave the film 3/5 stars, writing: "Occasionally it's as if The Lego Movie is reaching out a long, friendly arm to Inside Out and falling into the chasm between. But the film is inventive too", while Jake Wilson of The Sydney Morning Herald gave the film 4/5 stars, calling it "a rare attempt by Hollywood to come to grips with the online world".

The Emoji Movie is widely considered to be one of the worst films of 2017, and the worst animated film of all time. Screen Rant later placed it at #6 of their 10 Terrible Movies You Don't Have to See to Know They're Bad list. ScreenCrush would put the film at #9 on its list of the 50 worst films released during the 21st century.

=== Accolades ===
At the 38th Golden Raspberry Awards, The Emoji Movie received a nomination for The Razzie Nominee So Rotten You Loved It; and won Worst Picture, Worst Director, Worst Screen Combo, and Worst Screenplay. It became the first animated film to win in any of those categories, as well as the third animated film overall to win a Razzie.

== See also ==
- Postmodernist film
- Internet culture
