= Mark Kealiʻi Hoʻomalu =

Hawaiian musical artist

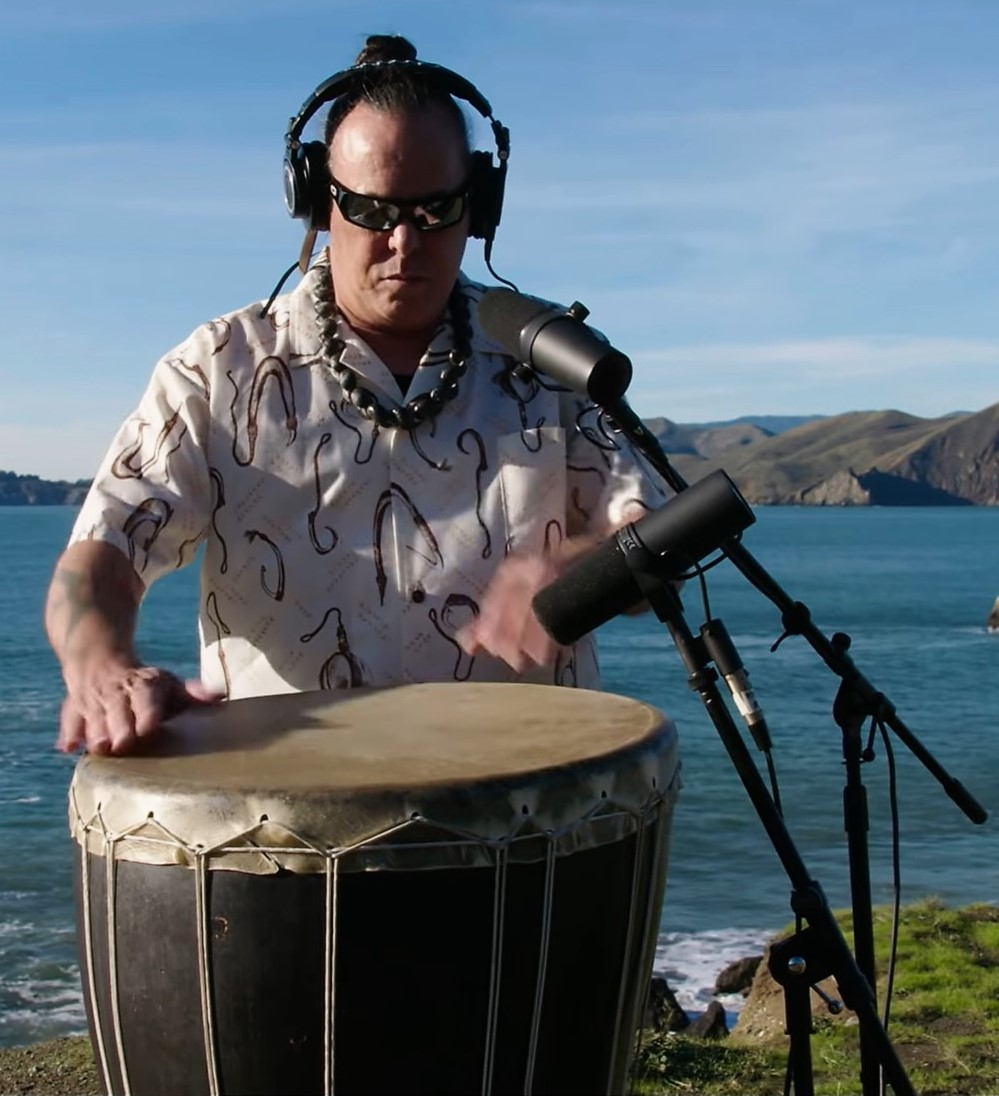
- Ho'omalu performs "This is Me" for the 2020 United States Census

Background information
- Born: August 10, 1959 (age 65)
- Origin: ʻAiea, Oʻahu, Hawaiian Islands
- Genres: Hawaiian
- Occupations: Chanter; composer
- Instrument(s): Vocals, Ipu
- Years active: 1980–present
- Labels: MKH Productions

Mark Kealiʻi Hoʻomalu (born August 10, 1959) is a contemporary Hawaiian chanter, who was born and raised in ʻAiea, Oʻahu. He is best known for his contributions to the soundtrack of the 2002 Disney animated film, Lilo & Stitch, providing the film's two non-Elvis Presley-related songs. His style is both innovative and controversial, as purists disapprove of the liberties he takes in creating new arrangements of ancient chants.

== Career ==
At the age of 15, Hoʻomalu started his hula career with John Piʻilani Watkins doing various lūʻau and Polynesian shows around Oʻahu.

In 1979, he joined a hālau, which became the foundation for Mark's hula education as an ʻolapa and chanter.

Hoʻomalu moved to California in 1979 to teach hula with Tiare Clifford of Tiare Otea in San Francisco. After refining much of his teaching technique under Clifford's direction, he was introduced to Bea and Herb Hew Len. In 1988 they turned over the directorship of their hālau, Nā Mele Hula ʻOhana to Hoʻomalu.

Nā Mele Hula ʻOhana set high standards in hula competitions along the West Coast and in Hawaiʻi. They were invited to the prestigious Merrie Monarch Festival in 1997, where their men placed fourth in the hula kahiko (ancient hula) competition. They returned to the Merrie Monarch each year through 2000. Hoʻomalu disbanded the hālau in early 2002. He continues to teach seminars throughout the country. He was selected to perform at halftime of the 2013 Hawaii Bowl game.

=== Lilo & Stitch ===
In June 2002, Walt Disney Pictures released their animated feature film, Lilo & Stitch, which prominently featured two songs performed by Hoʻomalu along with The Kamehameha Schools Children's Chorus: a traditional song called "He Mele No Lilo (A Song for the Lost)" and an original song written by Hoʻomalu especially for the film, "Hawaiian Roller Coaster Ride".

Hoʻomalu would return to the franchise for the 2025 live-action film, performing a rewritten version called "He Lei Pāpahi No Lilo a me Stitch (A Square Necklace for Lilo and Stitch)" with the Chorus.

=== Academy of Hawaiian Arts ===
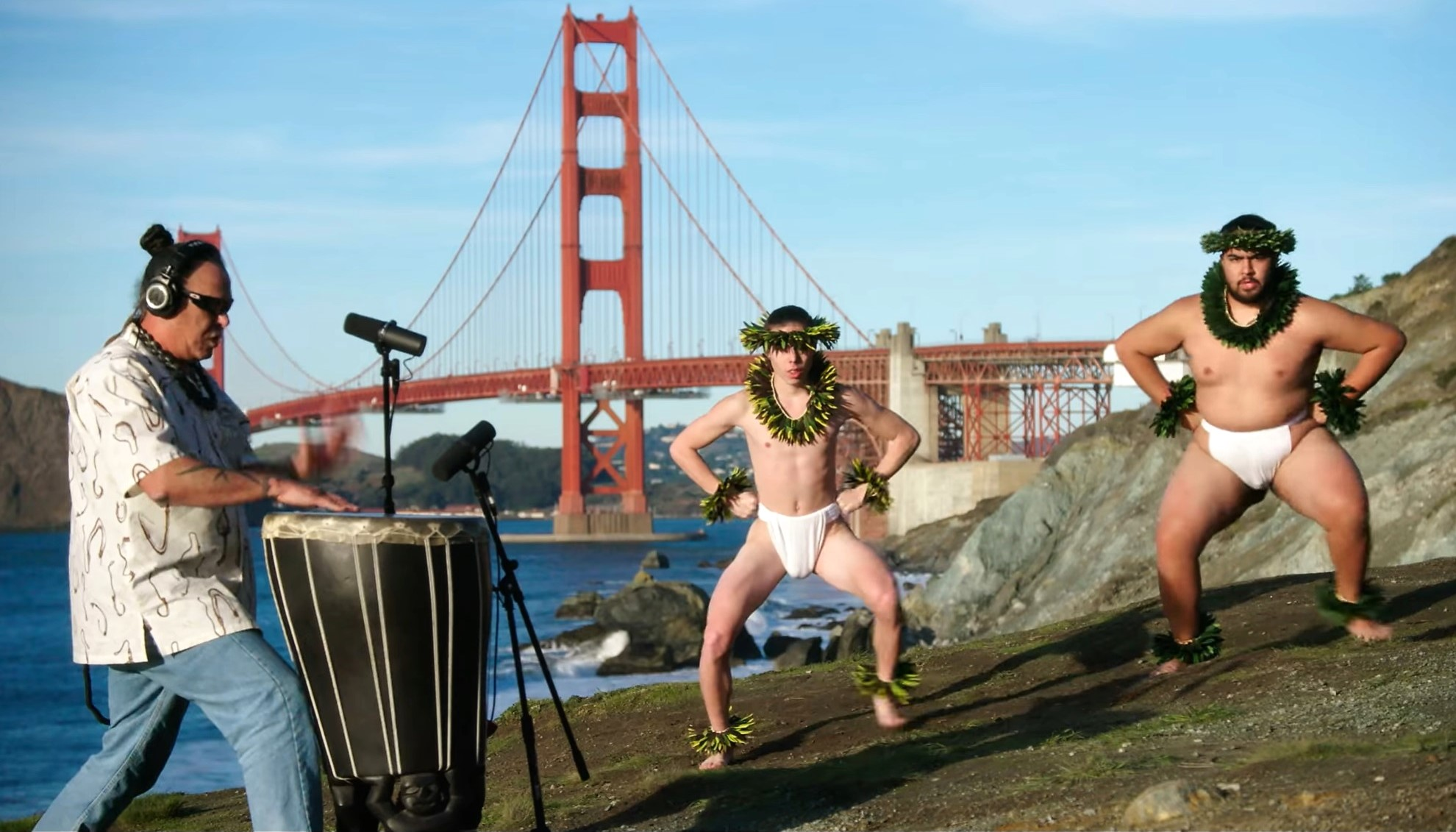
Ho'omalu and dancers from his Academy of Hawaiian Arts perform "This is Me" for the 2020 United States Census in front of the Golden Gate Bridge

In February 2003, he opened a new halau, the Academy of Hawaiian Arts. The hālau has participated in many events around California, including the Iā ʻOe E Ka Lā Hula Competition in Pleasanton and San Francisco's Aloha Festival. They most recently danced at the prestigious Merrie Monarch Hula Festival in Hilo, Hawaiʻi.

== Discography ==
- Poʻokela Chants (1999)
- Lilo & Stitch: An Original Walt Disney Records Soundtrack (2002), featured on two tracks.
- Call It What You Like… (2003)
- Traditional Limits (2018), stylized as TraditionaLimits.
