= Lilo & Stitch (2002 soundtrack) =

2002 soundtrack album

Lilo & Stitch: An Original Walt Disney Records Soundtrack

Soundtrack album by various artists
- Released: June 11, 2002
- Recorded: 2001–2002
- Studio: Todd AO Scoring Stage
- Genres: Rock; pop; country rock; film score
- Length: 34:47
- Label: Walt Disney
- Producer: Chris Montan (exec.)

Alan Silvestri chronology
Showtime (2002)	Lilo & Stitch: An Original Walt Disney Records Soundtrack (2002)	Stuart Little 2 (2002)

Singles from Lilo & Stitch
- 1. "Can't Help Falling in Love" Released: May 13, 2002

Professional ratings
Review scores
Source	Rating
AllMusic	3/5 stars

Lilo & Stitch: An Original Walt Disney Records Soundtrack is the soundtrack to Disney's 2002 animated science fiction comedy-drama film Lilo & Stitch. Released through Walt Disney Records on June 11, 2002, through CDs, LPs and cassettes, the album contains two original songs from the film written by Mark Kealiʻi Hoʻomalu and composer Alan Silvestri, who also scored the film, and performed by Hoʻomalu and the Kamehameha Schools Children's Chorus. The album also includes five songs from Elvis Presley, and two covers of his songs performed by American singer Wynonna and Swedish group A-Teens. Three of Silvestri's score cues are also included in the album.

On June 23, 2003, the soundtrack album was certified Platinum by the Recording Industry Association of America for sales of 1 million units. On March 17, 2023, the song "Hawaiian Roller Coaster Ride" received Platinum certification from the RIAA for reaching 1 million certified units.

== Development ==
As in almost all Disney animated films, music was considered an important aspect in Lilo & Stitch, to which co-writer and co-director Dean DeBlois admitted, "Music is half of the equation. It does all the heavy lifting emotionally." Alan Silvestri, who was prioritized first on composing the film score, was curious on the sonic landscape and wanted to bring the traditional Hawaiian influence on the songs due to its "very deep, sacred aspect". Lilo & Stitch creator and the film's other writer-director Chris Sanders visited the Virgin Megastore in San Francisco and found two CDs of Hawaiian music. Sanders said, "The African-music section was huge, tons of CDs, but like two in the Hawaiian part. We found out that's because the parameters are very clear as to what you can and can't do with this music. We wanted to orchestrate this music. We wanted to take these Hawaiian themes and make them movie scale."

Silvestri then came across Mark Kealiʻi Hoʻomalu, a Hawaiian music artist who managed a hula studio in the San Francisco Bay Area with hundreds of students. DeBlois considered Hoʻomalu as "rebellious" as he would use the old chants expanding in both melody and harmony and bringing old Hawaiian music to new generation. Silvestri recorded his renditions of the traditional chants which was set to music in such a way that had a cinematic quality in both breadth and scope-wise. Silvestri considered it as an "interesting courtship" as Hoʻomalu did not want their chants to commercially exploited, and the community had been sensitive about outsiders coming in and protecting their culture.

As the film's producer Clark Spencer wanted a children's choir to sing the opening song, the team went to Honolulu to record with the students at the Kamehameha School. The music teacher, Lynell Bright, said that the Chorus learnt one song, "He Mele No Lilo", which was supposed to be recorded during May 2001. However, recording for the song was later delayed to October and then again to December after the September 11 attacks, by which time the Chorus recorded the second original song, "Hawaiian Roller Coaster Ride". The choir consisted of 15 to 20 students, with Bright serving as the choir director and playing the piano, and Hoʻomalu's nephew was also involved in the choir.

Sanders was a fan of Elvis Presley and included some of Presley's music in the narrative, establishing title character Lilo Pelekai as a big fan of the singer. However, Sanders found it challenging to get the licensing of Presley's songs until representatives of the Presley estate came out to look at the storyboards and liked it, resulting in their approval. Two of his songs—"Burning Love" and "Can't Help Falling in Love"—were covered by American singer Wynonna and Swedish group A-Teens, with the former cover used during the film's epilogue montage and the latter used during the end credits. "Baby You Belong" by Faith Hill was used as the theme song in the Japanese version. In North America, the song was simply a track from her album Cry with no connotation to the film.

== Track listing ==
No.	Title	Writer(s)	Performers	Length
1.	"Hawaiian Roller Coaster Ride"	Alan Silvestri; Mark Kealiʻi Hoʻomalu	Hoʻomalu; The Kamehameha Schools Children's Chorus	3:28
2.	"Stuck on You"	Aaron Schroeder; J. Leslie McFarland	Elvis Presley	2:25
3.	"Burning Love"	Dennis Linde	Wynonna Judd	3:10
4.	"Suspicious Minds"	Mark James	Presley	3:23
5.	"Heartbreak Hotel"	Mae Boren Axton; Tommy Durden; Presley	Presley	2:13
6.	"(You're the) Devil in Disguise"	Bill Giant; Bernie Baum; Florence Kaye	Presley	2:30
7.	"He Mele No Lilo"	Silvestri; Hoʻomalu	Hoʻomalu; The Kamehameha Schools Children's Chorus	2:28
8.	"Hound Dog"	Jerry Leiber and Mike Stoller	Presley	2:27
9.	"Can't Help Falling in Love"	Hugo Peretti; Luigi Creatore; George David Weiss	A-Teens	3:07
10.	"Stitch to the Rescue" (score)	Silvestri	Silvestri	5:57
11.	"You Can Never Belong" (score)	Silvestri	Silvestri	3:56
12.	"I'm Lost" (score)	Silvestri	Silvestri	4:43

Asian Special Edition
No.	Title	Writer(s)	Performers	Length
13.	"Can't Help Falling in Love (Mandarin Version)"	Peretti; Creatore; Weiss	F4

== Charts ==
=== Weekly charts ===
Weekly chart performance for Lilo & Stitch: An Original Walt Disney Records Soundtrack
Chart (2002)	Peak position
Australian Albums (ARIA)	9
Austrian Albums (Ö3 Austria)	44
Canadian Albums (Billboard)	42
German Albums (Offizielle Top 100)	80
US Billboard 200	11
US Soundtrack Albums (Billboard)	1

=== Year-end charts ===
Year-end chart performance for Lilo & Stitch: An Original Walt Disney Records Soundtrack
Chart (2002)	Position
US Billboard 200	151
US Soundtrack Albums (Billboard)	10
Chart (2003)	Position
US Soundtrack Albums (Billboard)	13

== Certifications ==
Certifications and sales for Lilo & Stitch: An Original Walt Disney Records Soundtrack
Region	Certification	Certified units/sales
Australia (ARIA)	Gold	35,000^{^}
United States (RIAA)	Platinum	1,000,000^{^}
^{^} Shipments figures based on certification alone.

Certifications and sales for "Hawaiian Roller Coaster Ride"
Region	Certification	Certified units/sales
United States (RIAA)	Platinum	1,000,000^{‡}
^{‡} Sales+streaming figures based on certification alone.

== Accolades ==
Awards and accolades received by Lilo & Stitch: An Original Walt Disney Records Soundtrack
Award	Category	Nominee(s)	Result	Ref.
American Music Awards	Top Soundtrack	Lilo & Stitch: An Original Walt Disney Records Soundtrack	Nominated	
Annie Awards	Outstanding Achievement for Music in a Feature Production	Alan Silvestri	Nominated	

== See also ==
- Lilo & Stitch (2025 soundtrack)
