= Tony Leondis =

American film director and animator

- Born: Anthony Leondis; New York City, U.S.
- Education: Hellenic College
- Occupations: Animator, storyboard artist, voice actor, filmmaker
- Years active: 1997–2017
- Notable work: Lilo & Stitch 2: Stitch Has a Glitch, Igor, Kung Fu Panda: Secrets of the Masters, The Emoji Movie

Anthony Leondis is an American former animator, storyboard artist, filmmaker, and voice actor, known for directing The Emoji Movie, Lilo & Stitch 2: Stitch Has a Glitch, and Igor.

== Career ==
Tony Leondis was at CalArts for a time, and had the opportunity to enter the industry thanks to his then professor Brenda Chapman, who offered him an internship to work on one of her films, The Prince of Egypt. After about 6 months, Leondis ended up working as a story artist on that film full-time.

Leondis started his career as a story artist working on films such as The Prince of Egypt and The Lion King II: Simba's Pride. He later joined DisneyToon Studios, where he co-wrote the script for Kronk's New Groove. Leondis made his directorial debut on Lilo & Stitch 2: Stitch Has a Glitch in 2005. In 2008, he directed his first theatrical animated film, Igor, for Exodus Film Group.

Since 2009, he was directing at DreamWorks Animation an animated feature film about ghosts. Leondis originally pitched the film as a school story called BOO U, but during development over the next few years, the plot would be drastically changed. Leondis went on to direct the Kung Fu Panda short Secrets of the Masters. Finally, in 2012, his ghost film, now called B.O.O. Otherworldly Operations Office took its apparent final form and entered pre-production. Leondis also directed this version of the film, alongside Ryan O'Loughlin, who became co-director.

Now titled B.O.O.: Bureau of Otherworldly Operations, based on Leondis's original idea, the film was scheduled to be released in 2015, but by late 2014, it was pulled from DWA's schedule and went back into restructuring. However, due to the failures that DreamWorks suffered during 2013 and 2014, added to the doubts that the studio was having about the film, they ended up causing the studio to decide to avoid another failure and ended up scrapping the film, in addition to closing Leondis's studio Pacific Data Images, which was helping to animate the film. It was reported that when this studio was closed, the production of B.O.O. ceased. According to reports, the film had 60% advanced animation when it was cancelled. By 2015, Leondis left DreamWorks to develop his next animated film.

=== The Emoji Movie ===
In 2017, Leondis directed and co-wrote Sony Pictures Animation's animated film The Emoji Movie. Leondis pitched the film to the studio and co-wrote it with Eric Siegel. According to a producer named Tripp Vinson, Leondis stated that several studios thought that Emoji Movie had the potential to become a multi-film franchise.

According to statements by Leondis, Emoji Movie had a very rushed production once Sony began producing it, supposedly because Sony knew how quickly cell phones evolved and they did not want the film to be outdated also because by not having the rights, any studio could make an emoji movie before them. As they said, they had such a drastic time limit that they hardly had time to test whether the film worked or not. The film was released on July 28, 2017. Though the film was a box-office success, it was panned by critics, with many considering it to be one of the worst movies ever made. He won two Razzie Awards for Worst Director and Worst Screenplay, the latter shared with Eric Siegel and Mike White, making Leondis the first animation director in motion picture history to win those categories. Despite showing interest in live-action filmmaking, Leondis has not been active in the entertainment industry since, but continues to make public appearances occasionally as of June 2022, with his most recent appearance being at the 75th Primetime Emmy Awards.

== Personal life ==
Leondis is of Greek descent and the son of a Greek Orthodox priest. He is gay.

== Filmography ==
=== Film ===
Year	Title	Director	Writer	Animation department	Story artist	Voice actor	Role	Notes
1998	The Lion King II: Simba's Pride	No	No	Yes	No	No		Direct-to-video; Additional character designer
1998	The Prince of Egypt	No	No	No	Yes	No		
2000	The Road to El Dorado	No	No	No	Additional	No		
2004	Home on the Range	No	No	No	Yes	No		
2005	Lilo & Stitch 2: Stitch Has a Glitch	Yes	Yes	No	No	No		Direct-to-video
2005	Kronk's New Groove	No	Story	No	No	No		Direct-to-video
2008	Igor	Yes	No	No	No	Yes	Killiseum Fan #4	Additional screenplay material
2011	Kung Fu Panda: Secrets of the Masters	Yes	No	No	No	Yes	Master Croc	Video short
2017	The Emoji Movie	Yes	Yes	No	No	Yes	Laughter, Broom, Pizza	Golden Raspberry Award for Worst Director winner

=== Television ===
Year	Title	Special thanks	Notes
1997	Cartoon Sushi	Yes	Episode #1.4

== Awards and nominations ==
Ceremony	Film/TV Show	Category	Year	Result
Razzie Awards	The Emoji Movie	Worst Director	2018	Won
Razzie Awards	The Emoji Movie	Worst Screenplay	2018	Won
Annie Awards	Kronk's New Groove	Best Writing In An Animated Feature Production	2006	Nominated
DVD Exclusive Awards	Lilo & Stitch 2: Stitch Has a Glitch	Best Director (of a DVD Premiere Movie)	2006	Nominated
DVD Exclusive Awards	Lilo & Stitch 2: Stitch Has a Glitch	Best Screenplay (for a DVD Premiere Movie)	2006	Nominated
