= Western Jewish History Center =

The Western Jewish History Center existed as part of the Judah L. Magnes Museum in Berkeley, California, from 1967 to 2010. It is now the Magnes Collection of Jewish Art and Life, administered as part of the Bancroft Library, University of California, Berkeley.

Primary source materials, consisting of more than 500 archival collections, include the papers and artifacts of Jewish families and individuals such as Judah L. Magnes; Adolph Sutro; David and Simon Lubin; Rosalie Meyer Stern; Julius Kahn; Florence Prag; Flora Arnstein; Ernest Bloch; Lloyd Dinkelspiel; Robert Levinson; Harris Weinstock; Ruth Carol Silver; Benjamin Swig; Rhoda and Richard Goldman; Alfred Henry Jacobs; members of the Haas, Koshland, Gerstle, Sloss, and Lilienthal families; and many others. Many of these take the form of family letters, diaries, photographs, and scrapbooks.

In addition, the archive also holds the papers and artifacts of important Jewish organizations such as San Francisco's Emanu-El, Beth Israel-Judea, Sherith Israel, and Ohabai Shalome synagogues; Oakland's Congregation Sinai; Berkeley's Aquarian Minyan, and Lafayette's Isaiah.
