= Prentis Cobb Hale =

American entrepreneur (1910-1996)

Prentis C. Hale

Prentis Cobb Hale Jr. (July 30, 1910 – February 16, 1996) was an American entrepreneur.

The son of Prentis Cobb Hale I, who with two brothers, founded Hale Brothers & Co. Inc., in Sacramento, California in 1881. Prentis Hale Jr. earned a bachelor's degree in 1933 and an LL.B. in 1936, both at Stanford University. He was admitted to the California Bar in 1936.

In 1936, he began his business career as a stock clerk working in the basement of the family business, Hale Bros. Stores. By 1948, he was the company's president. Hale Bros merged with Los Angeles–based Broadway Department Stores to form Broadway-Hale Stores Inc. He was chairman of the new company from 1950 to 1972. Edward W. Carter (1911–1996) succeeded Hale in the post, followed by Philip M. Hawley. The company, later known as Carter Hawley Hale Stores Inc., owned the Emporium, Weinstock's and The Broadway, as well as Neiman-Marcus, prior to its two famous bankruptcies.

He was also a vice president of the Bank of America and a member of the Bohemian Club. He died in San Francisco on February 16, 1996.

When the 1960 Winter Olympics were held in Squaw Valley, California, Hale served as President of the Olympic Organizing Committee.

He had four children with his first wife, Marialice King Hale, who died by suicide in March 1969. He later married Denise Minnelli, the former wife of director Vincente Minnelli.

Preceded by (Italy) Enrico Colli	President of Organizing Committee for Winter Olympic Games; 1960	Succeeded by (Austria) Bruno Kreisky
