= Simon J. Lubin =

American businessman and political activist

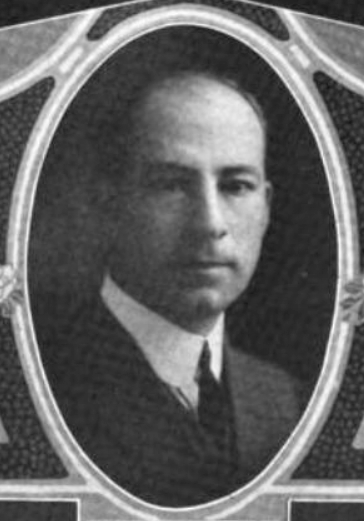
- Born: Simon Julius Lubin; 1876; Sacramento, California, U.S.
- Died: April 15, 1936 (aged 59–60); San Francisco, California, U.S.
- Education: Harvard University
- Occupation: Businessman
- Spouse: Rebecca Cohen
- Children: 1 son, 2 daughters
- Parent: David Lubin
- Relatives: Harris Weinstock (half-uncle)

Simon Julius Lubin (1876 – April 15, 1936) was an American businessman and political activist. He served as the president of Lubin and Weinstock, "the largest department store in Sacramento, California", from 1920 to 1930. He served as the president California Commission on Immigration and Housing from 1912 to 1923, where he improved the living conditions of immigrant workers.

== Early life ==
Simon J. Lubin was born in 1876 in Sacramento, California. His father, David Lubin, and his half-uncle, Harris Weinstock, co-founded Lubin and Weinstock, "the largest department store in Sacramento, California".

Lubin was educated at the Sacramento High School, graduating in 1895. He received a bachelor of arts degree from Harvard University in 1903. Shortly after college, he did social work in housing in Boston and New York City.

== Career ==
Lubin served as the vice president of Lubin and Weinstock from 1916 to 1920, and as its president from 1920 to 1930.

Lubin was active in the California Republican Party. He served on the National Labor Board. Additionally, he served as the president of the California Commission on Immigration and Housing from 1912 to 1923. He was also a member of the Academy of Political Science, the Taylor Society, and the American Association for Labor Legislation.

At the same, Lubin was accused by the Better America Federation of "aiding" the Industrial Workers of the World. However, Paul Groth, a Professor Emeritus of Architecture and Geography at the University of California, Berkeley, suggests Lubin's intention in improving the living conditions of workers was to foster a more productive workforce. Moreover, Groth adds that Governor Hiram Johnson took Lubin's work seriously in light of the fact that the construction of the Panama Canal would inevitably lead to higher immigration levels from Eastern Europeans looking for work.

Lubin served as the president of the Pan-American Institute of Reciprocal Trade.

== Personal life, death and legacy ==
Lubin married Rebecca Cohen. They had a son, David, and two daughters, Ruth and Miriam.

Lubin was a member of the Harvard Club of New York, the Harvard Club of San Francisco, the Sutter Country Club and the Del Paso Country Club.

Lubin died on April 15, 1936, at the Letterman General Hospital in San Francisco, California. In 1938, the Simon J. Lubin Society published Their Blood Is Strong by John Steinbeck. His papers are in the collection of the Magnes Collection of Jewish Art and Life at the Bancroft Library in Berkeley, California.
