= Harris Weinstock =

American businessman

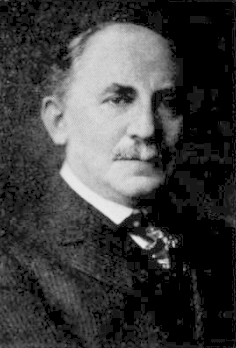
- Born: September 18, 1854; London, U.K.
- Died: August 22, 1922 (aged 67); Palo Alto, California, U.S.
- Occupation: Businessman
- Spouse: Barbara Felsenthal
- Children: 2 sons, 2 daughters
- Relatives: David Lubin (half-brother); Simon J. Lubin (half-nephew)

Harris Weinstock (1854–1922) was an American businessman. He was the co-founder of Lubin and Weinstock department store in Sacramento, California. As the founding State Market Commissioner, he oversaw regulations and marketing for the citrus, poultry and fishing industries in California. He was a founder of the Commonwealth Club of California.

== Early life ==
Harris Weinstock was born to a Jewish family on September 18, 1854, in London, England. He emigrated to the United States at the age of one, settling in New York City, where his father was a businessman. He was educated in New York, and he moved to California in 1869.

== Career ==
With his half-brother David Lubin, he opened a drygoods store in San Francisco, California, in 1872. They subsequently co-founded Lubin and Weinstock, a department store in Sacramento, California, later known as Weinstock's. He was also an investor in the Weinstock, Lubin Real Estate Company; the Weinstock, Nichols Company; and the National Bank of D. O. Mills.

Weinstock served in the National Guard from 1881 to 1895, retiring as Colonel. Meanwhile, he joined the board of trustees of the California State Library in 1887. Seven years later, in 1895, he joined the State Board of Horticulture.

Weinstock became a freeholder of Sacramento in 1891. In 1913, he was appointed to the Commission on Industrial Relations by President Woodrow Wilson. He also served on the executive committee of the National Civic Federation, which attempted to alleviate conflict between employers and labor unions. He was subsequently appointed to the State Industrial Accident Commission.

Weinstock was elected the first President of the Commonwealth Club of California in 1903.

Weinstock drafted the Weinstock Arbitration Bill of 1911, which prohibited strikes and lockouts during the arbitration process.

In 1912, Weinstock was appointed by Governor Hiram Johnson to investigate the San diego free speech fight.

By 1915, Weinstock was appointed as first director of the State Market Commission of California. As Commissioner, Weinstock imposed regulations on the citrus and poultry industries, ensuring that farmers were paid their fair share and helping the industries with marketing. He also established the State Fish Exchange. He resigned in January 1920.

Weinstock served as the vice president of the Jewish Publication Society. He was also a member of the Jewish Historical Society.

== Personal life and death ==
Weinstock married Barbara Felsenthal. They had two sons, Robert Weinstock and Walter Weinstock, and two daughters, Mrs Samuel Frankenheimer of Stockton, California, and Mrs Burton E. Towne of Lodi, California.

Weinstock fell from his horse while riding near Los Altos, California, in August 1922. He died of a skull fracture at the nearby hospital in Palo Alto, California on August 22. By the time of his death, he was worth an estimated US$500,000. His wife inherited his estate.

== Works ==
- Weinstock, Harris (1902). Jesus the Jew and Other Addresses. New York: Funk & Wagnalls. OCLC 861841.
- Weinstock, Harris (1909). Strikes and Lockouts.
