= International Institute of Agriculture =

Agriculture institution founded in Rome

The International Institute of Agriculture (IIA) was the first organization to systematically produce and exchange global data on crops, cultivated land, and trade flows. The late 19th century called for a demand in worldwide data on production, stocks, and consumption, as a rise in agricultural commoditities emerged in global markets. Private actors and services attempted to step in to address these gaps that were present in the agricultural field, but could not fulfill these issues. As a result, governments created the IIA to provide public international statistics, in response to these previous challenges. Their reports on crops and evaluations on international production became crucial components to analyze the global economy and universal agricultural data analytics. After World War II, it was replaced by the Food and Agriculture Organization (FAO) of the United Nations.

== History ==
The IIA was founded in Rome in 1905 by the King of Italy Victor Emmanuel III with the intent of creating a clearinghouse for collection of agricultural statistics, in order to be able to compare countries' agricultural output. In 1904, the idea of such an institute came to David Lubin of Sacramento, California, and the creation of the IIA was primarily due to his efforts. His project found favor with the king of Italy, who was convinced to back the creation of an international organization where governments could share new methods and strategies for agricultural purposes and technological advancements in this field. The latter gave a building in Rome and an annual income of $60,000. The king called the first congress in 1906, and delegates attended from 40 countries. At the congress, a treaty was formed making the institute a permanent organization, defining its scope and activities, and setting international standards in agricultural practices and administration.

The IIA's most immediate concern was to create an international centralization initiative to promote the welfare of farmers. Its initial task consisted of gathering annual crop production statistics from nations worldwide, presenting this data as a "single numeric statement," which indicated the year's anticipated harvests as a percentage of the previous year's harvests.

In 1930, the IIA published the first world agricultural census. After World War II, both its assets and mandate were handed over to the Food and Agriculture Organization (FAO) of the United Nations.

== Main Actors - Italian Government ==
The idea for the establishment of an international chamber of agriculture was launched by a campaign from the Italian government, who were looking to unify agriculturalists beyond national borders. The main driving forces of the global agricultural revolution, occurring in the second half of the 19th century, were factors such as growth in global trade, decrease in transportation costs, crops and natural resources, and new opportunities in result of an overseas circulation of labor. All of these agricultural components influenced rural transformation and economic expansion, which ultimately led to an urgency in organization of these new dynamics. With the idea of the creation of the IIA in mind, Italy sent diplomats and political experts to mobilize foreign governments in support of the organization's initiative, reinforcing their influence in international relations. Eventually, Italian elites and prominent economists came together to use its transnational networks and expertise to prepare the official report submitted to the Italian government for final approval of the organization. Through promoting and ensuring the success of the newly found international organization, the report was approved, prompting a shift in the communication within the agricultural sector and strengthened the field of foreign policy.

== Main Actors - The Ottoman Empire ==
One of the major contributors who played a significant role in the establishment of the IIA was the Ottoman Empire. In the early activities of the institute, the most active participants were representatives from this region. The contributions and participation from the Ottoman Empire allowed its political officials to assert their position on creating a global standard for data collection, while also broadening their domestic activity and making statistical information of the Ottoman economy available to the public. The Empire's contributions to the formation of the IIA was an influential aspect to their politics due to having an early vote and firm stance on the institute's international standard setting process. Ultimately, the involvement of the Ottoman Empire not only helped build the foundation principles of the IIA, but also connected them to a global network of agricultural bureaucrats, making it easier to exchange and compare data on the international scale.

== Administration ==
The administration of the IIA was vested in the general assembly of delegates from affiliated countries, meeting every two years, and in a permanent executive committee, on which there was one representative from each country. This permanent committee had direct charge of the IIA. The general officers were the president (also chairman of the permanent committee), the vice president and the secretary general.

The work of the institute was divided among four bureaus:

1. Bureau of the secretary general had charge of the personnel, financial and other routine business, the building and its equipment, the printing and distribution of publications, the library and general bibliographical work, and, as a more recent service, the preparation and publication of an annual compilation of agricultural legislation in the different countries of the world.
2. Bureau of general statistics collected, collated and published statistics of production and commerce in agricultural products, both animal and vegetable, throughout the world.
3. Bureau of agricultural intelligence and plant diseases collected and published information regarding the progress of scientific and experimental investigations and practical experience in agriculture throughout the world and, as a branch of this work, gives special attention to the diseases of plants and to entomology.
4. Bureau of economic and social institutions collected and published statistics and general information regarding agricultural co-operation, insurance and credit, together with other matters relating to the economic and social organization of rural communities.

The annual budget of the institute was $250,000 (c. 1915), contributed by the adhering governments on the basis of a number of units assigned to each country.

== Publications ==
Those publications of the IIA which had a bearing on the formation of the price of the staples (such as crop reports and data on exports, imports and stocks) were based exclusively on official information, supplied direct to the institute by the adhering governments. Other publications were produced from (a) information officially communicated by the governments, (b) original articles contributed by eminent authorities designated by the adhering governments, (c) excerpts and abstracts of articles translated from the 2,225 official and unofficial periodical publications of the world received by the IIA.

The IIA printed and published two annuals and three monthly and one weekly bulletins, together with a considerable number of monographs on special subjects. The annuals dealt with agricultural statistics and legislation, respectively. The monthly bulletins were on (a) agricultural statistics (b) agricultural intelligence and diseases of plants, and (c) economic and social institutions, and the weekly bulletin is bibliographical. The monthly bulletins were published in French, German, English, Spanish, Italian and Hungarian. French being the official language of the IIA, the editions in that language were paid for from the funds of the Institute.

Provision for the edition in the other languages was made by the countries interested. The Congress of the United States made an annual appropriation of $5,000 (c. 1915) for translating and printing the English edition, the rest of the expense being borne by Great Britain and her colonies.

== Library ==
The IIA collected a great library of agricultural literature. As the IIA became more firmly established and its value as an international clearing house on economic information was more generally recognized, it was met with a constantly increasing demand for the extension of its service along many lines. After the IIA ceased operations in 1945, its library collection was transferred to David Lubin Memorial Library (DLML) of the FAO. The DLML is open to external visitors. Procedures for library visitors can be found here.

== See also ==
- David Lubin
- Food and Agriculture Organization
