= Broadway Stores =

Former American retailer

Broadway Stores, Inc.
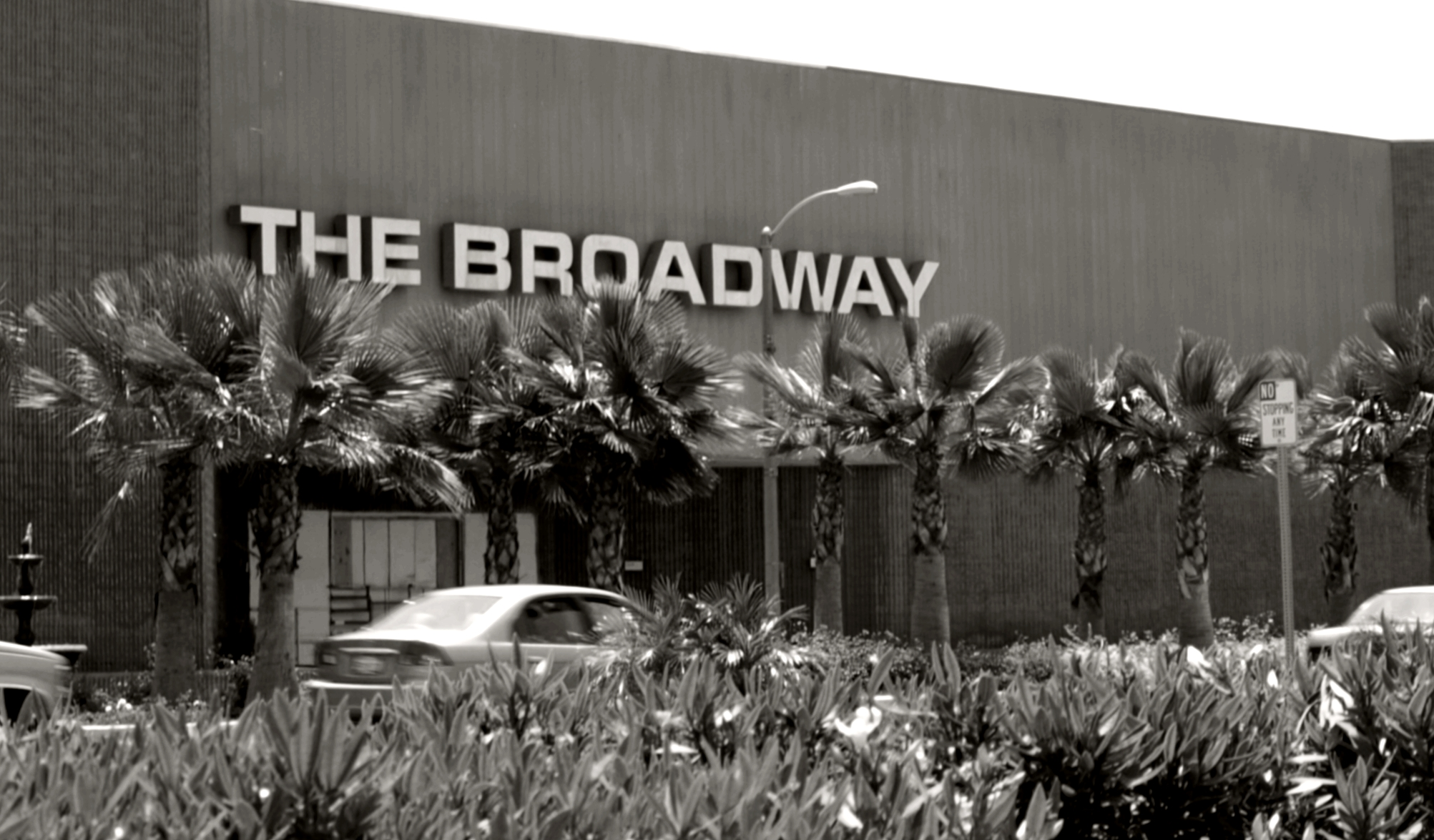
- A former The Broadway department store at the Hawthorne Plaza Shopping Center in Hawthorne, California, in 2010
- Trade name: Broadway Stores
- Formerly: Broadway-Hale Stores (1950–1974); Carter Hawley Hale Stores (1974–1994)
- Type: Public
- Traded as: NYSE: BWY
- Industry: Retail
- Genre: Department Stores
- Predecessor: The Broadway; Hale’s
- Founded: 1950; 76 years ago as Broadway-Hale Stores in Los Angeles
- Founder: Arthur Letts, Sr.
- Defunct: October 12, 1995; 31 years ago
- Fate: Company was sold to Federated Department Stores
- Successor: Macy's
- Headquarters: Los Angeles, California, US
- Area served: United States
- Key people: Edward W. Carter, Prentis C. Hale, Philip M. Hawley
- Number of employees: 20,200 (1995)
- Divisions: The Broadway (1950–1995); Weinstock's (1950–1995); Hale's (1950–1967); Wanamaker's (1978-1987); Emporium-Capwell (1970–1995); Bergdorf Goodman (1972-1987); Holt Renfrew (1971-1986); Waldenbooks (1969-1984); Sunset House (1969-1984); Contempo Casuals (1978-1987); Neiman Marcus (1969-1987)
- Website: None

Broadway Stores, Inc., was an American Holding company of department stores based in Southern California. Known through its history as Carter Hawley Hale Stores and Broadway Hale Stores over time, it acquired other retail store chains in regions outside its California home base and became in certain retail sectors a regional and national retailer in the 1970s and 1980s. The company was able to survive takeover attempts in 1984 and 1986, and also a Chapter 11 bankruptcy filing in 1991 by selling off most of its assets until August 1995 when its banks refused to advance enough additional credit in order for the company to be able to pay off suppliers. At that point, the company sold itself to Federated Department Stores for $1.6 billion (~$3 billion in 2024) with the acquisition being completed on October 12, 1995.

== History ==
=== Early history ===
In 1950, as Los Angeles began to grow in population very rapidly and assumed dominance within the state, the fast-growing The Broadway department stores based there negotiated an all-stock merger with Hale Bros. Stores, Inc. Edward W. Carter, president of The Broadway, became the president of Broadway-Hale Stores.

The newly enlarged company began to grow aggressively with its Broadway stores expanding south to San Diego in 1961 and east to Phoenix, Arizona, in 1968. A mail order firm named the Sunset House was also acquired in 1968. In 1970, the company acquired Emporium-Capwell Co., itself the holding company for Emporium in San Francisco (and suburbs) and Capwell's (H.C. Capwell Co.) in Oakland (and suburbs) and keeping their respective names on the stores in the San Francisco Bay Area.

Also in 1969, Broadway-Hale acquired the then 3-unit Neiman Marcus specialty department store, based in Dallas, Texas, and the Walden Book Co. (known more commonly as Waldenbooks) and began to actively grow those businesses, nationwide.

=== 1970s–1980s ===
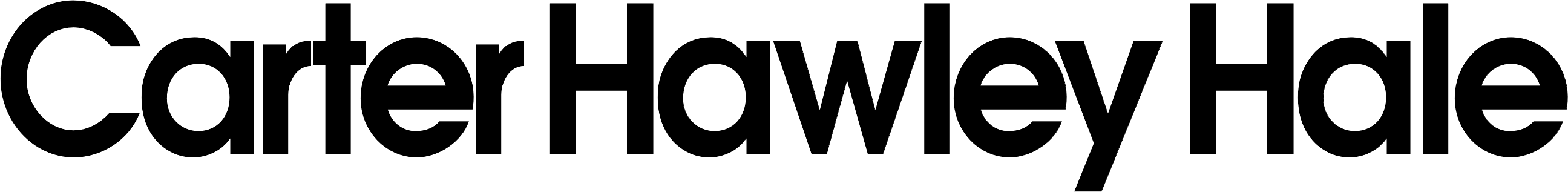
Carter Hawley Hale logo (c. 1974)

In 1972, Prentis Hale retired as chairman, Edward Carter assumed the chairmanship and Philip M. Hawley (who started as a women's sportswear buyer in 1958) became company president. In 1974, in a news release it states, CHH stated that to reflect the executives' contributions, the corporate parent was adopting the name Carter Hawley Hale Stores, Inc. The new name was a major tongue twister, and stock analysts sometimes called it "Ego, Inc." The Wall Street Journal reported in 1984 that some critics accused Carter and Hawley on being on an "ego trip". In 1977, Carter retired. Hawley was appointed CEO.

The company continued to be an active acquirer, in 1972 acquiring Bergdorf Goodman in New York, and Holt Renfrew of Montreal, Canada. After attempting an ill-fated, unsuccessful hostile takeover of Marshall Field in 1977, the company acquired the venerable but tattered John Wanamaker's of Philadelphia for $60 million (cash) in April 1978. That was followed by a stock swap for Thalhimers of Richmond, Virginia in August 1978. Contempo Casuals was a May 1979, takeover. Emporium and Capwell's were merged to form a unified San Francisco Bay-area presence as Emporium-Capwell in 1980, Weinstock's moved into Utah and Reno, Nevada, and The Broadway stores were split into separate Los Angeles and Phoenix–based divisions as the chain expanded into Colorado, New Mexico and Nevada. Sales increased, but profits did not. The saying on Wall Street was "God gave them Southern California, and they blew it", which The Wall Street Journal had attributed to Monroe H. Greenstein, a retailing analyst at Bear Stearns.

In 1980, CHH decided to get rid of units which catered to the lower economic markets. The first to go was the Sunset House mail order unit which also operated novelty shops in shopping malls. CHH found a buyer that only wanted the mail order unit and the mall stores were closed in 1981.

Faced with continuing poor results, and two hostile takeover attempts by The Limited in 1984 and 1986, the company, still led by Phillip M. Hawley, reacted by first selling Waldenbooks to Kmart in 1984, Holt Renfrew to the Weston Family in April 1986, Wanamaker's to A. Alfred Taubman's Woodward & Lothrop in January 1987 and then splitting off the desirable specialty store business as Neiman-Marcus Group, Inc. (encompassing the Neiman-Marcus, Bergdorf Goodman and Contempo Casuals stores). The company that had rescued Carter Hawley Hale from The Limited takeover-attempts, theater owner/soft-drink bottler-cum-investment company General Cinema (later renamed Harcourt General), assumed majority ownership of Neiman-Marcus Group in 1986 as its reward. Thalhimer's was sold to May Department Stores in December 1990.

=== 1990s and the end ===
From its heights in 1984 as the sixth-largest department store chain firm in the United States, CHH fell into Chapter 11 bankruptcy in 1991. Besides the financial problems of surviving the 1980s era of hostile takeovers, the main California department store business had faltered because of increasing competition from Nordstrom.

In 1992, after one and one-half years of bankruptcy negotiations, financier Sam Zell and his Zell/Chilmark Fund completed the reorganization of the newly renamed Broadway Stores, Inc., taking a 75 percent stake. The company finally emerged from bankruptcy in October 1992 and Hawley promptly announced his retirement. In early 1993, the three Utah-based Weinstock's stores were closed and the store leases were sold to Mervyns, Dillard's, and ZCMI.

After the takeover by Zell, Hawley was replaced as CEO by David Dworkin. Dworkin tried to slow the outward flow of cash from the company by remodeling stores and streamlining operations. In June 1994, the shareholders of Carter Hawley Hale Stores, Inc. voted to change the name of the company to Broadway Stores, Inc. to symbolize a change in the ailing company, but it was too late to make a difference.

The final blow came on August 8, 1995, when the firm's lenders announced they would not advance the company any additional funds – which were needed to pay suppliers for new, as well as existing inventory. A week later, the firm announced its sale to Federated Department Stores which effectively marked the beginning of the end to the remnant nameplates that the stores had operated under.

The newly streamlined company was short-lived, however. In August 1995, Federated Department Stores agreed to acquire Broadway Stores. The acquisition was completed on October 12. The chain was dissolved in 1996 as Federated consolidated the former Broadway, Emporium and Weinstock's stores, along with its own Macy's California and Bullock's chains (acquired in 1994), to form Macy's West. Several duplicative units were sold to Sears or shuttered, while Federated also used the real estate of five stores (Emporium-Capwell Stanford Shopping Center, Broadway Sherman Oaks Fashion Square, Broadway Century City Shopping Center, Broadway Beverly Center, and Broadway Fashion Island Newport Beach) to finally bring its Bloomingdale's chain to the West Coast.

On September 28, 2006, Emporium-Capwell's Market Street flagship was redeveloped to house another Bloomingdale's location as well as an expansion of the adjoining shopping center Westfield San Francisco Centre. In addition, the one-time CHH Corporate Offices in the former Superior Oil Company Building at 550 South Flower Street in Los Angeles, right next door to The California Club (of which Carter and Hawley were members), were converted into a three-star boutique hotel called "The Standard."

== Selected divisions ==
=== Broadway ===
The Broadway division was the largest department store division within the company. The division could trace its roots to the Broadway Department Store that was founded in Los Angeles by Arthur Letts, Sr. in 1896. By 1992, the division expanded throughout Southern California and started expanded outside of California. In 1979, the division was split into the Phoenix-based Broadway Southwest to handle the out-of-state stores and the Los Angeles–based Broadway Southern California to handle the stores within California. The two separate divisions were consolidated in 1992 after many of the non-Californian stores were closed. At the time of its parent acquisition by Federated, Broadway had 52 stores.

=== Hale's ===
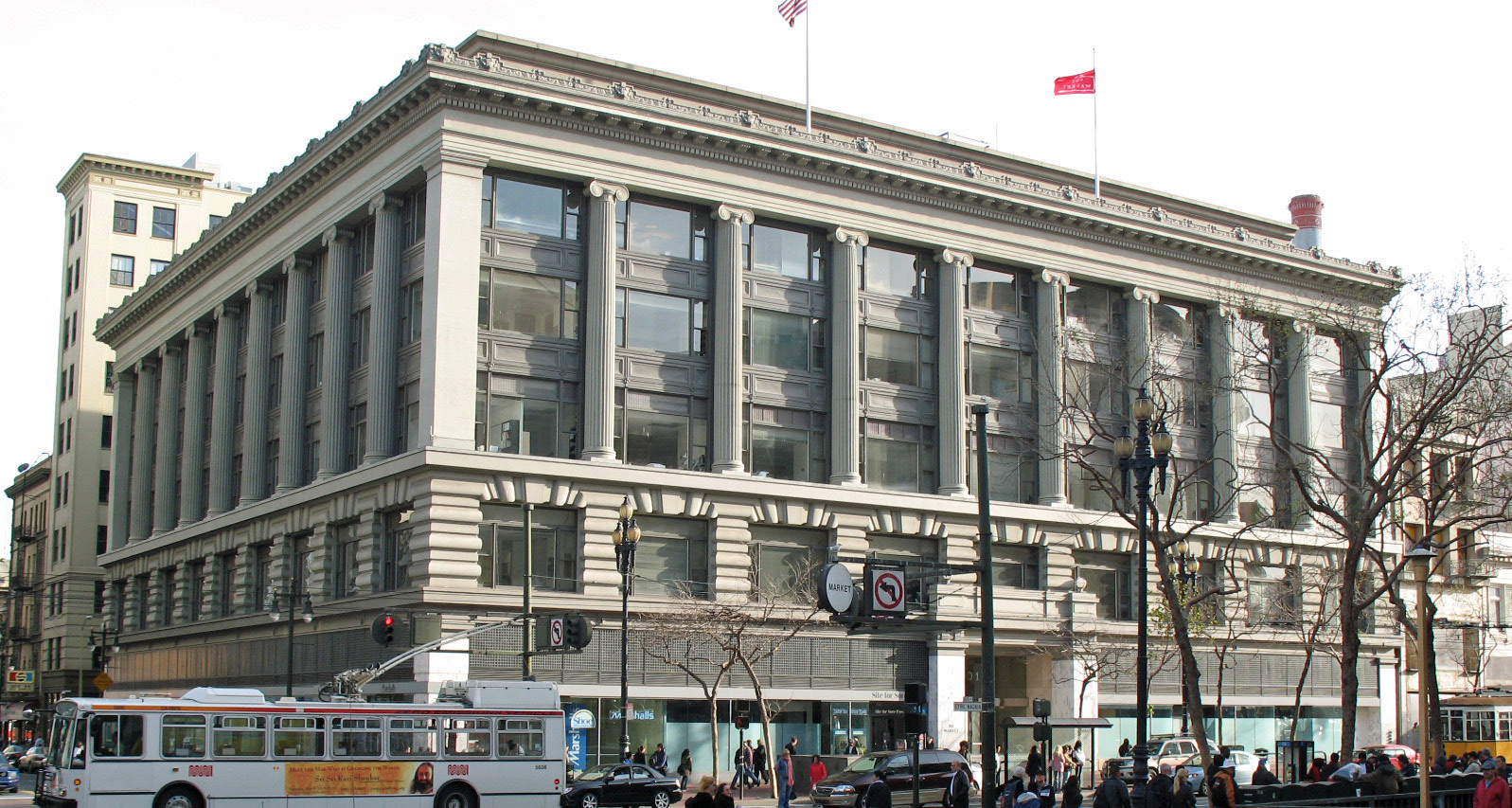
Former Hale's store in San Francisco at 5th and Market in 2008

The chain's beginnings date from The Criterion store founded in Sacramento, California, in 1880 by the Hale Brothers, Prentis Cobb Hale I and Marshal Hale and adopted their name later the same year. By 1936, scion Prentis Cobb Hale worked as a stock clerk in the family store after he graduated from Stanford University. The company had expanded throughout Northern California, including a location at 989 Market Street in San Francisco by 1902 (replaced in 1912 by a location at 901 Market Street). By 1949, the company had acquired its Sacramento-based rival Weinstock, Lubin & Co. Weinstock's was kept as a separate brand. Paradoxically, the Hale brand was later absorbed by the Weinstock's brand in Northern California.

=== Emporium-Capwell ===
Emporium-Capwell was created by the 1927 merger of the San Francisco–based Emporium Company and the Oakland-based H.C. Capwell Company. This company kept the two brands separate and had opened many Emporium and Capwell stores respectively throughout the San Francisco Bay Area prior to its acquisition by Broadway-Hale in 1970. Under Carter Hawley Hale, there were 12 Emporiums and six Capwell stores when the two brands were merged to form the single Emporium-Capwell brand in 1980. There were 22 Emporium-Capwell stores left at the time of its parent's acquisition by Federated.

=== Weinstock's ===
Weinstock's could trace its origins to the Sacramento-based Weinstock, Lubin & Co. There were 8 Weinstock's store left at the time of its parent's acquisition by Federated.

== ERISA case ==
Carter Hawley Hale also is known as a famous case study regarding its retirement plans. Because it offered its employees a profit-sharing plan, and not a retirement fund, under the Federal Employee Retirement Income Security Act (ERISA) pension plan law, the trustee was under no obligation to diversify the fund. Because of the nondiversification and continued purchase of Carter Hawley Hale stock, the employee fund soon was stuck with a precipitous loss in value. Its employees' low morale contributed to its problems.

== Advertising ==
The longtime print and television-radio media advertising slogans during the 1970s until The Broadway closed for good were "It's at the Broadway" (radio and television only) and "The Broadway is Southern California" (all media). A baritone male voice-over announcer provided the verbalized slogan.

== See also ==
- List of defunct department stores of the United States
