= Hannah Carter Japanese Garden =

Garden in Los Angeles, California, United States

Coordinates: 34.08251°N 118.44456°W

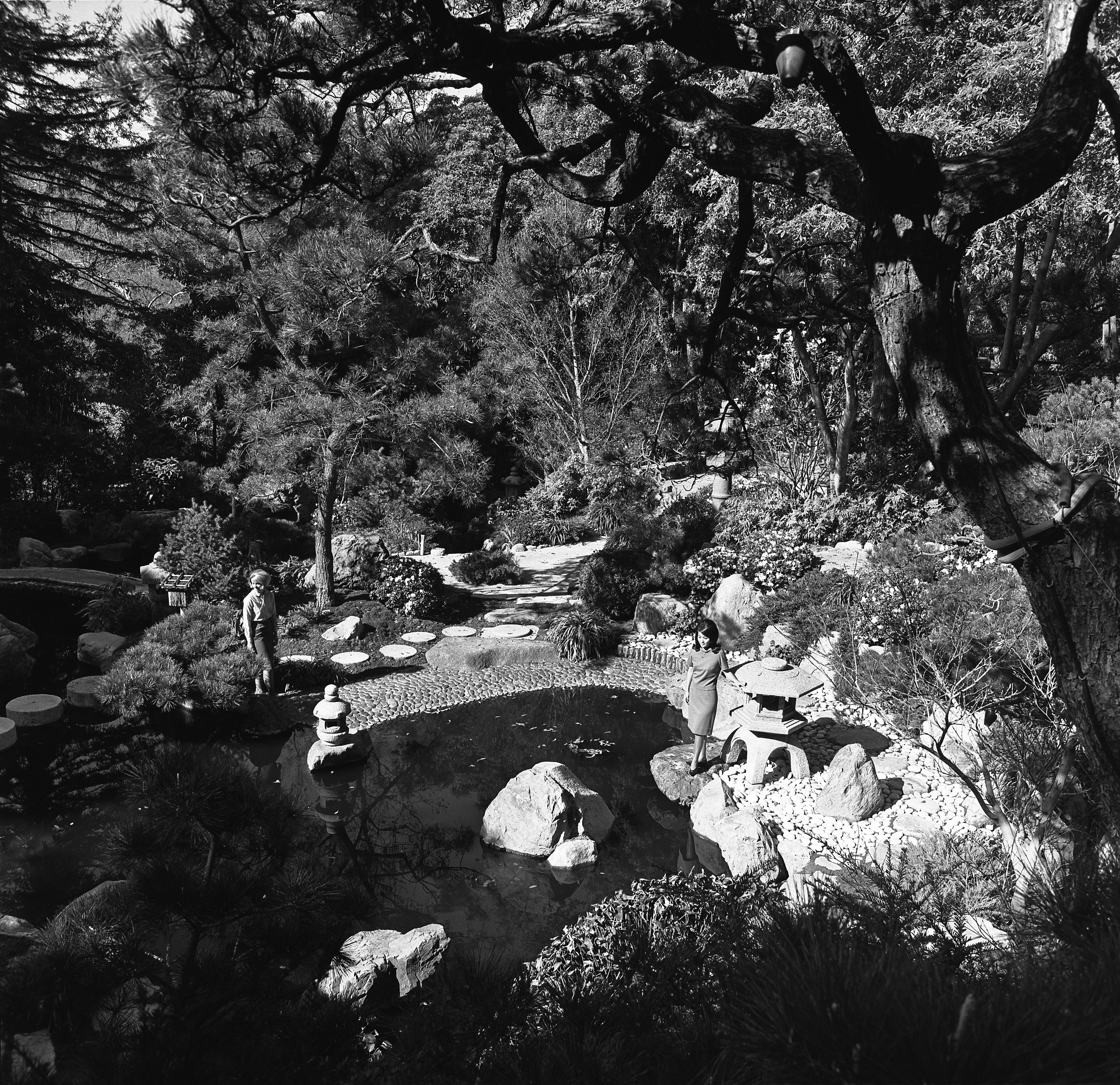
Hannah Carter Japanese Garden

The Hannah Carter Japanese Garden is a private Japanese garden located in Bel Air, Los Angeles, California. Known as Shikyo-en when completed in 1961, it emphasizes water, stones, and evergreen plants. The naturalistic hillside site features streams, a waterfall, a tea house, and blooming magnolia and camellia trees. According to the Los Angeles Conservancy, the garden is among the largest and most significant private residential Japanese-style gardens built in the United States in the immediate Post-World War II period. The garden was donated to the University of California, Los Angeles in 1965 and open to the public until 2011. Following a legal dispute with Hannah Carter's children, it was sold to a private citizen in 2016.

== Location ==
The garden is located in a residential neighborhood at 10619 Bellagio Road in Bel Air, Los Angeles.

== History ==
The 1.5 acres (0.61 ha) site was originally developed in 1927 by oilman Gordon G. Guiberson as a Hawaiian garden on the Harry Calendar estate by landscape architect A.E. Hanson (1893–1986). It was dedicated to his mother, Ethel L. Guiberson, who founded the Beverly Hills Garden Club in the early 1930s.

The Japanese garden was designed by Nagao Sakurai in 1959 and constructed between 1959 and 1961. In 1965, it was purchased by Edward W. Carter (1911–1996). Carter named it after his second wife, Hannah Carter. The same year, Carter, who served as Chair of the University of California Board of Regents, donated it to the University of California, Los Angeles (UCLA). The donation included their house uphill from the garden. The garden was rehabilitated in 1969 by UCLA Professor Koichi Kawana after heavy rainfall caused damage to the site.

Edward Carter died in 1996. Hannah Carter lived in the house till 2006. After she died in 2009, the regents of the university asked a court to release them from the commitment to maintain the garden forever and allow the sale of the house and garden at auction.

In 2011, UCLA closed the garden to the public because of rising costs, deferred maintenance, and lack of attendance as a result of limited parking. On March 3, 2012, the garden was listed for sale by Coldwell Banker. However, the prospective sale was opposed by the American Public Gardens Association, the American Society of Landscape Architects, the Bel Air Garden Club, the California Garden and Landscape History Society, the California Preservation Foundation, the Cultural Landscape Foundation, The Garden Conservancy, the Los Angeles Conservancy, the National Trust for Historic Preservation, the North American Japanese Garden Association, etc. On July 27, 2012 the Los Angeles County Superior Court halted the listing by issuing a preliminary injunction. Judge Lisa Hart Cole described the action of UCLA and the Regents as "duplicitous."

The Regents appealed the preliminary injunction. On September 16, 2013, the three judge Court of Appeal unanimously upheld the preliminary injunction.

A trial date was scheduled beginning July 20, 2015 at the Santa Monica Courthouse of Los Angeles Superior Court. In October 2015, the heirs agreed to let UCLA sell the garden as long as the new owners kept the garden intact for the next 30 years. Meanwhile, the University of California Board of Regents established a US$500,000 endowment whose annual income to go to the preservation of the garden.

In June 2016, UCLA sold the garden to developer Mark Gabay, the co-founder of the Charles Company, for US$12.5 million. The new owner is not required to open the garden to the public.

== Overview ==
It features winding paths, a waterfall, and a stone pagoda. Moreover, the main gate, garden houses, bridges and family shrines were built in Japan and reassembled in California. The garden includes only plants that grow in Japan. For example, it includes the following trees: pine trees, redwood trees, apricot, magnolia, maple and plum trees, California Live Oak trees, pittosporum, and purple beech trees.
