= The Harvest Gypsies =

Series of articles by John Steinbeck

First edition of pamphlet

The Harvest Gypsies, by John Steinbeck, is a series of feature-story articles written on commission for The San Francisco News about the lives and times of migrant workers in California's Central Valley. Published daily from October 5 to 12, 1936, Steinbeck explores and explains the hardships and triumphs of American migrant workers during the Great Depression, tracing their paths and the stories of their lives and travels from one crop harvest to the next crop harvest as they eked out a stark existence as temporary farmhands.

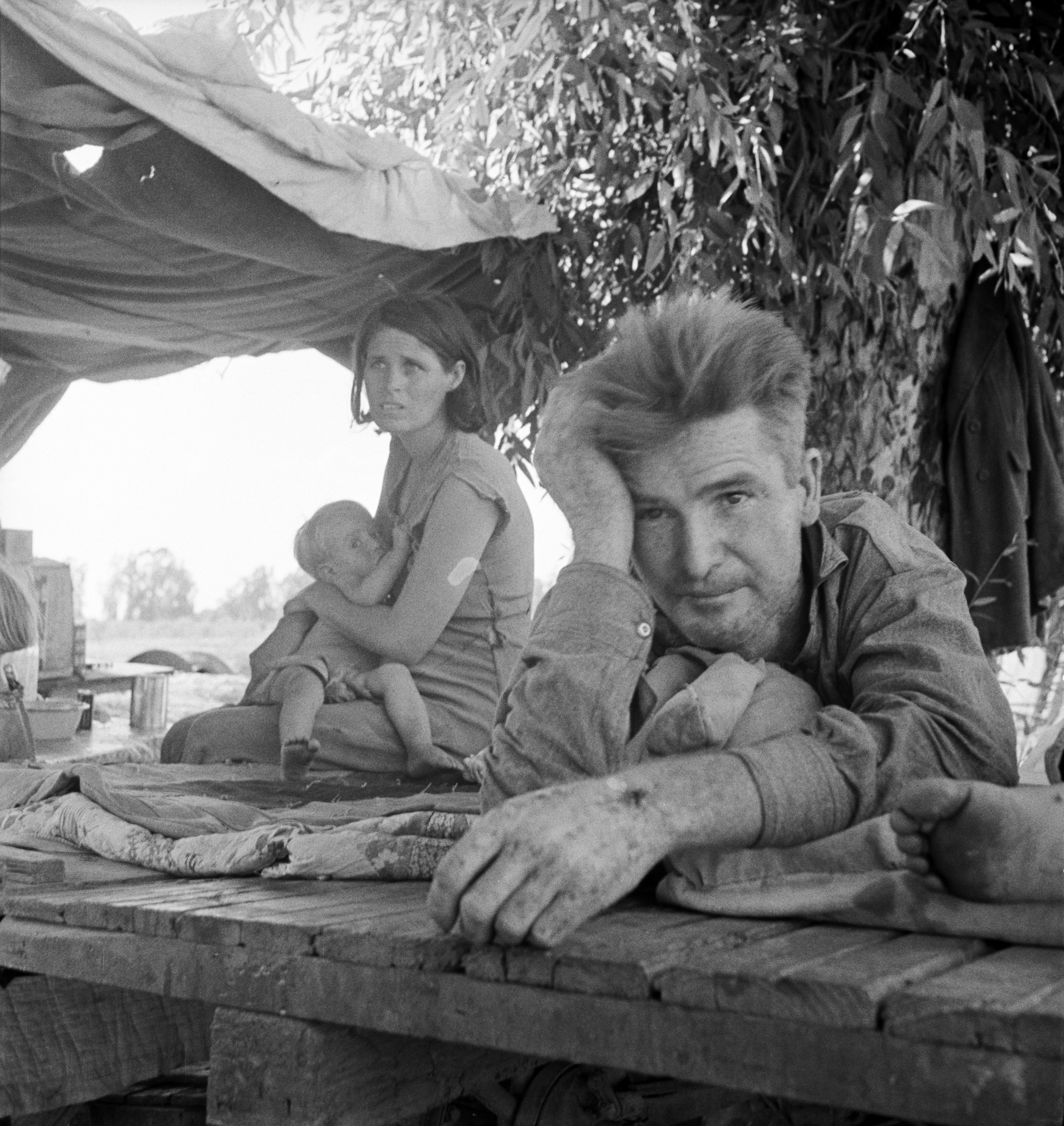
Drought refugees from Oklahoma camping by the roadside. They hope to work in the cotton fields. There are seven in the family. Blythe, California. (photo by Dorothea Lange, 1936)

In 1938, the feature-story articles were published as the pamphlet Their Blood Is Strong, by the Simon J. Lubin Society, a non-profit organization dedicated to educating Americans about the socio-economic plight of the migrant worker. The pamphlet included the seven articles, plus Steinbeck's new epilogue "Starvation Under the Orange Trees" and twenty-two photographs of the migrant workers, by Dorothea Lange; ten thousand copies of Their Blood Is Strong were sold at twenty-five cents each.

== Historical context ==
=== Historical background ===
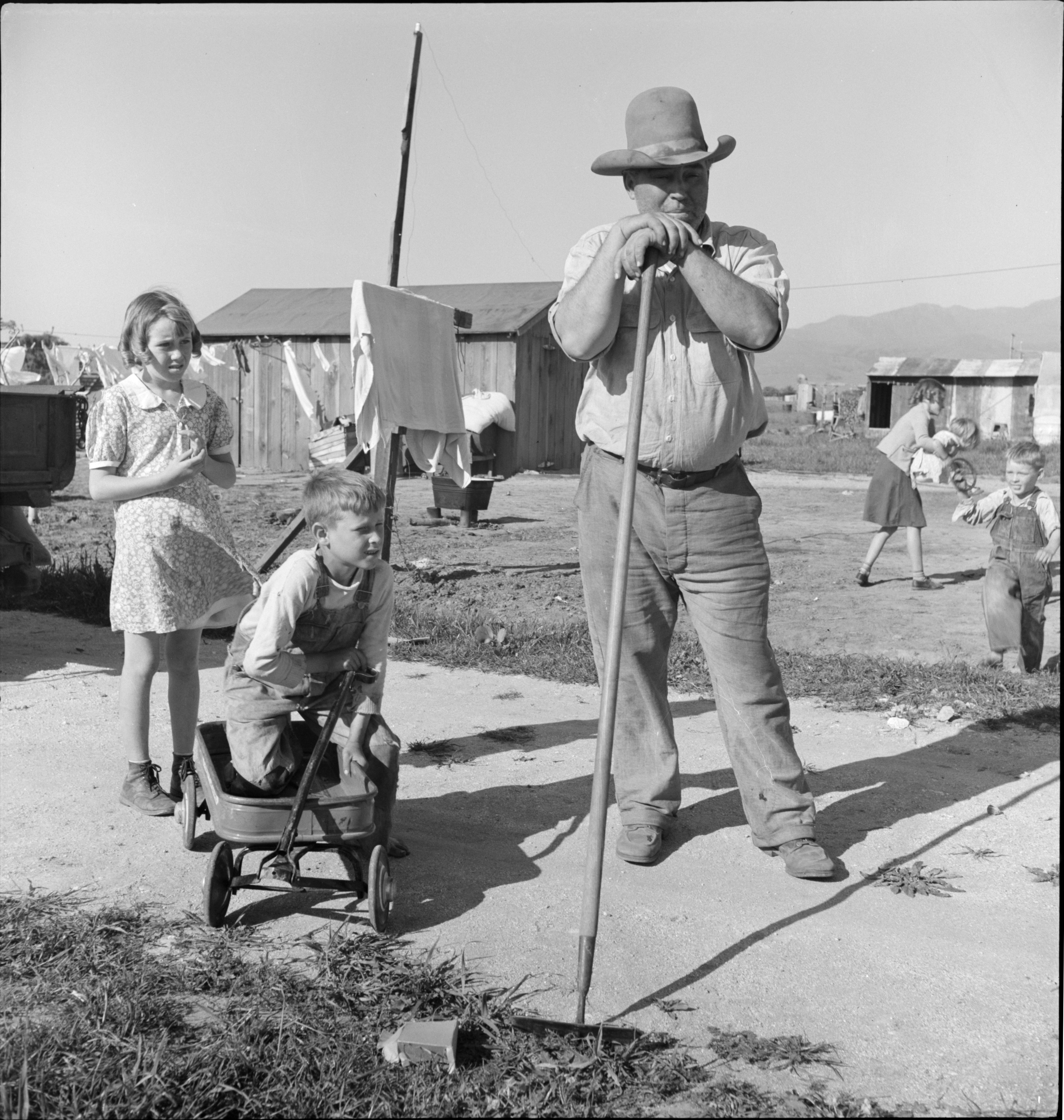
Outskirts of Salinas, California. Rapidly growing settlement of lettuce workers. Family from Oklahoma settling in makeshift dwelling: Dorothea Lange 1939

From 1931 to 1939, drought and soil erosion across the Midwestern and Southern Plains created one of the lasting images of the Great Depression: the Dust Bowl. During this time, over one million Americans emigrated from their native states to California. The number of emigrants was equal to more than twenty percent of the total population of California at the time. The abundance of workers desperate for employment led to extraordinarily low wages, which in turn created widespread underemployment and poverty amongst the migrant workers. Resultant of these conditions were the worker camps, labor strife, and horrific living arrangements described by Steinbeck in The Harvest Gypsies. Steinbeck, a California native himself, sought to capture these new developments and their impact on California culture. He first addressed the issue with his novel In Dubious Battle (1936), which took a harvesters’ strike as its subject. Impressed by the novel, San Francisco News editor George West commissioned Steinbeck to report on the situation with a series of articles in the fall of 1936.

=== The role of Tom Collins and Sanora Babb ===
Steinbeck obtained significant assistance from Farm Security Administration (FSA) documents, including reports compiled by Tom Collins, manager of a federal camp for migrants in Arvin, CA. Collins compiled these extensive interviews that contained residents' stories, songs, and folklore into a compendium which he shared with Steinbeck, who used it and his own notes to write The Harvest Gypsies.

Two years after the publication of The Harvest Gypsies, Sanora Babb began working for Collins and contributed notes to the FSA documents. "Unbeknownst to Babb, Collins was sharing her reports with writer John Steinbeck." The subsequent success of Steinbeck's The Grapes of Wrath (1939) precluded her publishing of her novel Whose Names Are Unknown, because Random House Publishers in New York feared that the market could not support two novels on the same topic in the same year.

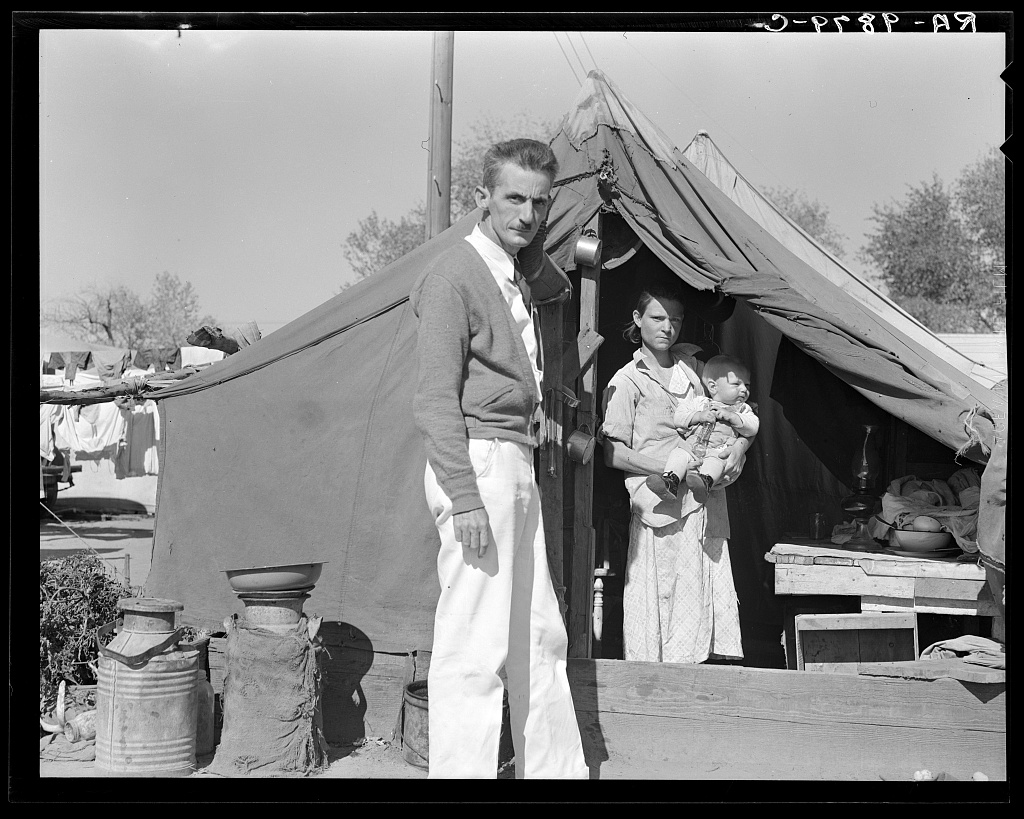
Tom Collins was the manager of the Kern migrant camp in 1936 when Dorothea Lange took this photograph of him with a migrant mother in the background.

=== Influence on future literary works ===
The Harvest Gypsies preceded several of Steinbeck's celebrated works with migrant workers at the center, among them Of Mice and Men (1937) and The Grapes of Wrath (1939). According to Steinbeck scholar Robert DeMott, The Harvest Gypsies provided Steinbeck a repository of precise information and folk values: "From countless hours of listening to migrant people, working beside them, listening to them and sharing their problems, Steinbeck drew all the correct details of human form, language, and landscape that ensure artistic verisimilitude, as well as the subtler nuances of dialect, idiosyncratic tics, habits, and gestures, which animate fictional characterization." This rich information would figure in his later works, as Steinbeck used the experience to create not only the vibrant characters but also the vivid settings of migrant camps. A host of details first described in The Harvest Gypsies reappear in The Grapes of Wrath, among them Steinbeck's portrayals of the “dignity and decency” of government camps, the widespread hunger and suffering of children, and the injustice of the authorities operating within the camps. Even the famous conclusion of The Grapes of Wrath finds a basis within the account of a stillborn child in The Harvest Gypsies.

=== Significance in John Steinbeck's career ===
The impact of Steinbeck's investigative reporting for The Harvest Gypsies on his literary career cannot be underestimated, according to scholar William Howarth. DeMott notes that The Harvest Gypsies "solidified [Steinbeck's] credibility—both in and out of migrant camps—as a serious commentator in a league with Dorothea Lange's husband, Paul Taylor, and Carey McWilliams, two other influential and respected investigators."

== Production of the pamphlet ==
Helen Hosmer, a central figure in California labor circles, was responsible for the re-publication of the articles as Their Blood Is Strong. Steinbeck did not initiate the re-publishing of the series. By 1938, he had moved on to writing The Grapes of Wrath full-time and had to be persuaded by Hosmer to get involved in reissuing the series. Hosmer had worked as a researcher for the Farm Security Administration in the mid 1930s, where she met Dorothea Lange and economist Paul Taylor. She met Steinbeck in that period and supplied him with data files she had collected for the Farm Security Administration. After Hosmer left the FSA, she founded the Simon J. Lubin Society to advocate on behalf of workers.

According to Hosmer, Steinbeck was reluctant to participate in the project. “He was scared to death of all these left-wingers swarming around,” she said in an oral history interview in 1992. Eventually, Steinbeck agreed to allow Hosmer to publish the series. She combined the articles with Dorothea Lange's photographs and gave the pamphlet its title Their Blood Is Strong.

Hosmer printed a first order of 100 pamphlets and sold them for 25 cents, the proceeds of which went to the Simon J. Lubin Society. Steinbeck did not receive any money from the project. Demand quickly exceeded the first print run and the pamphlet became a valued commodity. Eastern publishing houses contacted Hosmer to try to purchase mint condition copies, offering as much as $100 per pamphlet.

== Synopsis ==
=== Article I ===
Dated October 5, 1936, Article I serves as a general introduction to the Migrant Farm Worker, which Steinbeck describes as "that shifting group of nomadic, poverty-stricken harvesters driven by hunger and the threat of hunger from crop to crop, from harvest to harvest." Although there are a few migrant workers in Oregon and even Washington, the vast majority came to California; Steinbeck estimates that there are "at least 150,000 homeless migrants wandering up and down the state." This concentration of migrant farm workers in California is due to "the unique nature of California agriculture," in which a crop that for most of the year requires only 20 laborers for maintenance will require 2,000 during harvest time. California requires a large influx of migrant workers during the harvest, which occurs at different times for different crops. Those who hire the migrants encourage their immigration so much that "twice as much labor as was necessary" was present, and wages were kept low.

Migrants are essential to the functioning of California's agricultural economy, but, at the same time, they are reviled for being "dirty" and a drain on government support systems - in other words, for being impoverished. "The migrants are needed," Steinbeck states, "and they are hated." A small child living in the "squatter's camp" agrees: "When they need us they call us migrants, and when we've picked their crop, we're bums and we got to get out." The migrants, however, are desperate to get out of poverty. They want nothing more, Steinbeck asserts, than to become economically self-sufficient again: "as they move wearily from harvest to harvest, there is one urge and one overwhelming need, to acquire a little land again, and to settle on it and stop their wandering." They are wanderers not by choice, but because they have no other way to survive. Steinbeck continuously emphasizes the virtues and inherent dignity of these farmers, which serves to make their current destitution all the worse.

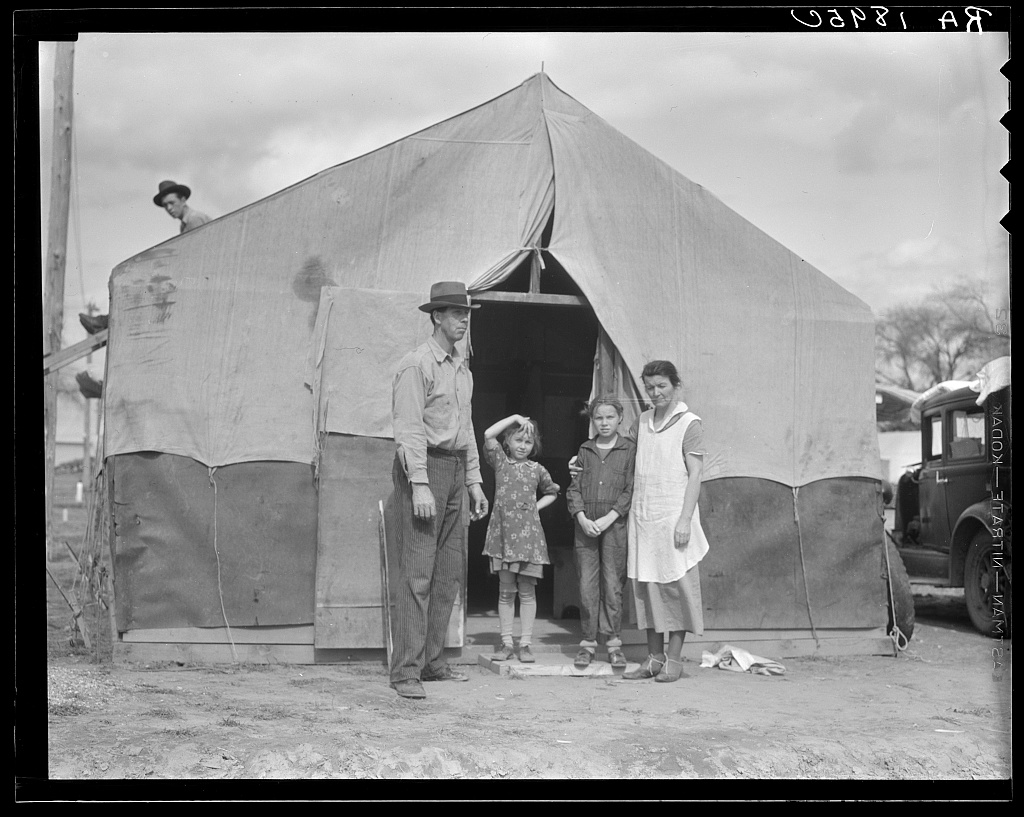
Photo by Dorothea Lange of a migrant family in Kern County. The "new migrant worker" Steinbeck discusses is that who comes with his family. 1936

The Great Depression sees a transformation in the ethnic make-up of the migrant farmer. In the past, migrant farmers were almost exclusively immigrants - first from China, then Japan, Mexico, and the Philippines (Steinbeck discusses the treatment of non-white/non-American workers more extensively in Article VI). But the combination of the Great Depression and the Dust Bowl introduced a new type of migrant worker: the white American family, women and children included. They came from "the agricultural populations of Oklahoma, Nebraska, and parts of Kansas and Texas" most affected by the Dust Bowl. Steinbeck describes these families as once-prosperous - or at least once self-sustaining - farmers from the Midwest, "resourceful and intelligent Americans" and honest workers who experienced the "curious and terrible pain" of having everything they worked for taken away from them. Throughout the article, Steinbeck cautions his reader that "the old methods of repression...are not going to work [because] these are American people." It is not that Steinbeck believes that non-white races deserve worse treatment than Americans; Article VII expresses Steinbeck's belief that American treatment of non-white migrant farmers has generally been "a disgraceful picture of greed and cruelty" by American farm owners. American migrants are different, Steinbeck believes, not because they necessarily deserve better treatment but because they will (in theory) refuse to tolerate the horrible conditions under which immigrant farmers labored. Thus, Steinbeck urges his readers to be prepared to "work out the problem to their benefit as well as ours."

=== Article II ===
Dated October 6, 1936, Article II explores the camps of squatters, focusing on three families. Steinbeck describes the materiality of these settlements, which were made up of pieces from "city dumps," and were often constructed near bodies of water such as riverbanks and irrigation ditches. Fixated on the living conditions of the camps, Steinbeck ruminates on the dirt that pervaded them, the sanitary conditions of those who lived in them, and the precariousness of their long-term futures.

Steinbeck pays great attention to highlight how the Depression has impacted the families in the squatter camps by tracing their economic degeneration, and the intense precision and consistency that their agricultural work demands. He mentions a family that had been very successful farmers, and another that had owned a grocery store. Additionally, he notes the tempered optimism that many new residents had, and works to humanize the squatters: their desire to educate their children, and the loss of loved ones that marks their lives evoke sympathy. With the "filth" and malnutrition of the camps, causes of death are clear to Steinbeck—and, he purports, to the squatters.

The Great Depression did not do away with class differences, however, as different families were able to live in varying levels of sanitation and well-being. Steinbeck notes a family whose children refused to go to school, weary of the bullying that they would receive from "The better-dressed children." Teachers had too much on their hands to deal with such behavior, and the parents of the better-off students did not want the diseases of households with poorer hygiene to enter schools. The Depression did reorient class structures, however. The middle class was poor, and the lower class was even poorer. And, there was a certain inevitability to the lower class' growth, according to Steinbeck; referencing a man in the lower class who had all but given up, he writes that "This is what the man in the tent will be in six months; what the man in the paper house with its peaked roof will be in a year, after his house has washed down and his children have sickened or died, after the loss of dignity and spirit have cut him down to a kind of sub-humanity."

Steinbeck extends the camp's economic hopelessness to a larger societal one. He mentions social workers and survey workers who took data from the settlements, only to file it away—even this was hopeless, as "It has been done so often so little has come of it." Disease was another force that was a given, and epidemics could be treated by "country doctor[s]" in "the pest house." However, Steinbeck writes that "The country hospital has no room for measles, mumps, [and] whooping cough," which posed great dangers to children. Making things worse, the poor were often ignorant of how to utilize the free clinics that supposedly existed to serve them, and skeptical of the interaction with authorities that pursuing health services would entail.

Ultimately, Steinbeck contextualizes the narrow scope of his observations within the larger scale of its existence. He states that "This is the squatters' camp. Some are a little better, some much worse," pointing out that while he has described three families, "In some of the camps there are as many as three hundred families like these." He closes Article II by making a plea for sympathy: if some of the squatters steal, or begin to express a distaste for the relatively affluent, "the reason is not to be sought in their origin nor in any tendency to weakness in their character." Above all, the squatters, he emphasizes, are human beings that deserve human understanding.

=== Article III ===
Dated October 7, 1936 Steinbeck's third article explores the system of oppression that large farms have developed so as to maintain their complete control over the lives of migrant workers. Steinbeck first draws a juxtaposition between the large farms, responsible for the oppression, and the smaller farms that often treat the migrants more properly. The author points out that small farms are often forced to side with the larger farms on issues of labor because of the former's debt with the banks, which are controlled by the farm association. To ignore the demands of the large farms might cause farmers to have their smaller farms foreclosed upon.

Steinbeck then expounds upon the Farmers Association's almost complete control over labor in California and the terrible financial conditions this control has engendered for migrant workers. Steinbeck points out that to work on large farms workers must agree to pay rent, losing some of their salary almost immediately. Furthermore, the housing consists of one-room shacks where a migrant worker must fit his entire family, with no rug, no bed, no running water, and no toilet. Instead, there is a septic tank usually somewhere down the street. Working conditions are particularly tiring. Workers work with a "pacer" who maintains the pace at which migrants should be harvesting crops. If a migrant worker falls behind, he is fired. Steinbeck also explains that the large farms provide no amenities for relaxation or entertainment.

Steinbeck then goes on to describe the system of deputies that prevent the migrant workers from unionizing. Deputies are armed employees who keep the migrants in line. Steinbeck explains that "resisting an officer" often results in being shot. The deputies are trained to make workers feel "inferior and insecure." The deputies also break up all gatherings so as to prevent possible unionization. This constant degradation at the hands of the deputies sometimes leads to revolts. Steinbeck ends the article by explaining that large farms want very little to change and that "trails are too expensive."

=== Article IV ===
Dated October 8, 1936, this article concentrates on camps developed by the Resettlement Administration as hubs for refugees from the Dust Bowl. Steinbeck details the characteristics of two camps at Arvin (now called Weedpatch) and Marysville. Each camp comprised around 200 families. To participate in life at these camps to pay their keep, farmers were responsible for helping clean the camp through two hours a week of chores.

Steinbeck highly praises the innovation of these camps, writing "The result has been more than could be expected. From the first, the intent of the management has been to restore the dignity and decency that had been kicked out of the migrants by their intolerable mode of life." He also celebrated how the organization of these camps advanced American ideals, explaining that "people in the camps are encouraged to govern themselves, and they have responded with simple and workable democracy." Steinbeck also makes the case that with their dignity restored and their sense of "having something of their own, these men are better workers."

Observing workers and their families living in these camps, Steinbeck reports that many individuals displayed "a steadiness of gaze and a self-confidence that can only come of restored dignity." And he attributes this recuperation of basic dignity to "the new position of the migrant in the community." No longer an individual who is hated and vulnerable, those living in these camps were transformed into active members of communal living. Many women participated in an organization called The Good Neighbors, monitoring a nursery and carrying out sewing projects to produce clothing for camp members. Steinbeck describes how whenever a new family joins the camp, they are immediately welcomed by members of The Good Neighbors and instructed on the practices of the camp. Inhabitants of the camp come together to pool resources that the incoming family might be lacking, and any sick members of the family are also attended.

Another point Steinbeck makes in favor of these camps is the good behavior of camp members, emphasizing how in their first years of operation neither camp needed police.

=== Article V ===
In Article V, dated October 9, 1936, Steinbeck illustrates the migrant family's struggles to obtain aid, and state of California's failure to help them do so. The migrant family is never fully employed, so they always need aid. Since they must travel for work seasonally, they never have permanent residence, and are always confronted with challenges when applying for aid.

The need to travel continuously to find work presents the migrant family with additional problems related to accessibility. Benefits necessary to a family's survival are only obtainable with a permanent residence, but the migrant family cannot stop for long enough to establish one, lest they starve. Most needed of these resources—yet most inaccessible—are hospitals.

Steinbeck follows a former Oklahoma ranching family's medical struggles, illustrating the unavailability of medical care and other welfare services for migrant workers. The family consists of a fifty-year-old father, a forty-five-year-old mother, two sons, fifteen and twelve, and a six-year-old daughter traveling to California in their truck, starting off picking oranges.

When their truck breaks down, fixing it consumes a third of their initial earnings. This leaves little money to pay for medical problems—the father's sprained ankle and the daughter's measles. With the father out of work, the boys become the primary earners. The twelve-year-old steals a brass gear to sell, and the father must walk to town to bail him out of jail. This worsens his ankle, delaying his return to work.

Out of money, the family applies for relief. They are informed they are ineligible because they do not hold a permanent residence. The family's neighbors, not much better off, provide food when they can, but this only stretches so far.

The family faces their greatest adversity when the fifteen-year-old boy, the family's primary earner, falls ill with appendicitis. The father, still lame, seeks aid at the hospital, but town residents occupy all of the beds. Steinbeck writes that the father's status as a migrant worker results in hospital officials failing to weigh the gravity of the situation. The son lapses into unconsciousness, and the family is unable to reach a doctor before he dies of a ruptured appendix.

The family sells the truck, their means of traveling to work, in order to pay for the son's burial. The father returns to work with his bad ankle, paying neighbors for rides, but it soon gives out, limiting his earnings. The daughter, malnourished, falls ill again, and the father seeks out a private doctor. He must pay in advance, and after requesting two days pay from work, loses his job and falls into debt.

Steinbeck uses the case of this family, because it is among thousands of its kind. He suggests that the family, like many others, could have received help, but had no resources to obtain it. Steinbeck develops three critiques of how California dealt with migrant workers. First, the state denied there were such problems, and secondly, when counties admitted to the existence of these problems, they denied responsibility because the workers were transient. Lastly, in what Steinbeck calls “a game of medicine ball,” counties continuously changed their borders, to displace migrant workers.

The overarching problem, Steinbeck writes, was the singular focus on the immediate economy, and the inability to recognize the long term value of a strong labor force. He depicts the failure to link crop yield with the health of migrant workers by looking at the hookworm problem that spread across several counties. Ideas of isolating or treating victims were overlooked, and the infected were sent to other counties where they spread the parasites.

=== Article VI ===
Dated October 10, 1936, Article VI is Steinbeck's overview of the traditional treatment of non-white/non-American migrant farm workers, a situation that Steinbeck describes as being characterized by "terrorism, squalor, and starvation." Steinbeck's first sentence says it all: "The history of California's importation and treatment of foreign labor is a disgraceful picture of greed and cruelty." Immigrant labor was valued above white American labor for two reasons: immigrants accepted lesser pay and tolerated worse treatment. Throughout all seven articles, Steinbeck emphasizes that white Americans, bolstered by "pride and self-respect," were unwilling to accept the low pay and horrible working conditions accepted by immigrant laborers.

Merely in financial terms, "the nature of California's agriculture made the owners of farm land cry for peon labor," a situation that Steinbeck found despicable. The sheer scope and conditions of California agriculture required cheap labor of a kind that white Americans felt was not worth of their dignity. Steinbeck writes that "with the depression, farm wages sank to such a low level in the southern part of the state that white labor could not exist on them." Farm owners simply made greater profits because immigrant laborers accepted lower wages; therefore, they were constantly seeking out foreign labor rather than trying to pay white Americans a fair wage.

The desire for foreign labor, however, was motivated by more than monetary gain. Unlike white laborers, immigrants "could be treated as so much scrap when [they were] not needed" because the threat of deportation was always hanging over their heads. "The old methods of intimidation and starvation perfected against the foreign peons" that Steinbeck describes, would never be tolerated by white workers. Furthermore, since these laborers were not American citizens, they were not protected by American labor laws. Thus the preference to employ immigrant laborers remained constant, creating a cycle of need for such laborers, immigration, racism, and expulsion that repeated over and over.

"The one crime that will not be permitted by the large growers," therefore, is the act of labor organization. "They [the workers] commit...the unforgivable," Steinbeck writes, "in trying to organize for their own protection." Once workers have become fed up of being abused and begin to resist, then the great landowners have no more use for them, as they are no longer the "peon workers" that they were hired to be. Steinbeck states that "the usual terrorism" enacted against immigrant laborers was due in large part to "their organization."

The first major group of immigrant farmers were Chinese, originally "brought in as cheap labor to build the transcontinental railroads" before they then were forced to turn to farming. They were immediately reviled by American workers because "the traditional standard of living of the Chinese was so low that white labor could not compete with it." A combination of top-down and bottom-up efforts - immigration laws closing the borders and riots against Chinese laborers - eventually "drove the Chinese from the fields" and left a void of cheap labor that needed to be filled.

The next group were the Japanese, and they suffered the same fate as the Chinese laborers before them. "A low standard of living...allowed them to accumulate property while at the same time they took the jobs of white labor." Again, they were chased from the fields and from the country as a whole.

After the Japanese came the Mexicans, and again their acceptance of low wages threatened the livelihood of white workers. Besides the usual tactics of racially motivated attacks and changing immigration laws, the desire of Mexico to repatriate their departed citizens led many of the Mexican workers to leave California and return to their home country.

The final group Steinbeck discusses are the Filipino, "predominantly young, male, and single," which caused serious problems when they consorted with white women. Although inter-racial marriage was not allowed, extra-marital affairs occurred and contributed to "a reputation for immorality...[and] many race riots directed against them." Like in the case of the Mexican laborers, the Philippine Islands aided the United States in encouraging the return of their young men. While they still resided in California, they often lived in "families" of several young men who pooled their resources together and shared equipment and food.

By the time Steinbeck was writing, however, "the receding waves of foreign peon labor are leaving California agriculture to the mercies of our own people." "Foreign labor is on the wane in California," Steinbeck writes, and the future farm workers are to be white and American." Although landowners and farm owners began to attempt to subjugate "the new white migrant workers" to the terrorism that they enacted upon foreign workers, Steinbeck predicts that "they will not be successful," as white Americans "will insist on a standard of living much higher than that which was accorded the foreign "cheap labor."" Again, Steinbeck re-asserts his claim that white American laborers, possessing "pride and self-respect," will simply not tolerate the low pay and horrible conditions that foreign laborers had no choice but to accept. Thus Steinbeck sets the stage for his seventh and final article, a treatise on how conditions will need to change in response to the new migrants that California is dealing with.

=== Article VII ===
Article VII, dated October 12, 1936, addresses the problem of migrant farm workers. Steinbeck begins by saying that the “problem of the migrants” must be addressed, for the sake of the California agriculture which depended on them, and also for humanitarian reasons, given the inhumane living conditions of the migrant workers. Since the migrants were displaced farmers, he argues that they should not be removed from farm work and suggests that the federal government set aside land to be rented or sold to these families.

Subsistence farming would allow families to have enough food to survive in the off season—when migrant labor is not needed—and to have a more settled lifestyle, with children returning to school and communities developing among these resettled migrants. In addition, these communities would have access to medical attention, shared farm equipment, self-government, and “trained agriculturist[s] to instruct the people in scientific farming.”

Steinbeck suggests that the federal government should cover the cost of such a project, pointing out that “The cost of such ventures would not be much greater than the amount which is now spent for tear gas, machine guns and ammunition, and deputy sheriffs,” referencing contemporary labor conflict between farm owners and migrant workers. In addition, he argues that laborers and labor unions should be able to play a bigger role in wage determination and advertising for laborers to prevent the “great disorganized gold rush” that comes from too many laborers vying for too few jobs and the low wages that result from such an excess of labor.

To critics claiming that organized agricultural labor would destroy the agricultural industry, Steinbeck points out that the same argument was used against industrial labor organization, yet industry survived. However, he does not condone “vigilante terrorism” and encourages the federal government to pursue and prosecute vigilantes. He reviews the grievances of the migrants, ending with the statement, “They can be citizens of the highest type, or they can be an army driven by suffering and hatred to take what they need. On their future treatment will depend which course they will be forced to take.”

== Major themes ==
=== Labor and resistance ===
In addressing the labor market in California in the 1930s, Steinbeck describes a conflict between migrant laborers and commercial agriculture. He argues that California's agricultural sector is distinct from that of the Midwest because of its high level of commercialization and centralization. California's large farms are highly organized and controlled by banks, businessmen and wealthy politicians. Workers typically pay high rent to live in small, poorly maintained shacks on these farms. The managers of these ranches exercise a sort of extrajudicial power over their workers; deputized agents of the ranch enforce law on the property, sometimes shooting those workers found to be “resisting an officer.” Steinbeck suggests that the sheer numbers of migrants killed indicates the casualness with which these deputies operated.

Steinbeck notes that the harsh discipline on these large farms is intended to prevent any organization of labor, which the managers of the ranch fear. He observes that the “attitude of the employer on the ranch is one of hatred and suspicion, his method is the threat of his deputies' guns.” Any successful organization of labor would force the owners of large farms to provide better living and working conditions, which in turn would cut into profit margins.

Throughout his articles, Steinbeck takes a rather sympathetic position on the migrant laborers’ condition. His opinion is clearly informed by the squalor and poverty that characterizes the lives of many migrant workers. However, his views also seem to be guided by the central assumption that the shift in labor in the American West in the 1930s is not a temporary aberration but rather an irreversible paradigm shift. As a result, Steinbeck argues for their incorporation into the state of California. Their acceptance by the state and its existing inhabitants will benefit all parties. In conclusion, Steinbeck notes that the poor workers can be “citizens of the highest type, or they can be an army driven by suffering and hatred to take what they need.” In Steinbeck's opinion, a peaceful, constructive resolution to the conflict between laborer and employer is needed to forestall a more destructive resolution wrought by the laborers alone.

=== Health ===
Article II, in particular, details the dire consequences of poor sanitation of Hoovervilles, or "squatter camps" as Steinbeck refers to the shantytowns in the California valley. One of the three families he writes about had recently suffered the loss of one child; a four-year-old boy had been sick, poorly nourished and appeared feverish, then, "one night he went into convulsions and died."

Steinbeck also attacks the lack of basic preventative care among those in the "squatter camp" shantytowns. Part and parcel of his argument about the dignity of the laborers—and the way it is disregarded by local and national authorities—is his observation that, while "an epidemic" is a way of "getting [the attention]" of medical authorities, local doctors care little for malnutrition or dysentery. There is care for these easily treatable conditions, Steinbeck argues, but "these people do not know how to get the aid and they do not get it." What efforts there are to improve the lot of the workers are half-hearted, and there is no effort exhausted on outreach or civil society measures.

Describing another family, Steinbeck highlighted a three-year-old who had "a gunny sack tied about his middle for clothing. He has the swollen belly caused by malnutrition. [Fruit flies] try to get at the mucous in the eye-corners. This child seems to have the reactions of a baby much younger. The first year he had a little milk, but he has had none since. He will die in a very short time." This account of the child is grim but realistically so given the circumstances of living in Hoovervilles, suffering from poor hygiene and lack of food.

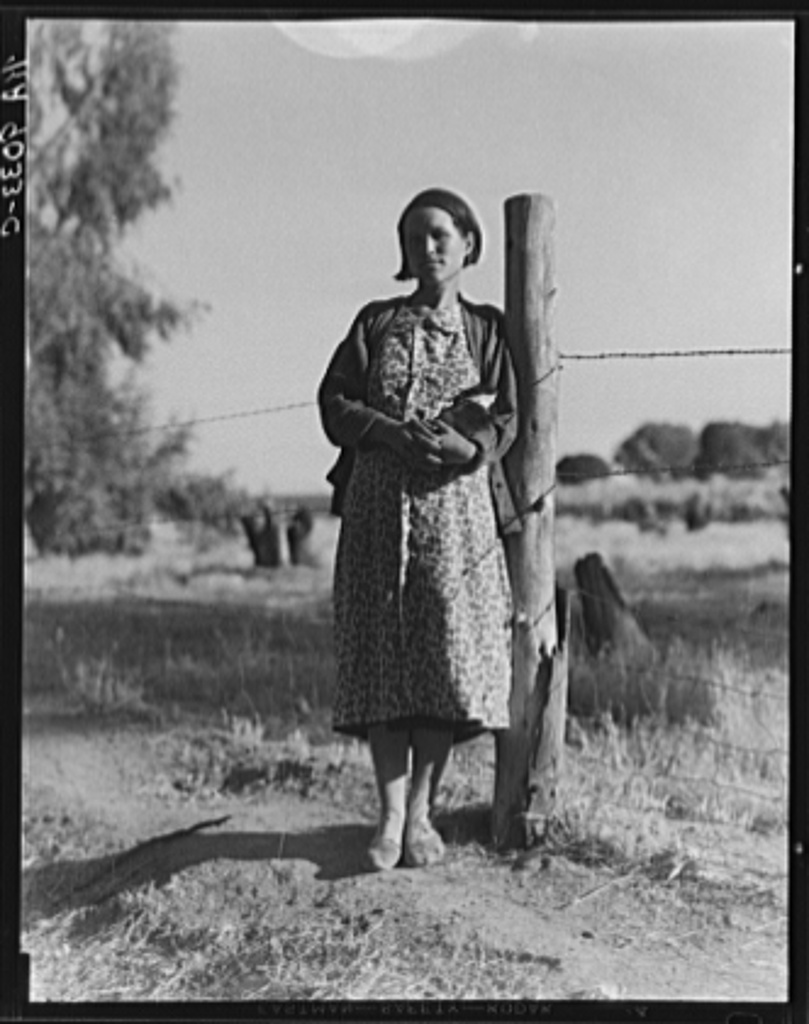
Pregnant migrant woman living in a squatter camp in Kern County, CA.: Dorothea Lange 1936

Pregnancy was extremely difficult as most mothers were malnourished. Steinbeck straightforwardly writes, "The problem of childbirth among the migrants is among the most terrible." While some women were able to conceive, most could not produce breastmilk, and as they continued to labor late in the pregnancy, miscarriages were increasingly common. In his discussion of challenges to normal pregnancy in Article V, he tells the poignant story of a woman who had multiple miscarriages, due to work accidents, sickness, and malnutrition. Steinbeck reports that she felt ashamed of not being able to conceive and bring healthy babies into the world, suggesting a way in which the Great Depression challenged femininity by compromising a female's ability to raise a healthy family.

=== Dignity ===
In detailing several of the narratives of migrant workers and their families, Steinbeck raises the concept of dignity, or pride, and how it wavered and diminished depending on what hardships were suffered and what level of poverty was reached. Article II showcases the stories of several families, and the mention of dignity and even spirit is present with every one. The first family is said to have put the children in school at every stop they made, even if for just a month at time, something that spoke to their pride. The father's attempt to craft a decent toilet by “digging a hole in the ground near his paper house and surrounding it with an old piece of burlap” is regarded by Steinbeck as a sign that “his spirit and decency and his sense of his own dignity have not been quite wiped out.”

As Steinbeck progresses down the classes of laborers and the state of their families, the dignity wanes as well. This is reflected in the unwillingness of the children to show their faces at school where they are ridiculed for their ragged clothing. It is also shown in the dullness that Steinbeck describes has settled over families who have lost young ones to malnutrition or other such diseases. Steinbeck describes this family to be in the middle class of the squatters’ camp. At the lower classes, Steinbeck declares, “Dignity is all gone, and spirit has turned to sullen anger before it dies.”

In Article IV, the surfacing of camps developed by the Resettlement Administration act not only as a provider of basic goods and living standards for the migrant workers and families, but also as a place for the migrants to regain their dignity as members of a functioning society. Because one of the three conditions of staying in the camp was to help to maintain the cleanliness of the camp, the migrant workers were given a responsibility that allowed them to contribute as members of a functioning community. Furthermore, the camp afforded them civilized amenities such as “water, toilet paper, and medical supplies,” which allowed for bathing and cleanliness of dress. Steinbeck states, “From the first, it was the intent of the management to restore the dignity and decency that had been kicked out of the migrants by their intolerant mode of life.” The Harvest Furthermore, within the camps many of the families took to growing their own vegetables, which Steinbeck saw as an uplifting sense of ownership to “have something of his own growing.”

=== Race among migrant laborers ===
Steinbeck's series of articles focuses primarily on American migrant laborers with Western and Northern European heritage who he describes as "resourceful and intelligent Americans...gypsies by force of circumstances." These are men and women, as he describes them, used to democracy, self-government, and self-reliance. He argues that their fate is a distinct misfortune, and the social abuse they suffer as migrant workers does not befit their history.

While the focus is on those white American migrants, Steinbeck also describes the lot of foreign migrants and notes how they are "ostracized and segregated and herded about." Article VI describes in the most detail their lives. The Chinese immigrants are notable for their low standard of living, and how their ability to live on very little led to their being driven from the fields by white laborers dissatisfied with the competition they created. He remarks upon their ability to accumulate property as notable given its contrast to the property-less white migrant. Steinbeck also mentions the presence of anti-Chinese immigration policy and its effect on keeping the numbers of Chinese working in the fields low. He then moves to a discussion of Japanese workers and the discrimination they faced with the rise of "yellow peril" literature. Also perceived as a threat to white labor, they too were eventually forced from the fields.

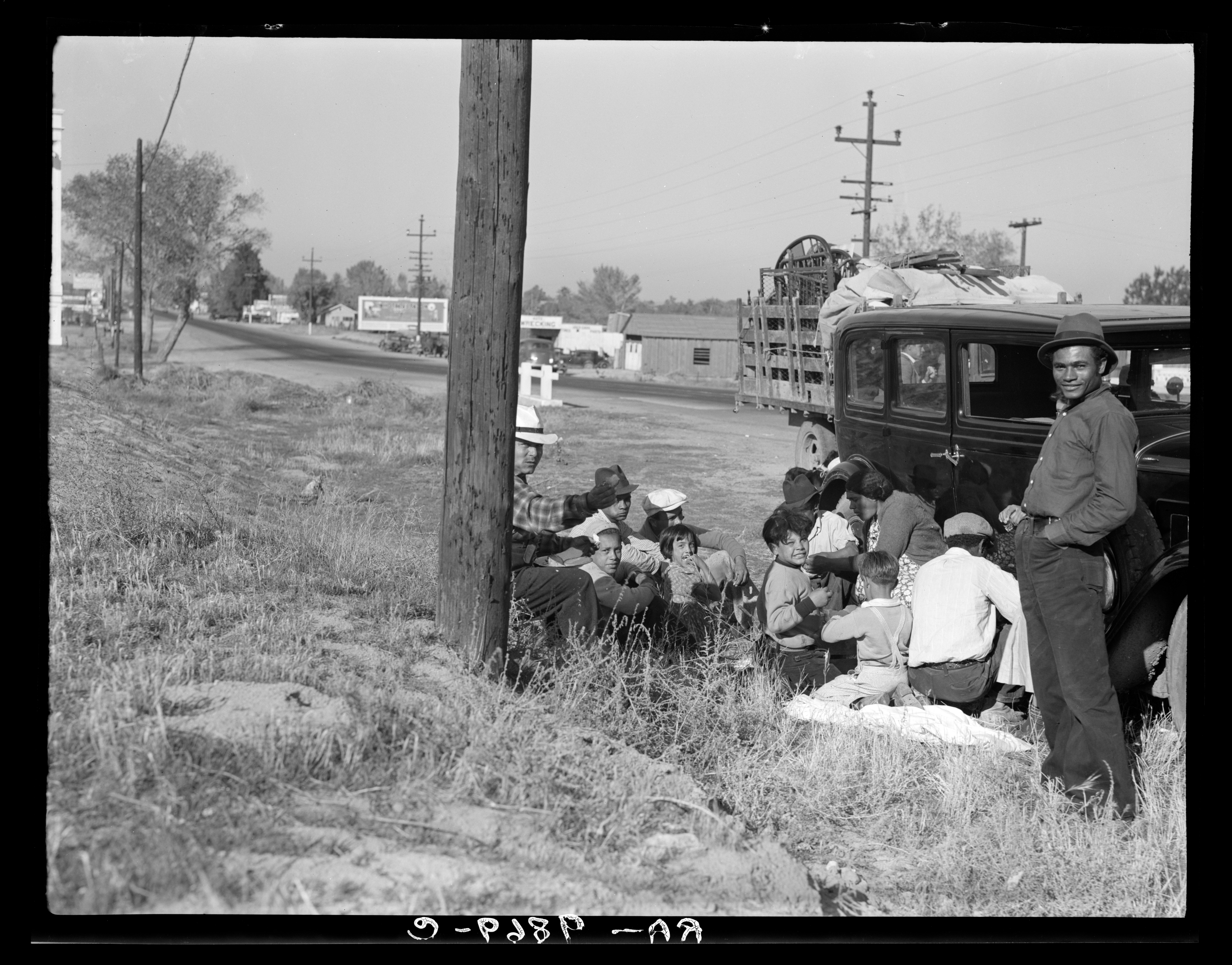
Mexicans bound for the Imperial Valley to harvest peas near Bakersfield, California: Dorothea Lange 1936

The non-American group that occupies the bulk of Steinbeck's section on foreign labor is the Mexicans. Steinbeck attributes their presence in California's fields to the "cry for peon labor" issued by farm owners seeking to maximize profits and minimize costs. Again, like with the Chinese, Steinbeck points out their standard of living and ability to subsist on depressed wages that made them preferable to white labor, particularly with the rise of intensive farming practices. Steinbeck comments on the treatment of the Mexican workers "as scrap," and the widespread abuses they suffered due to the impunity provided by Government's program to deport dissenting Mexicans. He also notes how Mexican workers, inspired by the example of workers in Mexico itself, began to organize themselves effectively, an impulse described as their "natural desire to organize" though their efforts were met with significant violence and lawlessness on both the citizens, growers, and officials of the Imperial Valley.

The final group Steinbeck describes are Filipino men, who he refers to as "little brown men." That they came without families made them attractive as a workforce, and they instead created male domestic units. Again, Steinbeck remarks on their ability to live on very little food and with few material goods. Racism against Filipino men arose less because of their role as a threat to white labor, but rather because of their extra-legal relations (caused by laws against inter-racial liaisons and marriages) with white women and the threat it posed to white masculinity. With the independence of the Philippines, the vast majority of the Filipino workers were subject to repatriation.

Steinbeck's discussion of the different racial groups involved in migrant agricultural labor spends most of its time noting the differences between the groups, though primarily concerns itself with distinguishing the foreigners from the white American farmers in terms of ability to subsist on poor wages and their ability to organize. He also consistently points out the violence levied at each foreign group, caused by the threat they posed to white labor and the system of industrial agriculture.

== Criticism and legacy ==
On October 20, 1936, several days after the initial release of the letters, Steinbeck published a letter in the San Francisco News responding to criticism from migrant workers over being referred to as "gypsies." "I have heard that a number of migrant workers have resented the title," Steinbeck wrote. "Certainly I had no intention of insulting a people who are already insulted beyond endurance." Within days, however, migrants' Camp Central Committee responded reassuringly in the same publication: "We think you did a fine job for us and we thank you. this is a big battle which cannot be won by ourselves, we need friends like you."

Steinbeck's series immediately became an important and influential work in the scholarly and popular investigation of California migrant labor. His articles built on and contributed to the works of economist Paul Taylor, photographer Dorothea Lange, and historian Carey McWilliams. McWilliams cited the series twice in the 1939 edition of his book Factories in the Field.

The pamphlet remained a valued item in publishing circles decades later. Helen Hosmer, the publisher, remembered seeing a copy sold in 1967 for $500.

Contemporary analysis of Steinbeck's text, while largely positive, has primarily criticized the articles' narrow scope and racist undertones. UC Berkeley history professor James Gregory, in a mixed review of a Heyday Books 1988 edition of the pamphlet, argues that Steinbeck's harsh treatment of agribusiness ignores the potential for exploitation in small family farms. He also argues that Steinbeck's choice to overlook the stories of more successful migrant workers created the potential for stereotyping. Despite his anguish over the incompleteness of Steinbeck's social history, Gregory goes on to call The Harvest Gypsies "a marvelous document of his time, important both to those interested in Steinbeck's personal development...and for anyone interested in the political passions surrounding Dust Bowl migration."

Historian Charles Wollenberg, in the introduction to the 1988 edition, attacks Steinbeck's assertion that unionization was inevitable because whites would "insist on a standard of living far higher than that which was accorded foreign 'cheap labor'" as ethnocentric and misguided. JMU English Professor Mollie Godfrey, in her article "They Ain't Human: John Steinbeck, Proletarian Fiction, and the Racial Politics of 'The People'," takes a slightly less critical stance, citing Steinbeck's claim that "racial discrimination" was one of the wealthy farmers' primary methods of maintaining power and arguing that Steinbeck's touting of white labor was largely "tactical." Godfrey acknowledges, however, that Steinbeck "attempts to combat economic exploitation of migrant workers by affirming their whiteness."

In 1999, New York University Communications Professor Mitchell Stephens directed a project to determine "The Top 100 Works of Journalism in the United States in the 20th Century." Steinbeck's accounts of migrant labor placed 31st on Mitchell's list, which was compiled by intellectuals including Morley Safer, George Will, and Pete Hamill. In 2002, Heyday Books released an updated version of its 1988 printing.

== Aftermath and effect on policy ==
In his introduction to the 1988 edition, Wollenberg concludes:

Even the popularity of The Grapes of Wrath, however, did not produce significant public programs to assist the migrants. Foreign affairs and the coming U.S. involvement in World War II increasingly captured the nation's attention. By the end of 1940, reporter Ernie Pyle noted that the Okies no longer made headlines: "people sort of forgot them". A year later, the labor surplus of the Depression had been transformed into an extraordinary wartime shortage of workers. Migrants who were not subject to military service found well-paying jobs in California's booming shipyards, aircraft factories and other defense plants. The Joads and their fellow Okies ultimately found economic salvation, not in the small farms they dreamed of owning, but in urban industry fueled by billions of federal dollars.

California growers, desperate for labor, once again turned to Mexico. Hundreds of thousands of new workers crossed the border, many of them arriving under the terms of the U.S. government's Bracero program. With the farm labor force no longer dominated by white Americans, little attention or sympathy was focused on social conditions in rural California. Not until the Delano strike of 1965, in an era sensitized by the Civil Rights Movement, did issues raised in The Grapes of Wrath return to the broad public consciousness. And not until 1975 did the state legislature establish an Agricultural Labor Relations Board similar to the one Steinbeck advocated in 1936.

— Charles Wollenberg.
