= Edward W. Carter =

American businessman (1911–1996)

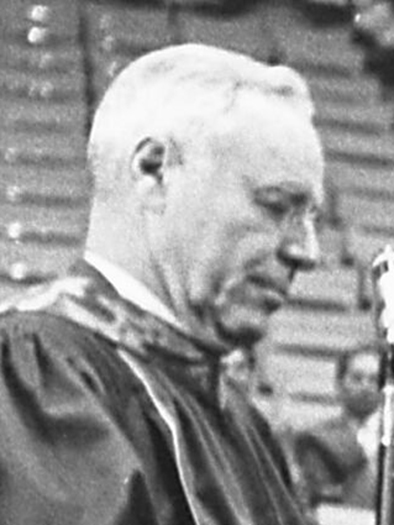
- Carter in 1966
- Born: June 29, 1911; Cumberland, Maryland, United States
- Died: April 25, 1996 (aged 84); Bel Air, Los Angeles, California, United States
- Education: University of California, Los Angeles
- Occupations: Businessman, philanthropist, art collector
- Title: President of Broadway Stores; Chair of the University of California Board of Regents; Owner of the Hannah Carter Japanese Garden

Edward W. Carter (June 29, 1911 – April 25, 1996) was an American businessman, philanthropist and art collector. He served as the president of Broadway Stores and chair of the University of California Board of Regents, and was the owner of the Hannah Carter Japanese Garden.

== Early life ==
Carter was born on June 29, 1911, in Cumberland, Maryland. His father died when he was nine years old, and he moved to Los Angeles, California shortly after with his mother, Rose Price Carter, and sister, Ruth. He attended Hollywood High School, and worked through his school and college. He graduated from the University of California, Los Angeles (UCLA) and received a Master's in Business Administration from the Harvard Business School. He was offered a teaching position at Harvard, but turned it down to focus on his business career.

== Career ==
In 1945, Carter served as an executive of Broadway Stores, later endowed with 150 stores and sales of $7.5 billion a year. After the Second World War, he opened new stores on American freeways. In 1946, his Crenshaw Center on the outskirts of Los Angeles was one of the first shopping centers in the United States. He sold some stocks to Hale Brothers & Co. and by 1950 the two companies merged. Their stores included The Emporium, Neiman Marcus, Waldenbooks and Bergdorf Goodman. He served on the boards of directors of the Los Angeles Area Chamber of Commerce, the California Retailers Association, the Los Angeles branch of the Federal Reserve Bank of San Francisco, the Northrop Aircraft Corp. and the California Bank.

== Philanthropy ==
Carter was one of the co-founders of the Los Angeles County Museum of Art (LACMA) and the Los Angeles Music Center. A world-renowned collector of Dutch Golden Age paintings, he donated 50 of them to the LACMA. He also donated the Hannah Carter Japanese Garden to his alma mater, UCLA. He supported the Los Angeles Philharmonic and the San Francisco Opera.

He served on the regents of the University of California from 1952 to 1988, and of Occidental College.

== Personal life ==
Carter resided in Bel Air, Los Angeles. He was married twice. His first wife, Christine Dailey Carter, died during his lifetime. They had a son, William Carter, and a daughter, Ann Carter Huneke. He remarried to Hannah Carter, who competed on the United States Ski Team in the 1936 Summer Olympics.

== Death ==
Carter died of pancreatic cancer at his home in Bel Air on April 25, 1996. His memorial service was at the St. Alban's Episcopal Church in Westwood, Los Angeles.
