= Hale Bros. =

Hale Brothers
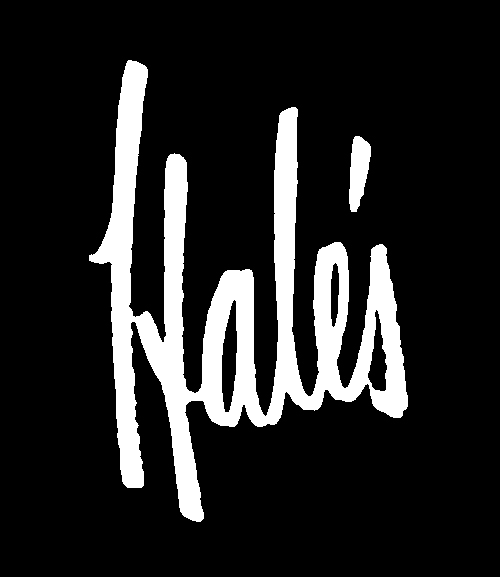

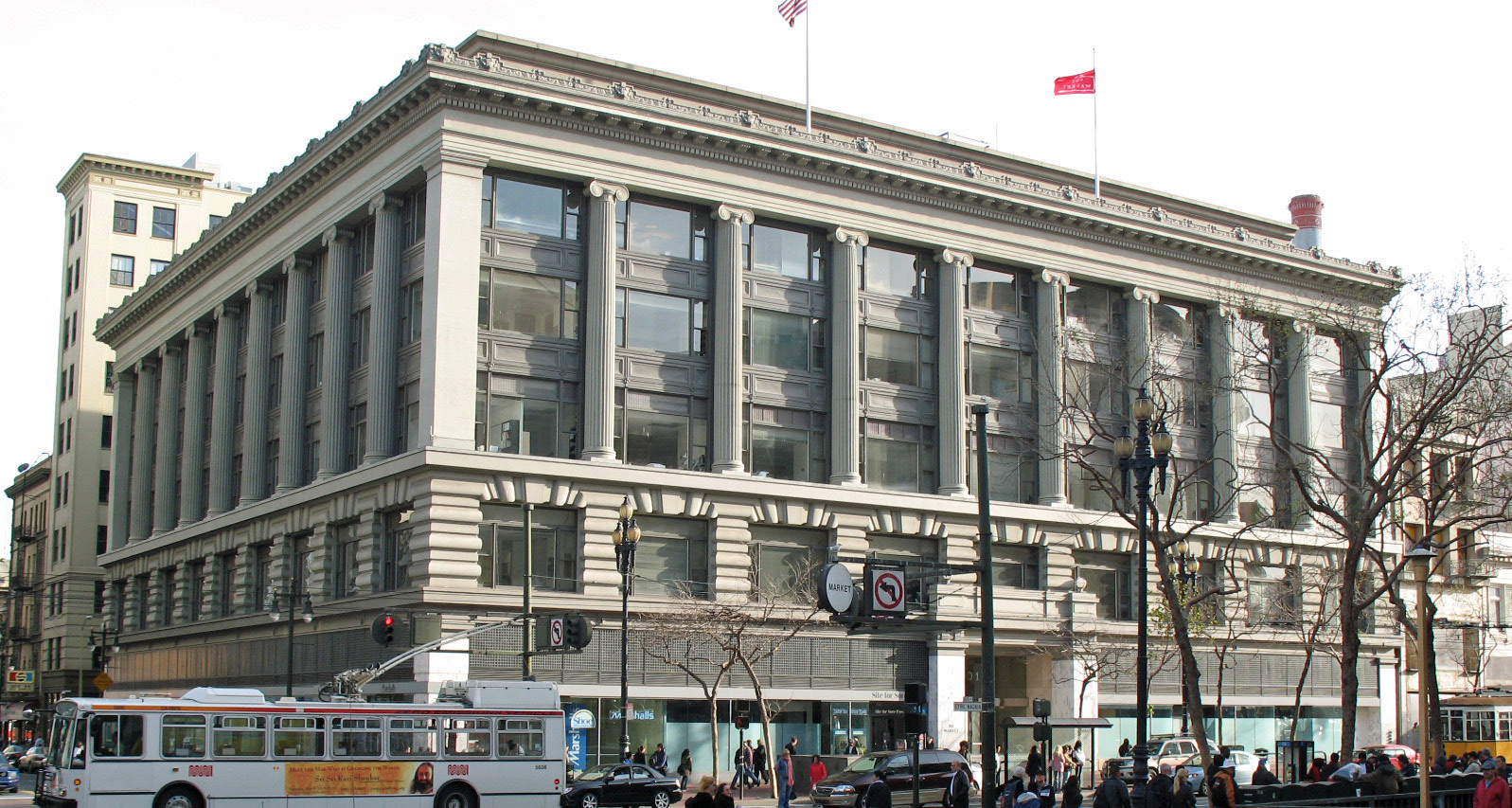
- Former Hale's Store at 979–989 Market Street, San Francisco (5th St. and Market St.)
- Company type: Subsidiary
- Industry: Retail
- Founded: 1876; 150 years ago
- Founder: Marshal Hale Sr.
- Defunct: January 5, 1968; 58 years ago
- Fate: Converted into Weinstock's and The Broadway
- Successor: Weinstock's; The Broadway
- Headquarters: Sacramento, California, United States
- Key people: Prentis Cobb Hale, Oliver Ambrose Hale, Evert W. Hale, James M. Hale, Marshal Hale
- Parent: Broadway-Hale Stores (1950-1968)
- Website: None

Hale Brothers Department Store (Hale Bros., Hales's, or Hale Brothers and Company), was a department store headquartered in Sacramento, California, with branches throughout the San Francisco Bay Area.

One of the former store locations at 979–989 Market Street in the Market Street Theatre and Loft District (Mid-Market) of San Francisco is listed as a U.S. National Register of Historic Place.

== History ==
Marshal Hale Sr. (b. Vermont, 1809) had been a merchant first in New York State, growing his business to a five store chain, and later in Michigan. In November 1873, Hale Sr. came to San Jose, California, with his wife and six of his nine children and in 1876 founded a 3,600-square-foot store there together with his sons Oliver Ambrose Hale and Evert W. Hale as well as with J. Frank Devendort, each of the men with a 25% stake. Hale persuaded another son, James M. Hale, to come to California and in 1878 they opened a store in Salinas.

By 1879 brother Prentis Cobb Hale was president of Hale Bros.' Stores, Inc., and he joined with his father as partner in 1879.

In 1880 Prentis and two of his brothers opened the Criterion store in Downtown Sacramento, brother Evert taking charge of the store, and in 1881 they named it Hale Brothers & Company. The company opened large branches in San Francisco (1892) and San Jose (1896), Salinas, Stockton and Petaluma, and via an acquisition of Whitthorne & Swann in 1906, Oakland.

Brother Marshal Hale became a partner in 1886 and R. B. did so in 1889.

1925 sales across five stores (Downtown San Francisco, Mission District, Oakland, San Jose and Sacramento) totales $17,214,124. At that time Hale's owned and operated a radio station, KPO, "the Voice of San Francisco", and was one of the first U.S. department stores to do so.

In 1949, Hale's bought their Sacramento rival, Weinstock, Lubin & Co. In the same year, Hale's merged with Los Angeles–based Broadway Department Stores, becoming Broadway-Hale Stores, Carter Hawley Hale Stores, and later Broadway-Hale Stores.

Hale Bros. had 30% ownership of J. M. Hale Co., also known as Hales, in Los Angeles, founded by one of the Hale Brothers, James M. Hale (1846-1946).

== Store locations ==
=== Sacramento ===
Hale's first opened in Sacramento in 1880, and was last located at 825-831 K Street.

=== San Francisco ===
- In 1892 opened their first San Francisco store on Market Street opposite Mason Street
- In the 1890s moved to larger quarters at 989 Market Street near Sixth. The store was dynamited to try to prevent the spread of the fire following the 1906 San Francisco Earthquake, was rebuilt and reopened in 1907.
- On October 31, 1912, opened a grand new store at 901 Market Street, southwest corner of Fifth Street. The store was designed by Reid & Reid, with five stories plus a basement roughly 175x170 feet square, for a total of approximately 178,000 sq ft. Hale's added infantwear, book and flower departments. After Hale's moved east to 867 and 753 Market in the mid-1940s, J.C. Penney operated here from 1944 until February 1971 and was renovated after that in 1985. Until 2023 home to a Saks Off Fifth and a Nordstrom Rack, which both closed.
- moved again to 867 Market Street, current site of San Francisco Centre. Hale’s closed the store as well as three smaller appliance stores along Market and Mission streets, on January 5, 1963.

Hale Bros. operated a store in the Mission District at 2554 Mission near 21st Street, a branch of Oakland-based Whitthorn & Swan opened in 1925, which Hale's wholly acquired in 1926. It continued to operate as Hale’s sole San Francisco store until the mid-1960s even after the main Market Street store closed in 1963.

In 1946, Hale's opened a Women's Clothing store designed by architect William Gladstone Merchant (1889-1962) on Geary Street at the corner of Maiden Lane. Six years later in 1952, Saks Fifth Avenue acquired the location for its first San Francisco location, which opened February 5, 1952.

=== Oakland ===
Hale's operated an Oakland store at 1015 Washington at 11th, first acquiring and converting the Salinger department store to a Hale's. In 1906 Hale's purchased a stake in the Whitthorne & Swan department store at 1015 (10th–11th &) Washington, and in 1926 acquired it outright, expanding it to 124,800 sq ft and operating it under that name until Mr. Whitthorne died in 1940.

=== San Jose ===
Hale Bros. opened its first store in San Jose around 1876 and for much of the early 20th century operated a large department store at the corner of 1st and San Carlos.
