= David Lubin =

Polish-born American agriculturalist, merchant and activist

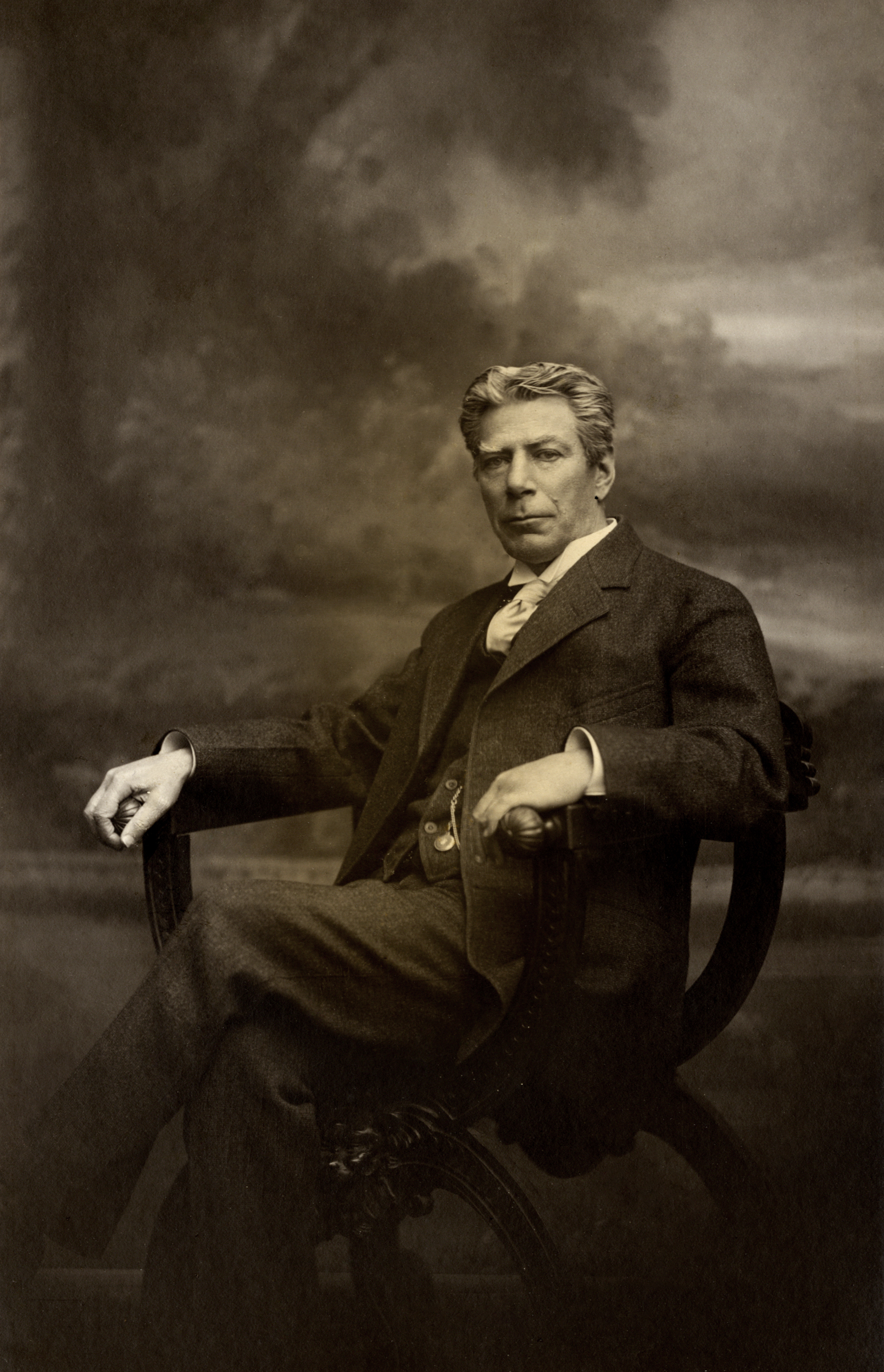
- Lubin, in Rome
- Born: 10 June 1849; Kłodawa, Poland
- Died: 1 January 1919 (aged 69); Rome, Italy
- Occupation: Businessman
- Children: Simon J. Lubin, Simon had 4 siblings and 3 half siblings: Dorothy Sophie Lubin Heller, Grace Lubin Finesinger, Theodore Lubin
- Relatives: Harris Weinstock (half-brother)

David Lubin (10 June 1849 – 1 January 1919) was a merchant and agriculturalist. He was pivotal in founding the International Institute of Agriculture in 1908, in Rome.

== Biography ==
He was born in Kłodawa, Poland. His family moved to England in 1853. On his father's death, David's mother married again and they emigrated to America. He received a scant education and at an early age was placed in a jewelry factory in Attleboro, Massachusetts. Finding slight opportunity of advancement there he drifted to California. He reached Sacramento, and after working at odd jobs he amassed sufficient funds to start a dry goods store of his own. He dealt largely in overalls and thus came in contact with the farmers of California, and as he met them in person he learned something of their problems. He started a prosperous mail order business with his half-brother Harris Weinstock and his sister Jeanette Levy. Lubin's One Price Store later became known as Weinstock, Lubin & Co..

While in Sacramento, he bought a fruit ranch near Sacramento and land for raising wheat. His knowledge of agriculture assisted him when he helped found the California Fruit Growers' Union. He then helped settle Eastern European Jewish refugees who worked on various farms in the area and, in 1891, he became the director of the International Society for the Colonization of Russian Jews. He then began to campaign for subsidies and protection for farmers, initially in California but eventually on an international scale.

In his new vocation of farmer, there came to him the idea of an international agricultural congress, whereby one side of the globe might learn what the other side was producing and how and at what cost. He began collecting statistics on the subject, studied plant life and domestic animals and made investigations into their diseases and sought remedies. His son, Simon, helped him develop a proposal for an international chamber of agriculture. In 1896, David Lubin moved to Europe to implement the proposal. Around the same time, Weinstock, Lubin & Co. became known as Weinstock's, a department store chain which ceased operations in 1995.

In Italy, in 1904, King Victor Emmanuel III saw the need for such an institution and gave it his ardent support, giving a building for the congress and an annual income of $60,000. In May 1905, the International Institute of Agriculture (the IIA) opened in Rome. The Institute's goals were to help farmers share knowledge, produce systematically, establish a cooperative system of rural credit, and have control over the marketing of their products. At the first gathering 40 nations were represented. In 1906, Lubin was appointed the permanent U.S. delegate to the IIA. In 1913 on the occasion of the meeting of the congress in Rome Mr. Lubin received a silver cup as a token of appreciation of his efforts in originating the organization. By 1919, 53 nations were represented at the IIA gatherings.

The IIA ceased operations in 1945. Several of its assets were transferred to the United Nations' Food and Agriculture Organization (FAO). The mandate of international cooperation in the field of agriculture is continued by the FAO, which named its library in honor of David Lubin. The David Lubin Memorial Library (DLML) maintains the personal archives of David Lubin and the collection of the IIA library. It accepts visitors who would like to research these materials in person.

The U.S. Federal Farm Act (1916), whose founding ideas and policies can be seen to be influenced by Lubin and the International Institute of Agriculture, introduced rural credit and contributed to the relief of American farmers during the Great Depression. Similarly, Lubin's successful fight for the lowering of oppressive freight rates also helped lead to the development of the parcel post system. He also took a keen interest in farmers' co-operative societies and granges and was interested in oceanic shipping. He introduced a national marketing proposal on the lines of the German Landwirtschaftsrat.

In addition, Lubin wrote essays and treatises. His novel, Let There be Light, proposed a universal world religion. He died in the 1918 flu pandemic, aged 69 on January 1, 1919.

== Legacy ==
The centenary of IIA was celebrated by ISTAT (Italian Statistics Office) and FAO and its Statistics Division on 28 May 2008 in Rome.

The Western Jewish History Center, of the Judah L. Magnes Museum, in Berkeley, California has a large collection of papers, correspondence, publications, and photographs of David Lubin.

David Lubin Elementary School is located in the East Sacramento neighborhood of Sacramento, CA, a few blocks from the site of David Lubin's former home.
