= Weinstock's =

American department store chain

Coordinates: 38.581152°N 121.501644°W

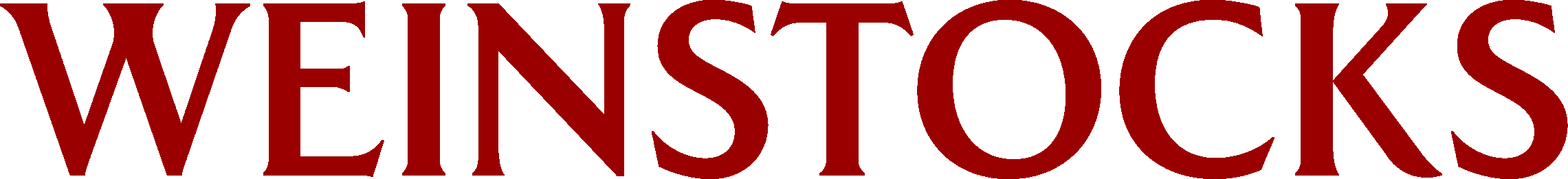
Weinstock's final logo

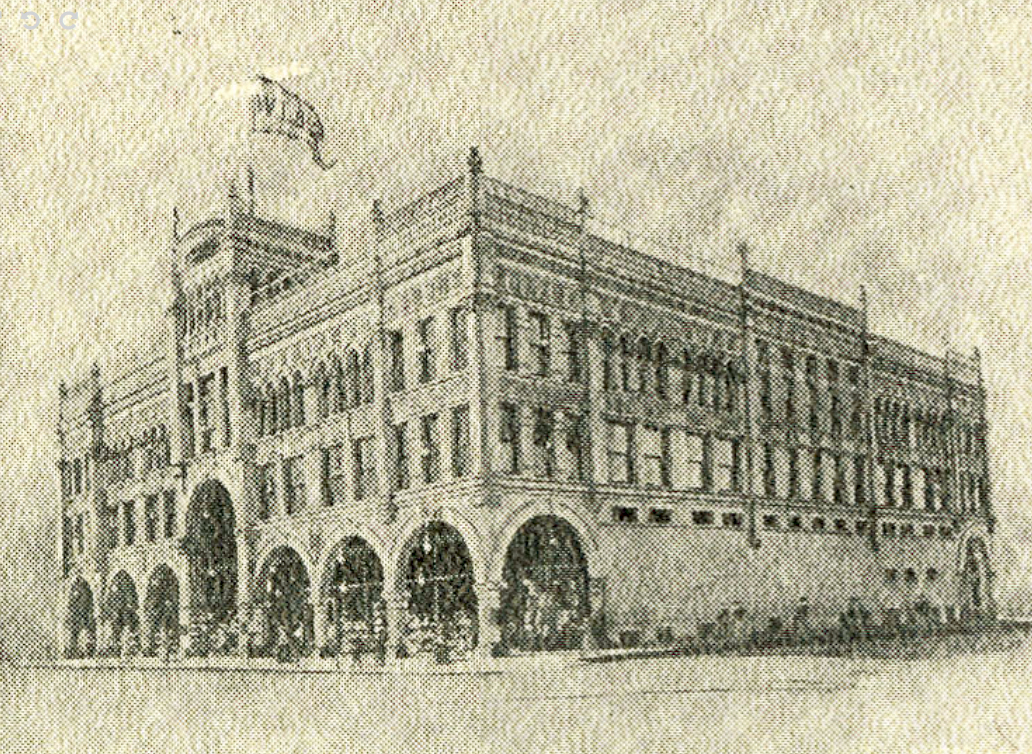
Photograph of the original store destroyed in 1903

Weinstock's, originally Weinstock, Lubin, and Co., was an American department store chain headquartered in Sacramento, California. It was founded by Harris Weinstock and his half-brother, David Lubin.

The first location opened in 1874 on the corner of Fourth and K Streets. One of the most famous Weinstock's locations, in Sacramento, opened on November 24, 1891.

The chain was purchased by Hale's in 1949, becoming part of Broadway-Hale Stores, later Carter Hawley Hale. In 1978, Weinstock's expanded into Utah by rebranding its sister chain The Broadway's location at Fashion Place in Murray into that name, with two stores later in Ogden and Salt Lake City. In 1991, Weinstock's operations were later assumed by its other sister chain The Emporium. In 1993, Weinstock's closed its three Utah stores, eventually bringing Dillard's to Utah for the first time with its first store in Murray's former location. The chain was later purchased by Federated Department Stores (now Macy's, Inc.) in 1995, resulting in most of the Weinstock's stores to be converted to Macy's. Some of the remaining stores were either closed or sold, with two of them to Gottschalks, at Vintage Faire Mall in Modesto and Fashion Fair in Fresno. This also brought Dillard's to California for the first time with its new store built on the former Weinstock's site at Weberstown Mall in Stockton.

== See also ==
- List of department stores converted to Macy's
- List of defunct department stores of the United States
